= List of Hero episodes =

Mediacorp Channel 8's television series Hero is a family-drama series produced by Mediacorp Studios in 2016, starring Shaun Chen, Jesseca Liu and Chen Hanwei.

The show aired on Mediacorp Channel 8 from 29 November 2016 with 30 episodes.

== Episodes ==
No.	Title	Original release date
1	"Episode 1"	29 November 2016; PG Some Sexual References
Zhou Fada (Shaun Chen), nicknamed Big Brother, lives in the Dakota Crescent neighbourhood, where Ye Xiaoying (Chen Hanwei) and Zhang Weixiong (Jesseca Liu) also live. Big Brother is a young loafer with erratic behaviour. Though Xiaoying is Big Brother’s uncle and his senior, they bicker constantly. Weixiong is a beautiful female law student and has known Big Brother since young. The three are self-proclaimed “heroes” of Dakota Crescent. Big Brother’s grandmother, nicknamed Grandma Wuxia (Jin Yinji), is helpful with a sense of righteousness. She even takes care of her neighbour, Cardboard Auntie (Ng Suan Loi), when she is ill. In the hope of getting her to buy them a meal, Big Brother and Xiaoying flatter Grandma Wuxia shamelessly. She laments that both of them are lazy and good-for-nothing. None of Big Brother’s jobs last, and all of Xiaoying’s business ventures have failed. In exasperation, she gives them $2 to buy food for the three of them. Big Brother manages to get them a decent meal with just $2. Also living in the neighbourhood are Guan Meiyu (He Yingying) and Guan Meimei (Bonnie Loo), a pair of twins. Meiyu is smart, while Meimei is not as able. Meiyu orders Meimei to sing at hawker centres to earn a living. She gives her a bottle of pepper to defend herself. Luo Bei (Peter Yu) is moved by Meimei’s voice. He gives her a $50 tip. Stunned, Meimei does not dare accept it. Big Brother urges her to keep it.
2	"Episode 2"	30 November 2016; PG Some Sexual References
Big Brother learns Meimei has dropped out of school and assumes she is going to be a busker. She explains she has hopes of becoming a professional singer and is gathering the courage to try it out. Xiaoying comes up with another business idea and asks Big Brother to convince his good friend, Ou Jinguang (Andie Chen), to invest in it. Big Brother refuses. Jinguang and his father, Ou Sihai (Zhu Houren), own a small provision shop. Jinguang is honest and introverted, and does not have a mind of his own. On the pretext of making Jinguang an investor in his new business, Xiaoying tricks him into handing over his ATM card. Xiaoying likes Jinguang’s sister, Jinxuan (Paige Chua). He plans to buy her a sumptuous meal when he gets the money. Weixiong’s brother, Weikang (Ian Fang), tells Meiyu that Meimei has left with a stranger. Meiyu looks frantically for Meimei and finds her just in time to rescue her from the wiles of a fake policeman. Fan Fangfang (Sheila Sim) goes to Si Hai provision shop looking for Chen Bangqing (James Seah). An overseas visitor, she only knows he lives along Dakota Crescent. She does not have the exact address, so Jinguang is unable to help her. Weixiong’s mother, Jiahui (Pan Lingling), tolerates her mother-in-law, nicknamed Mahjong Auntie (Zhu Xiufeng), who always picks on her. Big Brother and Weixiong suspect Luo Bei has stolen Cardboard Auntie’s money. They drag him to face her. Cardboard Auntie denies knowing him and asserts that he did not steal her money. They recognise Luo Bei as a once-popular actor and are sobered that in retirement he is merely down and out. Weixiong forces Big Brother to take out his educational certificates and start applying for jobs. He lies that he flunked his “A” Level exams even though he passed with flying colours.
3	"Episode 3"	1 December 2016; PG Some Disturbing Scenes
Weixiong talks Big Brother into working a temporary job with a moving company. He agrees reluctantly. To avoid the strenuous work, he fakes an injury. Meiyu and Meimei’s father, Guan A-li (Chen Tianwen), is released from prison. Even though he and his wife, Lili (Aileen Tan), are divorced, he keeps harassing her. He has the impression that she divorced him while he was serving his prison sentence because she had a lover. Jiahui’s back is injured when she piggybacks Mahjong Auntie up the stairs. The latter has been complaining about her own backache. Jiahui’s secondary school classmate, Xie Xian (Terence Cao), insists on taking her home in his car when he notices that she is in pain. A cleaner finds Fangfang lying motionless in a playground and asks Jinguang to check if she is still alive. Fangfang wakes up suddenly. Thinking Jinguang is up to no good, she slaps him. Xiaoying gives Jinxuan a string of cheap religious beads and brags that it can change a person’s destiny and fulfil the wishes of its owner. Jinxuan listens in disbelief. A-li buys a can of kerosene and a lighter from Si Hai provision shop. Believing he is going to set fire to Lili’s house, Big Brother warns her. He diverts A-li’s attention to give Lili time to escape.
4	"Episode 4"	2 December 2016; PG Some Disturbing Scenes
Weixiong is concerned about Big Brother’s so-called injury. Sensing something fishy from Meimei's reaction, she realises Big Brother is only feigning pain. Meimei wants to talk A-li out of causing harm to her family. Big Brother does not stop her but Xiaoying worries A-li might turn violent. Big Brother is confident A-li will not hurt his own daughter. A-li claims he has never had any intention of setting Meimei’s house afire. He had only made the threat in a fit of anger. Weixiong starts scolding A-li. Infuriated, he splashes kerosene on her. Big Brother quickly turns A-li's attention away. The police arrive and A-li flees. Although Lili is angry with A-li, she does not wish for him to be imprisoned yet again. One of Mahjong Auntie's mahjong players, Steven (Henry Thia), tries to get fresh with Jiahui. Jiahui wants her husband, Zhiming (Brandon Wong), to tell Mahjong Auntie not to allow strangers into their house to play mahjong. Zhiming remains indifferent. Big Brother points out that being impulsive is Weixiong's weakness. She agrees, and laments that she is not suited to being a lawyer. Jinguang finds the homeless Fangfang in the void deck, running a fever. He takes her back to the provision shop. It's late at night. Big Brother is glued to his computer, analysing the US stock market. He has a target in mind.
5	"Episode 5"	5 December 2016; PG Some Violence
Xiaoying wakes up in the middle of the night. To his horror, he finds his front door on fire. He dashes into the room to wake Grandma Wuxia up. Meanwhile, Big Brother manages to put out the fire. Xiaoying tries to convince Grandma Wuxia that A-li is to blame, but she discerns that it is he who has loanshark debts. They had set the fire as a warning. Mahjong Auntie keeps complaining to Zhiming about Jiahui but he ignores her. Weixiong scolds Weikang for insisting on going to a private university despite their family’s tight budget. Lili hears a commotion coming from Cardboard Auntie’s house. She sees Luo Bei taking Cardboard Auntie’s money and yells at him. Jinguang allows Fangfang to stay in the provision shop’s storeroom. Big Brother reminds him that he could be jailed for harbouring an illegal immigrant. Weixiong has a crush on her classmate, Jack (Teddy Tang). She buys his favourite food to get closer to him. Grandma Wuxia wants to withdraw the $20,000 from her joint fixed deposit with Big Brother, to help Xiaoying pay off the loansharks. Big Brother objects.
6	"Episode 6"	6 December 2016; PG Some Sexual References
Unbeknownst to anyone else, Big Brother has already withdrawn the money from the fixed deposit account. He disapproves of Grandma Wuxia helping Xiaoying, whom he feels will not learn a lesson and will continue to borrow money from her. Xiaoying tries to sell off all his religious beads by exaggerating their powers. Jinxuan asks Xiaoying to help her attract the attention of a wealthy man by putting up an act with her. She does not want to live an ordinary life, and has decided she can only use deceitful means to break free from her mediocre background. Luo Bei watches an old drama in which he had a role, on television. Comparing how attractive he was then to his current plight, he becomes depressed. He craves drugs and becomes suicidal. Lili and Meimei see Luo Bei trying to jump off an overhead bridge and stop him. Lili gives him a severe reprimand. Lili disapproves of Meimei busking at hawker centres. She accuses Meiyu of getting Meimei earn money for her to buy a new handphone, and their relationship sours. Weixiong’s undergarments are stolen. Big Brother manages to catch the culprit. Weixiong overhears Big Brother talking to Jinguang on the phone about a secret operation at night. She suspects they are up to something illegal.
7	"Episode 7"	7 December 2016; PG Some Sexual References
Big Brother finds out about a secret beach party. He takes Jinguang and Xiaoying there to sell beer and soft drinks. Weixiong is there at the secret beach party with Jack. She tries to evade Big Brother but to no avail. The three friends made a profit at the secret beach party. Xiaoying suggests they invest the money in a business, and Big Brother refuses to agree. Lili is incensed with Meimei for letting A-li into the house. He assures her that he is turning over a new leaf, but Lili does not believe him. Meiyu is slapped by A-li for criticising him. Weikang consoles her and suggests she enrol in a private university and befriend rich people. She dares him to get a sugar mummy and says she will follow suit. He accepts the challenge. Fangfang has found Bangqing, but they are unable to find a place to stay. Grandma Wuxia rents them a room. They get along so well that Grandma Wuxia accepts Fangfang as her god-granddaughter. A wealthy middle-aged woman (Xiang Yun) asks to meet Big Brother before she undergoes major surgery.
8	"Episode 8"	8 December 2016; PG Some Drug References
Thinking Big Brother is the one who “cheated” Grandma Wuxia of her life’s savings, Fangfang starts hitting him. Later, she finds out he and Grandma Wuxia are very close and bickering is their form of interaction. Bangqing finds them strange and suggests moving out, but Fangfang insists on staying. Luo Bei experiences cravings for drugs again. When he hits his head against a wall, Weixiong tries to call the ambulance but Cardboard Auntie intervenes. Big Brother is certain Luo Bei does not want his drug addiction to be leaked to the media. Big Brother goes after Mahjong Auntie for some $10 worth of mahjong debts. Weixiong pays him and chides him for being good-for-nothing. Big Brother warns Weixiong that Jack is ill-intentioned and had bought a condom at the secret beach party. She disregards his word of caution and goes on a date with Jack. She gets drunk and is taken to a hotel. Grandma Wuxia tells Big Brother his mother has asked to meet him. Xiaoying rebukes Big Brother’s mother for betraying her husband and abandoning her son. Wang (Mervyn Lee) approaches Xiaoying and claims the religious beads had helped him win a lot of money through gambling. Xiaoying jacks up the price, and Wang agrees to buy all his religious beads for $160,000.
9	"Episode 9"	9 December 2016; PG Some Sexual References
Xiaoying shows off by buying designer items for Jinxuan. When George (Zhang Zhenhuan) calls her, however, she casts Xiaoying aside and goes off with the rich man. Sihai wants Jinxuan to pay his hospital bills, as well as foot the family’s expenses. Annoyed, Jinxuan prepares to move out. Bangqing learns Xiaoying has earned a fortune from his business and suggests a collaboration. He also helps Fangfang get a job at his new company. Meimei is commended for her work as a cleaner. When she is cleaning a male toilet, an employee named Walter (Desmond Ng) vents his anger by kicking the trash bin. She advises him to endure his frustrations. Meiyu receives more than 10 responses to her Internet search for a sugar daddy but feels uncomfortable about replying. However, after being put down by Lili, she decides to spite her by getting a sugar daddy. Jack tells Weixiong he took some compromising photos of her when she was drunk. He demands she do his bidding. Steven spreads rumours that he and Jiahui are having an affair. He threatens to embarrass her further unless she agrees to go to a hotel with him. She is stumped.
10	"Episode 10"	12 December 2016 PG
Big Brother arrives in time to help Jiahui teach Steven a lesson. He orders Steven to leave the neighbourhood at once. Jiahui hopes Big Brother will have a heart-to-heart talk with Weixiong, who seems to be troubled. Cardboard Auntie faints on the street. Big Brother carries her to the doctor, despite her protests. She is diagnosed to have arthritis and anaemia. Big Brother provokes Weixiong deliberately, and she blurts out that she is being blackmailed by Jack. When she breaks down, Big Brother asserts that it is just a small issue but does not reveal the way to tackle it. Lili tries to convince Luo Bei to quit drugs. She encourages him to pull himself together. Wang blames Xiaoying for selling him the religious beads, which are the reason he has lost money gambling. Big Brother wants Xiaoying to return the remaining money to Wang. Jinxuan’s rich boyfriend, George, arranges for her to move into an Orchard Road apartment. He goes missing, and she is required to pay the rent. Xiaoying cheers Jinxuan up by splurging on a $60,000 diamond ring on her.
11	"Episode 11"	13 December 2016; PG Some Sexual References
Meiyu meets her sugar daddy, Eric (Marcus Mok), a middle-aged accountant. He agrees to give her a $4,000 study allowance every month, just for having heart-to-heart talks. Weikang suspects he is a cheat, as the deal is too good to be true. However, she has already accepted the money. Luo Bei wills himself to fight his drug addiction, and does not pawn the remaining jewellery from Cardboard Auntie to buy drugs. Big Brother tricks Jack and gets hold of his handphone. Weixiong looks through the handphone and finds videos of other female victims. Big Brother suggests making a police report. Fangfang does as Bangqing says and signs the document he gives her. Big Brother declares she is too gullible, and she replies that she has known Bangqing since she was 16 and there is no reason not to trust him. Walter asks Meimei why she is a cleaner, since she likes singing so much. She claims she does not dare to dream of a singing career. In turn, she advises him not to hide in the toilet when he is supposed to be at a meeting. Luo Bei and Big Brother see a woman attempting to jump off a block of flats and rush over to save her.
12	"Episode 12"	14 December 2016; PG Some Disturbing Scenes
Wang’s wife, A-jiao (Joy Yak), is depressed that Wang has gambled all their hard-earned money away. They even owe loansharks money. A-jiao disregards Luo Bei and attempts to jump to her death. Out of desperation, Big Brother tricks A-jiao into abandoning her suicide attempt. Jinguang cannot bear the closure of a porridge stall he has frequented since childhood. The stall owner, Teochew Auntie, suggests he take over the business. She is willing to teach him how to cook porridge. Business at the provision shop is failing. Encouraged by Fangfang, Jinguang decides to try to revive it. Mahjong Auntie wants Jiahui to accompany her to Chinatown. Jiahui hesitates, as she has not been there in a long time. Chinatown is so different from what she remembers that Mahjong Auntie becomes disheartened. Jiahui wants to cheer her up by buying her clothes. However, she is unable to withdraw money from the ATM because she has forgotten her PIN.
13	"Episode 13"	15 December 2016; PG Some Sexual References
Mahjong Auntie is upset when Jiahui does not buy the new clothes for her after all. Jiahui reproaches herself for being forgetful and worries that she is developing dementia, like her mother. While washing the toilet, Meimei remembers Walter’s complaints and stops singing. He is amused that she is taking his joke seriously. After work, Walter insists on taking Meimei to a karaoke lounge. It is her first experience, and she can’t stop singing. Meiyu refuses to go on a date with Eric to a hotel. Weikang keeps his sugar mummy, Deborah (Zoe Tay), company by drinking with her. While complaining about her husband neglecting her, she takes an intimate photo with Weikang and sends it to him, claiming Weikang is her lover. Weikang panics. Big Brother’s biological mother, Quan Min’er, is on the verge of death. She wants to see him but he is indifferent. Unable to convince him to visit Min’er, Grandma Wuxia asks Weixiong for help. Big Brother finally visits Min’er in the hospital. Tearing, she holds his hands and passes away. Min’er leaves a huge fortune for Big Brother but he dismisses it. Weixiong realises he is still not over his father’s suicide.
14	"Episode 14"	16 December 2016; PG Some Sexual References
Xiaoying proposes to Jinxuan, since they have already slept with each other. Laughing at him for being old-fashioned, she states that she was merely repaying him for his gift of a diamond ring. Weixiong is astonished to see Big Brother giving $50,000 to A-jiao to settle her debts. She interrogates him, and he admits he had earned the money by investing in US stocks. To prove himself, Big Brother takes Weixiong home and starts up the computer. Porn websites pop up on the screen unexpectedly, and she leaves in a huff. Xiaoying confesses he is responsible. He did it to put a halt to their relationship, as he deems Big Brother unworthy of Weixiong, a future lawyer. Fangfang shows her support for Jinguang at the porridge stall. She wants to taste the first pot of porridge he cooks. Bangqing arranges for Fangfang to be the director and PR manager of a gold investment company. Fangfang meets up with the boss, Mr Liu, who keeps touching her. She leaves in annoyance. Luo Bei tells Lili he has quit drugs and is going to be a taxi-driver. Jealous that they are talking, A-li kicks Luo Bei. Meiyu receives a text message to meet Eric at a hotel. She remembers his threat to terminate their relationship if she refuses to accommodate his requests.
15	"Episode 15"	19 December 2016; PG Some Sexual References
Meiyu is undecided if she should meet Eric at the hotel. After a huge quarrel with Lili, she decides to go, out of spite. Big Brother shows up at the hotel unexpectedly. Eric panics and begs to be let off, for fear that the affair would smear his reputation. Weixiong finds out Weikang is involved with a married woman. They have a heated argument. Jiahui and Mahjong Auntie accuse a foreign maid of theft, but realise afterwards that they are mistaken. Teochew Auntie’s daughter, Xiuzhen (Youyi), likes Jinguang. Teochew Auntie asks him to make his first porridge for Xiuzhen, putting him in a dilemma, as he has planned to give the first bowl of porridge he makes to Fangfang. Bangqing spikes Fangfang’s drink and sends her to Mr Liu’s room. The ordeal traumatises Fangfang, and she refuses to step out of her room. After much effort by Big Brother, Fangfang finally comes out of her room. She cries bitterly in Grandma Wuxia’s arms.
16	"Episode 16"	20 December 2016; PG Some Sexual References
Jiahui is concerned that her forgetfulness is a symptom of dementia. However, she declines to visit a doctor when Weixiong suggests it. Weikang and Deborah’s affair comes to light. Deborah’s husband (Guo Liang) threatens to get even, and Weikang justifies himself unashamedly, saying Deborah had showered him with money and gifts out of her own free will. He gets a slap from Weixiong. Jinxuan is overjoyed to be cast in a drama. Xiaoying suggests a lobster meal to celebrate. Jinxuan feels nauseous just at the sound of this, and wonders if she is expecting. The pregnancy test kit turns out a positive result. Jinxuan calls George right away to extort money from him. Jinguang keeps Fangfang company and encourages her. Fangfang appreciates the gesture and assures him she will get over the ordeal. While selling lottery tickets at the hawker centre, Grandma Wuxia is insulted for having a good-for-nothing grandson.
17	"Episode 17"	21 December 2016 PG
Grandma Wuxia goes missing, and Big Brother looks high and low for her. He learns she was humiliated at the hawker centre. Weixiong catches Walter following Meimei home and confronts him. She is certain Walter likes Meimei, although Meimei denies this vehemently. Grandma Wuxia refuses to return home unless Big Brother stops idling his life away. Bangqing apologises to Fangfang by sending a huge amount of money to her father, who is in her hometown, for medical bills. Fangfang softens her stance and tells Bangqing to promise she will never need to come into contact with Mr Liu and the company again. Bangqing agrees. George is involved in a serious car accident overseas, and his condition is uncertain. His father is willing to give Jinxuan $3 million if her baby proves to be George’s. Xiaoying demands $10 million. Big Brother finally decides to go out and make a mark for himself.
18	"Episode 18"	22 December 2016; PG Some Sexual References
In the morning, Grandma Wuxia awakes to find that Big Brother has left home. She knows he is serious this time as he has left the bank passbook and other important documents behind. She is shocked to find $30,000 in their joint account. Weixiong berates Weikang for looking for sugar sisters on the Internet and insists he is going to get into trouble sooner or later. Weikang blames his impoverished background and insists it is his way of getting out of poverty. Meiyu decides to finish her studies and not attempt to take shortcuts to earn money. Walter rushes Meimei, who is suffering from food poisoning, to the hospital. When she realises she is staying in a single ward at a private hospital, she demands to switch wards, fearing the cost. It turns out that Walter is a rich man. He likes Meimei for her innocent heart. Meiyu and Lili are certain Walter is not serious about Meimei, and Lili tells her to get transferred out of her current job. Xiaoying actively solicits clients for his investment business. He gives a sum of money to Grandma Wuxia, so that she need not worry about her livelihood. There is no word from George’s family. Jinxuan decides to abort the baby and sign a contract with the TV station.
19	"Episode 19"	23 December 2016; PG Some Sexual References
George’s family agrees to give Jinxuan $10 million if it is proven that George is the father of her baby. Ecstatic, Jinxuan packs her luggage to move out. Sihai accuses Jinxuan of moving out to avoid the family’s expenses and his hospital bills. Jinguang realises Sihai wants to see her often but is too stubborn to admit it. Jinguang likes Fangfang but lacks the courage to make his first move. Xiuzhen, on the other hand, is in active pursuit of him, and warns Fangfang to stay away from him. Weikang is accused of theft by his sugar sister and arrested. Zhiming and Weixiong bail him out. Unashamed, Weikang insists he has done nothing wrong. Zhiming is so angry that he has a stroke and dies. Three years pass. Big Brother returns to Dakota Crescent. It is being redeveloped, and everything, including the people, has changed.
20	"Episode 20"	26 December 2016 PG
Big Brother returns home to find Grandma Wuxia in a worrying state of health. Jinxuan’s son is verified to be Xiaoying’s child. Her dream of getting $10 million from George’s family falls flat. She did not marry Xiaoying but lives off him. Xiaoying was involved in a gold investment scam and became the scapegoat of Bangqing and Mr Liu. Big Brother visits him in prison, and he asks Big Brother to look after Jinxuan and his son. Weixiong becomes a lawyer, and soon begins dating Zhang Zhentian (Zhang Yaodong), a senior lawyer. While in court, she loses focus and is put in unfavourable light. Zhentian advises her to control her emotions. Zhiming’s death continues to affect Jiahui deeply and her dementia worsens. Mahjong Auntie has to take care of her. A-jiao’s food business is thriving. She and Wang have applied for a five-room flat. Si Hai provision shop is converted into Si Hai Café, and Jinguang has married Xiuzhen. Jinguang takes Big Brother to an empty flat where Fangfang has been hiding.
21	"Episode 21"	27 December 2016 PG
Fangfang looks haggard and wan. She was sabotaged by Bangqing, and was imprisoned and deported. She got herself smuggled back into the country to confront Banqing, determined to bring him down with her. Big Brother points out to Jinguang that he will get into trouble on account of Fangfang. Jinguang refuses to leave her in the lurch. Big Brother treats Weixiong in their usual friendly way when they meet again. Zhentian feels uncomfortable at their exchange. Meiyu moves out, leaving Meimei to stay with Lili. Meimei has broken up with Walter. A burning smell emanates from Cardboard Auntie’s house, but Luo Bei is not around to open the door. A-li kicks the door down, and finds Cardboard Auntie dead.
22	"Episode 22"	28 December 2016 PG
In the process of kicking down Cardboard Auntie’s door, A-li hurt his foot. Luo Bei helps him sit down. They start chatting for the first time. Both regret not treasuring their loved ones while they were still around. Luo Bei encourages A-li to pursue Lili again. Meiyu is working as an assistant manager at a hotel. Although she does not have much money left after paying for her rent and other expenses, she still gives Lili an allowance. Weikang, on the other hand, is too ashamed to face his family. He believes he was the cause of his father’s death, and now his mother’s deepening dementia. He is seeing a decent girl and has stopped looking for sugar mommies to fund his lifestyle. Meiyu encounters a drunk Walter, who inquires after Meimei. Walter asks Meiyu to help fulfil Meimei’s dream of becoming a singer. Big Brother tries to alleviate Weixiong’s stress by encouraging Jiahui to get over her husband’s death. He finds her a part-time job so she can live a normal life. He also arranges for Grandma Wuxia to sell vegetables at the market. Xiuzhen questions Jinguang about the sudden increase in expenses at the porridge stall. She suspects he is keeping a mistress.
23	"Episode 23"	29 December 2016 PG
Xiuzhen demands to know if Jinguang is helping Fangfang behind her back. Sihai suddenly confesses that it is he who has been taking the money to help a divorcee. Jinguang believes Sihai, but realises later Sihai has lied, just to help him out. Jinguang realises he can no longer maintain the cover-up. He withdraws the rest of his savings and gives it to Fangfang, who is about to bid him farewell. Just then, the police arrive. Jinguang quickly hides Fangfang in Si Hai Café. Xiuzhen is pregnant. Jinguang is elated and Fangfang, who has been hiding in the storeroom, feels happy for them. Xiaoying is released from prison. Jinxuan flares up upon seeing him and starts hitting him for causing her current plight. He assures her that he will work hard to provide for her. Xiuzhen is checking stocks in the storeroom. She steps onto something and falls backwards. Fangfang cushions her fall.
24	"Episode 24"	30 December 2016 PG
Jiahui becomes more cheerful after she starts working. Weixiong regrets not treating her like a normal person. However, Zhentian insists Jiahui is sick and should be sent to a nursing home. To prove Jiahui can take care of herself, Weixiong leaves her alone at home. Jiahui misses Weikang and goes out to look for him. Meiyu persuades the boss of a music café to let Meimei sing at his café. Afraid Lili will object, Meimei is hesitant. Big Brother advises her to think things through carefully, as her decision will affect her future. Meimei agrees to try it out only if Lili will give her permission. Big Brother arranges for Xiaoying to work at Wang and A-jiao’s food stall. Unable to endure the hardship, Xiaoying wants to quit. The couple follows Big Brother’s instructions and tries various ways to make Xiaoying stay.
25	"Episode 25"	2 January 2017 PG
Jiahui goes missing. Afraid some mishap might have occurred, Big Brother goes looking for her despite feeling unwell. Weixiong tells him to go home and rest but he refuses. Jiahui cannot find the way home. A man (Michael Huang) leads her to a deserted place. Luo Bei bids farewell to Lili and thanks her and her family for taking care of Cardboard Auntie. He is glad to have met good neighbours whose support has empowered him to start life afresh. Meimei is supposed to have a singing audition at the music café. Too nervous to face the audience, she hides in the toilet. Luo Bei gives her confidence and she steps on stage, charming everyone with her angelic voice. Jinxuan lazes at home, doing nothing all day but playing computer games. She is too unmotivated to eat, and Xiaoying has to feed her. When her computer hangs, Xiaoying lets her use Big Brother’s computer. Jinxuan is baffled to find stock market analyses and charts in his computer.
26	"Episode 26"	3 January 2017; PG Some Violence
Weixiong rescues Jiahui from a man who is up to no good. The man runs away but Zhentian does not give chase, fearing for his own safety. Big Brother pursues and catches the man with Weixiong’s help. Jinxuan realises Big Brother’s stock transactions are worth more than a million dollars. Astonished, she hatches a plan. Weixiong is considering sending Jiahui to a nursing home. She discusses this with Mahjong Auntie, who opposes the idea and asserts that she can take care of Jiahui. The video of Meimei singing at the music café garners many hits. In spite of her growing popularity, she continues to be a cleaner. Lili wants her to quit the menial job but Meimei maintains she has nothing to be ashamed of. Fangfang finally locates Bangqing, who is with a social escort and living a posh life. Infuriated, Fangfang threatens to perish with him. Weikang asks Meiyu to take a birthday present to Jiahui as he is too ashamed to see her. He likes a rich girl and has decided to reform. A-li practices meditation to manage his anger. Outside Lili’s house, however, he flares up when he hears a man’s voice in the house.
27	"Episode 27"	4 January 2017; PG Some Sexual References
Jinxuan gives herself a makeover and becomes gentle in manner towards Big Brother. He tries to avoid her, but they end up falling onto the sofa together. Just then, Weixiong, Xiaoying and Grandma Wuxia happen to return home. They are shocked. Jinxuan threatens to accuse Big Brother of rape, unless he transfers his stock holdings to her. Mahjong Auntie takes Jiahui to the hawker centre. Jiahui wanders away when she is buying food. Weikang introduces his girlfriend, Bonnie (Jayley Woo), to Weixiong, who is glad to see he has become a more responsible person. Jiahui is anxious about being sent to a nursing home for repeatedly causing trouble. Weikang declares Weixiong will be irresponsible if she should put Jiahui in a nursing home. Bonnie goes to Weikang’s home at Dakota Crescent. She assures him that a person’s background does not affect his success. He is steadily losing confidence in their relationship, due to the huge disparity in their backgrounds.
28	"Episode 28"	5 January 2017; PG Some Violence
Jinxuan learns Xiaoying has struck $10 million in the Toto draw. She regrets framing Big Brother and tries to curry favour with Xiaoying, who ignores her. Yet again, Zhentian suggests Weixiong send Jiahui to the nursing home. Big Brother overhears and criticises him for being heartless. Jinguang learns Bangqing is meeting Fangfang to give her money to make up for his wrongdoings. Worried Bangqing will harm Fangfang, he follows them, along with Big Brother. Bangqing tries to run Fangfang down with his car, but Jinguang and Big Brother manage to subdue him. Fangfang decides to turn herself in. Big Brother agrees to admit to Jinxuan’s allegations, on condition he get half of Xiaoying’s Toto winnings. Meimei starts singing at Si Hai Café and attracts a lot of attention. The video of her performance goes viral, and reporters arrive to interview her. A-li cries in a burst of pride.
29	"Episode 29"	6 January 2017 PG
Jinxuan pretends to interrogate Big Brother, and he admits to the alleged rape attempt. Tired of her lies and manipulation, Xiaoying hands her the winning Toto ticket. Jinxuan goes to collect the winnings and realises they only amount to $50. Bonnie’s father (Zheng Geping) checks on Weikang and learns he has had sugar mommies in the past. Declaring Weikang does not deserve to love his daughter, he insists they break up and even threatens to tell Bonnie everything. Big Brother finds a day care centre for dementia patients like Jiahui. He hopes this will lighten Weixiong’s burden. Zhentian accuses Weixiong of having feelings for Big Brother unknowingly. He wants her to sort out her feelings before they continue their relationship. Weikang is unable to contact Bonnie. In his misery, he gets drunk. An interview with Meimei is published, and people ask for her photos and autograph. She does not like the sudden fame and wishes merely to go on being a cleaner. Meiyu is promoted and transferred overseas to be a manager. Weikang enrols in a cooking school and sets out to make Bonnie’s favourite desserts.
30	"Episode 30"	9 January 2017; PG Some Sexual References
After almost 30 years, Lili and her family are moving out of Dakota Crescent. Lili is overwhelmed with emotion. A-li wants to propose, but she stops him. Three attractive ladies stop by at Si Hai Café and ask for "Heroda". Jinguang suspects they are looking for Big Brother and directs them to Lili’s house. Observing the arrival of three posh cars, Big Brother slips away. Weixiong is astonished to learn the ladies are from top headhunting firms; they are personally seeking out Heroda, who turns out to be Big Brother. Big Brother admits that during his three-year stint in an investment firm in America, he had made excellent stock market calls and was hotly sought after. He left because he was turned off by the human propensity for greed. Zhentian demands that Weixiong draw a line between herself and Big Brother. Refusing, she breaks up with him. Big Brother expresses his love for Weixiong and hopes she will be his girlfriend. Meimei is going to Taiwan to further her singing career. At her final show at the music café, she thanks Walter for making her realise that dreams can come true. Big Brother has been observing Xiaoying working hard at Wang’s stall. He decides to secretly help the latter start his own business. Jinxuan becomes a cosmetics sales promoter. Her relationship with Xiaoying improves. Everyone gathers at Si Hai Café on its last day of operation. A film script-writer turns up, looking for interesting subjects. Big Brother tells him that although the Dakota Crescent residents are ordinary people, they can become big heroes when everyone unites.

== Webisodes ==
The webisodes are available on Toggle.

Title	Original release date
"侠女阿嫲教你$5煮3道菜 - 豆腐"	19 December 2016 G
Granny Swordswoman (Jin Yinji) demonstrates how to cook kai lan with white peony root (白芍芥兰), fried pork with celery (芹菜炒肉) and braised bean-curd (卤豆干) with only $5.
"侠女阿嫲教你$5煮3道菜 - 苦瓜"	19 December 2016 G
Granny Swordswoman demonstrates how to cook braised pork with bitter gourd (苦瓜焖猪肉), fried sweet potato leaves (清炒番薯叶) and fried eggs with tomato (番茄炒蛋) with only $5.
"侠女阿嫲教你$5煮3道菜 - 鸡翅"	19 December 2016 G
Granny Swordswoman demonstrates how to cook sweet chicken wings (甜味鸡翅), fried bell peppers with bean sprouts (青椒炒豆芽) and sunny-side up eggs (荷包蛋) with only $5.
"侠女阿嫲教你$5煮3道菜 - 小白菜"	19 December 2016 G
Granny Swordswoman demonstrates how to cook fried bok choy with oyster sauce (蚝油小白菜), chilled tofu (凉拌豆腐) and sweet and sour pork (咕咾肉) with only $5.
"侠女阿嫲教你$5煮3道菜 - 四季豆"	19 December 2016 G
Granny Swordswoman demonstrates how to cook fried corn (素炒玉米三丁), fried pork with cucumber (黄瓜爆肉丁) and fried green beans (清炒四季豆) with only $5.
"美美教你轻松打扫 - 厕所篇"	26 December 2016 G
Guan Meimei (Bonnie Loo) demonstrates how to clean the bathroom in 15 minutes.
"美美教你轻松打扫 - 厨房碗碟篇"	26 December 2016 G
Guan Meimei demonstrates how to clean the dishes in 15 minutes.
"美美教你轻松打扫 - 卧室篇"	26 December 2016 G
Guan Meimei demonstrates how to clean a bedroom in 15 minutes.
"美美教你轻松打扫 - 客厅篇"	26 December 2016 G
Guan Meimei demonstrates how to clean the living room in 15 minutes.
"美美教你轻松打扫 - 厨房篇"	26 December 2016 G
Guan Meimei demonstrates how to clean the kitchen in 15 minutes.

== See also ==
- List of MediaCorp Channel 8 Chinese Drama Series (2010s)
- Hero
