= Hero (2016 TV series) =

2016 Singaporean TV series

- 大英雄
- Genre: Family; Dramedy
- Written by: Ang Eng Tee 洪荣狄
- Directed by: Su Miao Fang 苏妙芳; Loo Yin Kam 卢燕金; Wong Foong Hwee 黃芬菲
- Starring: Shaun Chen; Chen Hanwei; Jesseca Liu
- Opening theme: 格外精彩 by Janice Yan
- Ending theme: 借你一点泪 by Power Station 等一等爱情 by Bonnie Loo 守护你 by Bonnie Loo
- Country of origin: Singapore
- Original language: Mandarin
- No. of episodes: 30 (list of episodes)

Production
- Executive producer: Jasmine Woo 邬毓琳
- Production locations: Dakota Crescent, Singapore
- Running time: approx. 45 minutes (exc. advertisements)

Original release
- Network: Mediacorp Channel 8
- Release: 29 November 2016 – 9 January 2017

Hero (Chinese: 大英雄) is a Singaporean blockbuster drama produced and telecast on Mediacorp Channel 8. It stars Shaun Chen, Chen Hanwei and Jesseca Liu as the main casts of this series, and also features cameo appearances by Zoe Tay, Rebecca Lim, Xiang Yun, Jack Neo, Carrie Wong and many more.

== Plot ==
The story revolves around the lives of Zhou Fada, Ye Xiaoying and Zhang Weixiong, who are the three ordinary characters who grew up in Dakota Crescent. A series of interesting, exciting and personal stories will unfold...

Zhou Fada, also known as Big Brother, is a man with a strong sense of justice, loyalty and compassion. He always likes to help his neighbours handle problems in need. But because of his overzealous and reckless character, his good intentions often turn out to cause more trouble than help.

Ye Xiaoying is Fada's uncle, who always dreams of achieving phenomenal success in life, but he never did live up to his dreams as he is essentially just a slacker. He is very good at keeping out of trouble, by tactically avoiding tricky situations. His motto in life is: A man's greatest power is not his fists, but his tongue. He believes that being good with words can help one sail through career and relationships smoothly, but the fact is, his career and love affairs are almost always on the rocks.

Zhang Weixiong is a manly name, but the owner of the name is actually a cute girl. When her mother was pregnant with her, the ultrasound scan showed that it was a baby boy, so her father went to the fortune teller and got her this dashing manly name. Who would have expected that it was a baby girl! But they went along with the name “Wei Xiong” after all.

Weixiong is just like her name; she has great ambitions and a gusty character, and people in the neighborhood see her as the future elite. Unfortunately, that is just her pretense. She is actually very timid and cowardly, but she believes that in order to survive in this dog-eat-dog world, you will have to “never say die”. So even though she is crumbling from fear inside, she would always put up a strong front, and her strong-headedness always gets her into trouble. If not for the help of Big Brother Fada, with this personality, she might have much consequences to suffer.

These three characters, together known as “The Great Hero”, are a threesome in the neighbourhood and from them we will get to know many other members of Dakota Crescent and their stories.

== Cast ==
- Jin Yinji as Granny Swordswoman 侠女阿嫲
- Chen Hanwei as Ye Xiaoying, Granny Swordswoman's son
- Shaun Chen as Zhou Fada, Granny Swordswoman's grandson
- Zhu Xiufeng as Granny Mahjong 麻将婆
- Brandon Wong as Zhang Zhiming 张志明, a security officer
- Pan Lingling as Xiao Jiahui 萧家慧, Zhang Zhiming's wife who is suffering from dementia
- Jesseca Liu as Zhang Weixiong 张伟雄, Zhang and Xiao's daughter, a lawyer
- Ian Fang as Zhang Weikang 张伟康, Zhang and Xiao's son
- Zhu Houren as Ou Sihai 区四海
- Andie Chen as Ou Jinguang 区金光
- Youyi as Xiuzhen 秀珍, daughter of Auntie Teochew and Ou Jinguang's wife
- Paige Chua as Ou Jinxuan 区金萱, Ou Sihai's daughter
- Nicholas Lim 林道锐 as Boy Boy 小冬瓜, son of Ye Xiaoying and Ou Jinxuan
- Chen Tianwen as Guan A-li 关阿礼, Huang Lili's ex-husband
- Aileen Tan as Huang Lili 黄丽丽, Guan A-li's ex-wife, a cleaner
- He Ying Ying as Guan Meiyu 关美玉, elder daughter of Guan A-li and Huang Lili
- Bonnie Loo as Guan Meimei 关美美, younger daughter of Guan A-li and Huang Lili, a cleaner
- Ng Suan Loi 黃晶晶 as Granny Cardboard/Cha Kwee Kiao 纸皮婆, Luo Bei's mother, a cardboard collector
- Peter Yu as Luo Bei 罗北, a taxi driver

=== Other characters ===
- Sheila Sim as Fan Fangfang 范芳芳, came from China to look for a job in Singapore
- Henry Thia as Steven
- Teddy Tang as Jack Chan, Zhang Weixiong's classmate and love interest
- James Seah as Chen Bangqing 陈邦庆, Fan Fangfang's ex-boyfriend and enemy
- Mervyn Lee 李岳杰 as Potty Mouth 臭口王, Ah Jiao's husband
- Desmond Ng as Walter Lu
- Marcus Mok 莫健发 as Eric
- Joy Yak 易凌 as Ah Jiao 阿娇
- 王慧莹 as Auntie Teochew 潮州嫂
- 马天凌 as Mr Liu 刘总
- Zhang Yaodong as Zhang Zhentian 张振天

=== Cameo appearances ===
Cast	Role	Description
Carrie Wong 黄思恬	Alexia	The three Charlie's Angels
Ya Hui 雅慧	Betty	The three Charlie's Angels
Felicia Chin 陈凤玲	Cathy	The three Charlie's Angels
Chew Chor Meng 周初明	Wei Ge 伟哥	Loan Shark Boss attending to Zhou Fada and Ye Xiaoying
Oh Ling En 胡菱恩	Student 中学学生	
Dennis Chew 周崇庆	Aunty Lucy	Reprised her role from Paris and Milan; Granny Mahjong's playmate; Was owed debt by Granny Mahjong
Tay Ping Hui 郑斌辉	Rice King 饭王	Zhou Fada's friend; Sold rice, curry sauce and a few other ingredients to Zhou Fada
Kym Ng 钟琴	Fishball Girl 鱼丸妹	Zhou Fada's friend; Sold some fishballs to Zhou Fada
Mark Lee 李国煌	Long Ge 龙哥	A mover boss who gave a job to Zhou Fada
Terence Cao 曹国辉	Xie Xian 谢贤	Xiao Jiahui's secondary school classmate; Gave Xiao Jiahui a lift home in his branded car
Jack Neo 梁志强	Liang Po Po 梁婆婆	Reprised her role from Comedy Night/Comedy Nite; Met Guan Meiyu in the Public Toilet
Zhang Zhenxuan 张振煊	George Pu	Ou Jinxuan's ex-boyfriend
Xiang Yun	Quan Min'er 权敏儿	Zhou Fada's biological mother; Suffered from a terminal disease; (Deceased - episode 13)
Zoe Tay	Deborah	Zhang Weikang's sugar mummy; Alex's wife
Wang Yuqing	Leo	
Guo Liang	Alex	Zhang Weikang's offender; Deborah's husband
Rebecca Lim	Herself	Actress
Richard Low	Old fogey 老鬼	Humiliated Granny Swordswoman at the Dakota Hawker Centre
Huang Biren	He Xuemei 何雪美	Tigeress (老虎)/Mdm Hor: Reprised her role as a prison officer from Tiger Mum; Mistook Ye Xiaoying for Antonio Chen Hongyu, who also appeared in Tiger Mum
Jeremy Chan	John	Runs a tropical fish shop
Michael Huang	Liar	Gangster who threatened Xiao Jiahui
Jayley Woo	Bonnie	Flat-chested (莫尼): Zhang Weikang's ex-girlfriend
Sora Ma	Herself	Actress; Went to Guan Meimei's concert in Episode 28
Desmond Tan	Himself	Actor; Went to Guan Meimei's concert in Episode 28
Zheng Geping	Bonnie父亲	Bonnie's father
Kenneth Chung	Himself	Radio DJ and Host for YES 933
Hong Ling	Herself	Actress
洪偉文	Mr Hong 洪编剧	Scriptwriter

== Production ==
Dakota Crescent is one of Singapore's earliest housing estates, built in 1958 by the Singapore Improvement Trust (SIT), which preceded the Housing and Development Board (HDB). In July 2014, it was decided that the housing estate would be redeveloped under the HDB's SERS scheme and all residents would have to relocate by 2016. This prompted a campaign by activists for its conservation, a work of art to be created about it and also media coverage given to Dakota Crescent.

This drama series was also produced as a means of kick-starting the commemoration of 35 years of Singapore-produced Chinese-language television in Singapore. As part of this, Mediacorp's famous Chinese-speaking comedy icons, such as characters Aunty Lucy (played by Dennis Chew) from Paris and Milan and Liang Po Po (played by Jack Neo) from Comedy Night/Comedy Nite, will be making cameo appearances in this drama.

Imaging sessions were done in end-April and early-May 2016, while the first scene was shot on 23 May. On 30 July 2016, in the nineteenth season of The Sheng Siong Show, it was also announced that Power Station will be performing the drama's ending theme. They were in Singapore to promote their "Next Station" world tour which will be held on 27 August.

A post-screening session was conducted at Dakota Crescent's Care and Friends Centre. The cast of Hero - Shaun Chen, Jesseca Liu, Chen Hanwei, Bonnie Loo, Paige Chua, Ian Fang, Sheila Sim, Youyi, He Yingying, Aileen Tan, Brandon Wong and Jin Yinji were present. The first episode of the show was also broadcast there.

== Original Sound Track (OST) ==
Song title	Song type	Lyrics	Composer	Performer	Producer
The Extraordinary 格外精彩	Opening theme song	王振声	周以力	Janice Yan 阎奕格	—
Tears 借你一点泪	Sub-theme song	姚若龙	郑楠	Power Station	—
Wait For Love 等一等爱情	Sub-theme song	乐声	邓碧源	Bonnie Loo	麦如丽
Watching Over You 守护你	Sub-theme song	高飞	Benny Wong	Bonnie Loo	麦如丽

== Accolades ==
The series has the most nominations in the Star Awards 2017, and won two, which were Best Supporting Actress and Drama Serial.

Year	Ceremony	Category	Nominees	Result	Ref
2017	Star Awards	Best Director	Wong Foong Hwee	Nominated	
2017	Star Awards	Best Screenplay	Ang Eng Tee	Nominated	
2017	Star Awards	London Choco Roll Happiness Award	Shaun Chen	Nominated	
2017	Star Awards	Bioskin Healthiest Hair Award	Desmond Ng	Nominated	
2017	Star Awards	Best Actor	Shaun Chen	Nominated	
2017	Star Awards	Best Actress	Jesseca Liu	Nominated	
2017	Star Awards	Best Supporting Actor	Andie Chen	Nominated	
2017	Star Awards	Best Supporting Actress	Paige Chua	Nominated	
2017	Star Awards	Best Supporting Actress	Pan Lingling	Nominated	
2017	Star Awards	Best Supporting Actress	Bonnie Loo	Nominated	
2017	Star Awards	Best Supporting Actress	Aileen Tan	Won	
2017	Star Awards	Best Evergreen Artiste Award	Aileen Tan	Nominated	
2017	Star Awards	Best Drama Serial	—N/a	Won	
2019	Asia Rainbow TV Awards	Outstanding Leading Actress in Comedy	Jesseca Liu	Won	
2019	Asia Rainbow TV Awards	Outstanding Comedy	—N/a	Won	
