= You Can Be an Angel Too =

- 你也可以是天使
- Genre: Medical; Nursing; Romance
- Written by: Lau Ching Poon 刘清盆
- Directed by: Wong Foong Hwee 黄芬菲; Martin Chan 陈金祥; Lim Mee Nah 林美娜; Lee Sai Hung 李世雄; Zhang Huiying 张慧盈
- Starring: Zoe Tay; Xiang Yun; Rebecca Lim; Bryan Wong; Elvin Ng; Sheila Sim; Xu Bin; Aloysius Pang
- Opening theme: Love Is Always There (爱一直都在) by Tay Kewei
- Ending theme: Responsibility (责任) by Matthew Teng (No commentaries for News Tonight)
- Country of origin: Singapore
- Original language: Chinese
- No. of episodes: 20 (list of episodes)

Production
- Executive producer: Winnie Wong 王尤紅
- Production location: Khoo Teck Puat Hospital
- Running time: approx. 45 minutes (exc. advertisements)

Original release
- Network: MediaCorp Channel 8
- Release: 5 January – 30 January 2015

Related
- You Can Be an Angel 2 (2016); You Can Be An Angel 3 (2018); You Can Be An Angel 4 (2022)

You Can Be An Angel Too (Chinese: 你也可以是天使) is a medical/nursing drama serial produced by MediaCorp Studios and aired on Channel 8. The series, which is sponsored by the Care To Go Beyond movement by the Ministry of Health of Singapore, revolves around the lives of a group of dedicated nurses at Ai De Hospital, and how they balance the passion for their job with the challenges they face in their personal lives. It stars Zoe Tay, Xiang Yun, Rebecca Lim, Bryan Wong, Elvin Ng, Sheila Sim, Xu Bin and Aloysius Pang as the casts of this series.

== Plot ==
Wang Ruojun (Zoe Tay) is a veteran Nurse Manager. At a chance encounter, she disregarded her personal safety to rescue Liu Youle (Sheila Sim) who was attacked by a ruffian. Youle felt profuse gratitude towards Ruojun. Upon receiving tender care and warm encouragement from Ruojun during her hospital stay, Youle decided to take up the nursing profession and became a well-liked nurse by her patients she has taken care of.

Ruojun and her husband, Huang Yiqiang, had been a loving couple married for years. Ruojun discovered that Yiqiang turned unfaithful and to make things worse, he was caught in the act with naked photos and being blackmailed. A cleanliness freak, Ruojun could not bring herself to forgive Yiqiang and made the painful decision to divorce. Yiqiang remained deeply in love with Ruojun and refused to let her go. He persisted and sought help from Meiying for a chance of reconciliation. However, Ruojun held no more feelings for Yiqiang. Just as she was about to start a new relationship, Yiqiang was brought down by a stroke and she was stuck in a dilemma. Ruojun was dealt with a final blow when she realized that the philandering Yiqiang not only had a one-night stand, he had even bore a child with another woman.

Software engineer Fu Jiazi (Elvin Ng) hitched a hike from his friend Ken and met with a traffic accident. Ken sustained serious injuries. As Jiazi was incapable of performing first aid, Ken died due to excessive loss of blood. Jiazi was inundated with guilt and made up his mind to switch career track by enrolling into the nursing course. His mother opposed to the decision, fortunately his father was supportive. Out of self-remorse, Jiazi got together with Ken's sister Dai Xiwen. However, Xiwen did not wish to have a relationship built from charity and broke off with Jiazi. Jiazi was the nursing mentor of Youle and both developed affection for each other with time, but Jiazi's guilt towards Xiwen prevented him from taking a step further with Youle.

Wang Ruo'en (Xiang Yun), the elder sister of Ruojun, is also a Nurse Manager. Coupled with a strong yet finicky personality, she stands against injustice, adopts a stern management style and holds high expectations. As a result, she did not get along well with people and often received complaints from the families of patients. The two sisters subsequently lost their father from illness. Ruo'en could not accept the reality and put the blame on Ruojun, causing the once-loving siblings to fall out. Thankfully through the mediation of their mother, both healed and patched up. Her mother thereafter underwent surgery and needed a caretaker for her recuperation. With another patient complaint directed at her way, Ruo'en tendered resignation in a fit of fury and moved on to be a property agent. Eventually she realized that nursing was still her true passion and returned to her original profession.

Nurse Manager Xie Yaozong (Bryan Wong) works with Ruo Jun at Ward 8A. Everyone at work calls him by the abbreviation of his name, XYZ. On the surface, Yaozong appeared a loner and miser, and turned people off with his caustic tongue. Yaozong was later stabbed and on the brink of death. There arrived an endless flow of visitors, whose lives had been touched by his kindness in the past. Only then, truth was revealed that colleagues had misunderstood Yaozong all along and they began to see him in a different light.

Guan Xinni (Rebecca Lim) is an Advanced Practice Nurse specializing in geriatrics. Exuding a cold demeanour, she is particularly aloof with men. She and her friend had suffered molestation during her schooling days; although they managed to escape from the ordeal, she remained affected by the incident. Xinni discovered that the molester then and Yaozong bore a similar birth mark and mistook Yaozong as the culprit, leading to a comedic chain of events. She even obstructed the wedding of Yaozong and her pal Yuanyuan. Yuanyuan became a runaway bride, leaving a devastated Yaozong behind. Love between Xinni and Yaozong blossomed through episodes of misunderstanding and squabble. Just as their relationship saw progress, Yuanyuan returns out of the blue. Feeling like the third party, Xinni retreated from the love triangle in agony.

Fu Jiaren (Xu Bin) is the younger brother of Jiazi. He excelled in school but did not further his studies right after completing his national service. Instead he went in search for the ideal job in life. After wandering one full circle, it dawned on him that the greatest meaning in work lies on the altruistic ability to help others and develop oneself, and extrinsic returns are immaterial. And so, he followed the footsteps of his brother and answered the calling to become a nurse.

Li Longhua (Aloysius Pang), was an ITE-graduate. Having to take care of his grandmother and their living expenses, he had to take up two jobs in the morning and night. He looks up to Xie Yaozong, who gave him a sum of money so as to continue his education, but instead he gave the sum of money to a family who needs it more. Under the influence and encouragements of Xie Yaozong, he eventually became a nurse.

== Cast ==
- Zoe Tay as Wang Ruojun
- Xiang Yun as Wang Ruo'en
- Bryan Wong as Xie Yaozong
- Rebecca Lim as Guan Xinni
- Elvin Ng as Fu Jiazi
- Sheila Sim as Liu Youle
- Xu Bin as Fu Jiaren
- Aloysius Pang as Li Longhua
- Zheng Geping as Huang Yiqiang
- Lin Meijiao as Zhou Haoyun
- Johnny Ng as Fu Guohua
- Zhu Xiufeng as Cai Meiying
- Damien Teo as Gao Tianxiang
- Jayley Woo as Dai Xiwen
- Nick Teo as Ken
- Benjamin Heng as Liu Yongming
- Chan Ning as Fang Fang
- June Lim HZ as Wu Pei Ying

== Development ==
The drama began production in June 2014 and wrapped up its filming in September 2014.

== Episodes ==
| No. | Title | Original release date |
|---|---|---|
| 1 | "Episode 1" | January 5, 2015 |
| 2 | "Episode 2" | January 6, 2015 |
| 3 | "Episode 3" | January 7, 2015 |
| 4 | "Episode 4" | January 8, 2015 |
| 5 | "Episode 5" | January 9, 2015 |
| 6 | "Episode 6" | January 12, 2015 |
| 7 | "Episode 7" | January 13, 2015 |
| 8 | "Episode 8" | January 14, 2015 |
| 9 | "Episode 9" | January 15, 2015 |
| 10 | "Episode 10" | January 16, 2015 |
| 11 | "Episode 11" | January 19, 2015 |
| 12 | "Episode 12" | January 20, 2015 |
| 13 | "Episode 13" | January 21, 2015 |
| 14 | "Episode 14" | January 22, 2015 |
| 15 | "Episode 15" | January 23, 2015 |
| 16 | "Episode 16" | January 26, 2015 |
| 17 | "Episode 17" | January 27, 2015 |
| 18 | "Episode 18" | January 28, 2015 |
| 19 | "Episode 19" | January 29, 2015 |
| 20 | "Episode 20" | January 30, 2015 |

== Accolades ==
| Organisation | Year | Category | Nominee(s) | Result | Ref. |
|---|---|---|---|---|---|
| Asian Television Awards | 2015 | Best Actress In A Supporting Role | Xiang Yun | Nominated | |
| Star Awards | 2016 | Best Screenplay | Lau Ching Poon 刘清盆 | Nominated | |
| Star Awards | 2016 | Best Set Design for Drama Programme | Wong Lab Seng 黄立成 | Nominated | |
| Star Awards | 2016 | Favourite Male Character | Xu Bin | Won | |
| Star Awards | 2016 | London Choco Roll Happiness Award | Xu Bin | Nominated | |

== See also ==
- Ministry of Health (Singapore)
