= You Can Be an Angel 2 =

- 你也可以是天使2
- Genre: Medical; Nursing; Romance
- Written by: Lau Ching Poon 刘清盆
- Directed by: Loh Woon Woon 罗温温; Cheong Yuan Ting 张愿庭; Chen Yi You 陈忆幼
- Starring: Zoe Tay; Xiang Yun; Rebecca Lim; Bryan Wong; Aloysius Pang; Xu Bin; Carrie Wong
- Opening theme: Angel (天使) by Kelly Poon
- Ending theme: 我们都没错 by Pierre Zhang (No commentaries for SingaporeToday)
- Country of origin: Singapore
- Original language: Chinese
- No. of episodes: 20 (list of episodes)

Production
- Executive producer: Winnie Wong 王尤紅
- Production location: Khoo Teck Puat Hospital
- Running time: approx. 45 minutes (exc. advertisements)

Original release
- Network: Mediacorp Channel 8
- Release: 1 November – 28 November 2016

Related
- You Can Be an Angel Too (2015); You Can Be An Angel 3 (2018); You Can Be An Angel 4 (2022)

You Can Be An Angel 2 (Chinese: 你也可以是天使2) is a Singaporean nursing series produced and telecasted on Mediacorp Channel 8 in collaboration with the Ministry of Health (Singapore). It is supported by the Care To Go Beyond movement by MOH. It stars Zoe Tay, Xiang Yun, Rebecca Lim, Bryan Wong, Aloysius Pang, Xu Bin & Carrie Wong as the casts of the second series.

== Cast ==
- Zoe Tay as Wang Ruojun 王若君, a Nurse Manager
- Xiang Yun as Wang Ruo'en 王若恩. a Nurse Manager
- Bryan Wong as Xie Yaozong 谢耀宗, a Nurse Manager and husband of Guan Xinni
- Rebecca Lim as Guan Xinni 关馨霓, an Advanced Practice Nurse
- Aloysius Pang as Li Longhua 李龙华
- Xu Bin as Fu Jiaren 傅家任
- Carrie Wong as Jin Siyan 金思彦
- Thomas Ong as Lin Bin 林彬, also known as An Mu (阿木)
- Zhu Xiufeng as Cai Meiying 蔡美英, the Wang sisters' mother
- Zheng Geping as Huang Yiqiang 黄毅强, also known as Muscle Man. Ruojun's ex-husband.
- Perez Tay 郑传峻 as Xie Bucuo 谢不错

Cameo Appearances

- Lina Ng as Ms Zhuang 庄老师
- Luisa Gan as Su Li 苏丽, a nurse in training
- Donald Chong 张俊豪 as Roy, a boy suffering from cancer
- Elvin Ng as Fu Jiazi 傅家梓
- Sheila Sim as Liu Youle 刘佑乐
- Amy Khor as herself (Senior Minister of State, Ministry of the Environment and Water Resources)

== Development ==
The drama was first announced in early 2016. This was confirmed in a commercial featuring Rebecca Lim and Aloysius Pang, right before the Care To Go Beyond commercial.

In June 2016, imaging sessions were done for the cast, and Zoe Tay, Bryan Wong, Xu Bin, Aloysius Pang and Carrie Wong attended a 3-hour nursing course at Yishun Community Hospital in preparation for the series. This course covers hand hygiene, wound care, CPR, health checkup, CADD pump and Patient-controlled analgesia (PCA).

The series held its lensing ceremony on 30 June 2016. Zoe Tay, Xiang Yun, Bryan Wong, Rebecca Lim, Xu Bin, Aloysius Pang, Zheng Geping and new additions Carrie Wong and Thomas Ong were present at the event. At the ceremony, Tan Soh Chin, Ministry of Health’s Chief Nursing Officer, thanked the cast for having “portrayed nursing so well” in the first season, and noted that the intake of nurses at the diploma and degree levels have risen for two years since 2014. He also noted that the first season "had a very good outcome and high viewership, and also had very positive responses and encouraging feedback". Tan added that the goal of the series is to "profile nursing so the public will understand the kind of work that nurses are doing, and also to give accurate information about nurses at work," and "at the same time, (to show that) the work itself is satisfying and rewarding, and that there is a career path for them to progress (along)."

Elvin Ng, who was confirmed to be part of the casting lineup, is revealed to be returning in a cameo appearance with Sheila Sim – the first season, aired and took place in 2015, was left with Sim's character going abroad for three years; and Ng went along with her.

== Episodes ==
No.	Title	Original release date
1	"Episode 1"	November 1, 2016
The annual charity sports competition is ongoing. The nurses’ team from Ai De Hospital has a high chance of winning. However, they lose when Jiaren and Yaozong step out to perform CPR on Wenhui from the lawyers’ team, who collapses unexpectedly. Jin Siyan, a rookie lawyer, is impressed that the nurses sacrificed victory to save a person’s life. Siyan goes to the hospital where her client, Zhiyuan, wants to force his father, Mingshan, to sign a will, despite having injured his fingers. Siyan is reluctant to assist in the procedure, but Mingshan is so disheartened that he simply stamps his thumbprint onto the documents. Mingshan’s condition worsens and he is placed in the ICU. Ruojun, Jiazi and Longhua manage to resuscitate him. Ruojun trips and sprains her ankle. A seemingly kind-hearted man, A-mu, helps her. Ruojun is startled when she finds her wallet missing. Noticing it in A-mu’s hand, she accuses him of stealing her money. He pretends he is in need of cash, and she gives him $100. A-mu sends flowers to Ruojun at the hospital and returns the $100. She realises she was wrong about him. As a result of attending to a patient, Xinni is late picking her son, Bucuo. Yaozong wants to train Bucuo to be independent and tells him to find his own way home. Xinni does not agree with the way he handles their son. Jiazi and Youle decide to quit their jobs to further their studies. No one can bear to see them leave. Ruojun is on the night shift. Although a patient complained about her earlier, she continues to give her utmost care to her.
2	"Episode 2"	November 2, 2016
Bucuo’s back is bruised. Xinni suspects he has been bullied by his kindergarten teacher or classmates. He refuses to tell her the truth. Siyan encounters Longhua’s grandmother collecting drink cans at a hawker centre. She admires the elderly lady for relying on herself to earn a living. She offers her help but is rejected. Longhua is mistaken for a thief by Siyan. She is embarrassed when she realises her mistake. He notices that her foot is bleeding and tends to her. He finds her an interesting person. Ruojun brings a dementia patient, Lian-jie, back to the ward. Lian-jie keeps saying she is hungry but is fussy about the food given. Yaozong is frustrated. Yaozong learns Lian-jie’s daughter is Qunfang, Bucuo’s kindergarten teacher. Xinni and Ruojun sympathise with Qunfang’s difficulties in caring for a dementia patient. Siyan gives a client a severe reprimand for abusing her maid. Yiqiang berates her after that. Just then, Longhua calls Siyan, who is in a bad mood. He asks about will writing, and she replies that she is not helping Mingshan. On the day Yiqiang and Ruojun are to sign their divorce papers, he proposes to her again. She is hesitant. Yaozong and Xinni accuse Qunfang of venting her frustrations on Bucuo and complain to the person in charge. Unable to explain herself, Qunfang quits in a rage. Bucuo finally reveals he was hit by a cleaner. Yaozong and Xinni go to Qunfang’s house to apologise. They find her lying on the ground, unconscious.
3	"Episode 3"	November 3, 2016
Qunfang wakes up in a hospital, her emotions in disarray. She rambles on about the problems she has taking care of her mother, and the nurses comfort her and promise to help. Xinni and Yaozong return to the kindergarten to clarify the situation for Qunfang. A cigarette butt is found in the toilet. Noticing Chengxin’s strange behaviour, Yaozong suspects he is the smoker. Chengxin denies this when cigarettes are found in his pillow. The smoker turns out to be Mingshan. His cigarettes are confiscated. Longhua learns he smokes when he misses his wife. Ruojun sees A-mu folding origami for sick children in the hospital. She apologises and their misunderstanding is cleared. Siyan’s father faints at home. She phones Longhua for help but he does not answer the call. She then calls Jiaren, who guides her in performing CPR. Longhua admits he likes Siyan, while Jiaren claims she is not his type. Longhua delivers dinner to the hospital for Siyan, who has been staying by her father. He is disappointed to learn she has already eaten with Jiaren. Siyan remembers a nurse who took care of her when she had cancer at a young age. The nurse turns out to be Ruojun. She tries to visit Ruojun at the hospital but is told she is on leave. Ruojun and Meiying encounter A-mu at a shopping mall and praise him for being a gentleman when he gives up his parking lot to them. They notice him buying a dress and speculate that he has a girlfriend. Longhua takes Jiaren to see Siyan and pretends to bump into her. Suddenly, he sees a man slashing Siyan with a knife from behind.
4	"Episode 4"	November 4, 2016
Siyan is sent to the hospital and her condition is deemed critical. Jiaren notices Longhua’s back has also been slashed. After being in the ICU for a day, Siyan wakes up. Longhua is overjoyed. However, he receives news of Mingshan’s passing at the same time. He regrets not allowing Mingshan to smoke during his last days. Zhiyuan confronts Longhua about Mingshan’s will. It turns out that Mingshan has left all his assets to Longshan. The latter decides to donate everything to charity, to accumulate merit for Mingshan. Siyan shares with Longhua that she was hospitalised for a long time as a child for leukemia treatment. They get to know a boy, Roy, who has leukemia and is afraid of pain and needles. Siyan manages to persuade him to accept an injection. She is glad her experience helps another person. Xinni pities Qunfang for not able to find a job. She helps her rent a flower stall to eke out a living. Yaozong finds out June’s father is Chengxin. Their father-daughter relationship turned sour after Chengxin left his wife. Longhua brings books for Siyan to keep her occupied at the hospital. After reading a meaningful book, she makes an important decision.
5	"Episode 5"	November 7, 2016
Ruojun and Meiying chance upon A-mu after arriving at the airport. They find out the dress A-mu had bought was for his sponsored child. Back at the hospital, Yaozong asks Ruojun if her relationship with Yiqiang has made any progress. She replies that Yiqiang did not join them on their holiday. On the way home, Ruojun bumps into A-mu busking in the streets, performing on his saxophone. They engage in a friendly conversation and develop good impressions of each other. Yaozong and Xinni help Qunfang set up her flower stall and are glad to be able to do so. June refuses to forgive Chengxin. He asks Longhua and Samy to pretend he is dying, so as to seek June’s forgiveness. The hoax becomes reality and Chengxin almost dies. June finally forgives him. Ruojun is feeling unwell, and Yaozong makes soup for her. A-mu shows up and invites her out to a meal. Meanwhile, Yiqiang pops by to pay her a visit. Ruojun introduces A-mu and Yiqiang to each other. Knowing his place, A-mu takes his leave. Yiqiang has changed his schedule to take care of Ruojun. Touched, she accepts when he proposes marriage. Ruojun finds a lump in her breast. A checkup shows she has stage two cancer.
6	"Episode 6"	November 8, 2016
Siyan is about to be discharged from the hospital. She has decided to become a nurse. Longhua is overjoyed, as he will get to see her more often. Siyan is 30 minutes late for the admissions interview and her application to the polytechnic course in nursing is rejected. Longhua tries to talk the admissions officer around. Wenhui has reservations about Siyan quitting her lawyer job without first securing a place in the nursing course. Siyan insists a nursing career is better than being a lawyer. Siyan is accepted by the polytechnic. The officer changed his mind after witnessing an incident that showed her kind heart. Ma Ji, a male patient injured after a fall, keeps asking to be discharged. Xinni suspects he has Parkinson’s disease. After a discussion with the doctor, she refuses to allow him to leave. On the quiet, Ma Ji leaves the hospital. Xinni is concerned, and goes to his house to check on him. It turns out that he needs to look after his paralysed daughter, A-ping. At home, Xinni persuades Yaozong to let the masked hero make an appearance. He claims the masked hero has retired. The next day, Ma Ji sees a masked man leaving money for him at his house. Ma Ji is a street cobbler. While on his way to play with his playmate, Buchuo has a chat with him. All of a sudden, Ma Ji faints. When he is taken to the hospital, Buchuo remains to tend to his shoe stall. Xinni and Yaozong panic when told Buchuo is not in school. They go in search of him.
7	"Episode 7"	November 9, 2016
Xinni and Yaozong find Buchuo at the shoe stall. He is fine, and even chases away a stranger who tries to kidnap him. Xinni and Yaozong decide to file a police report. Ruojun seeks a second opinion on her condition. The diagnosis is the same: She has second stage breast cancer. Yiqiang is away and she is alone in her misery. Afraid to tell her mother, she only confides to her late father. Ruo’en returns to Singapore. At the airport, Lanxiang trips accidentally and blames her. Meiying and Ruojun are surprised Ruo’en has come back without saying a word. Ruo’en thinks Ruojun is keeping something from her. Ruojun lies that she is having pre-marriage jitters. Dajiang meets with Ruo’en and informs her that his aunt is in Singapore and wants to meet her. Dajiang’s aunt turns out to be Lanxiang. She refuses to try to get along with Ruo’en, and Dajiang is torn between them. Siyan calls on Ruojun, who is glad Siyan is well. Siyan shares that she has enrolled in a nursing course and hopes to work with her in the future. Siyan develops a liking for Jiaren. She rejects a lunch date with Longhua, who is disappointed. Jiaren decides to help Longhua court Siyan. Rose is admitted to the hospital for colorectal cancer. While Ruojun encourages her to fight the illness, her fears for her own health are triggered. On the day they are to register their marriage, Ruojun confesses she has breast cancer and urges Yiqiang to reconsider his decision. Everyone is stunned.
8	"Episode 8"	November 10, 2016
Yiqiang hesitates, then holds Ruojun’s hand and says he is willing to marry her. However, she turns him down, saying she does not want to be a burden. Back at home, Ruo’en has a heart-to-heart talk with Ruojun. She advises her to face her illness positively. Ruojun continues to work at the hospital. Yaozong advises her to take a break from work to receive treatment. Declaring she is able to continue working, she asks him to keep her condition a secret. Rose’s chemotherapy does not seem to be improving her condition. Ruojun sympathises, especially after learning that her relationship with her husband, Jianhua, is strained. Jianhua turns up at the hospital to visit. Rose lies about her condition, saying she merely has food poisoning. When he speaks to her harshly, she chases him away. Ruojun runs after him and discloses the severity of Rose’s condition. He is unable to accept the truth. Yaozong asks Ruojun why she is not being treated for her illness. It turns out that she cannot accept she has cancer. He persuades her to undergo chemotherapy. Xinni is incensed when Yaozong leaves her to watch a movie on her own. She refuses to speak with him. Siyan begins her internship at Ai De Hospital. She learns from Ma Ji that Longhua is the masked man. Her impression of him changed, she begins to spend more time with Longhua. Jiaren is uneasy about how close they are growing.
9	"Episode 9"	November 11, 2016
Longhua and Siyan show their concern when Yaozong is in low spirits. He lets on that his wife is giving him the cold shoulder. Siyan advises him to get to the root of the problem and take her out again to another movie. Xinni forgives Yaozong, but he does not say why he had left the cinema suddenly that particular day. Suli, a nurse intern, hurts Lanxiang unintentionally. Infuriated, Lanxiang scolds her. Yaozong speaks up for Suli and asks Lanxiang to show more tolerance for rookies who have to learn from their mistakes. After work, Siyan, Longhua and Suli chat about the reasons they chose nursing. Siyan and Longhua cannot understand why Suli wants to be a nurse, since she comes from a wealthy family and had good grades. Suli faints. She is diagnosed with a brain hemorrhage and her life is in danger. Xinni is surprised to see her father, Guan Xinguo, seeking treatment at the hospital. He is disappointed to learn he is in good health. He wants to be able to see Xinni more through being ill. Guilt-stricken, Xinni invites Xinguo to move in with them, even though Yaozong objects. Yaozong is unable to say why he is against the idea, so Xinni sticks to her decision. Suli passes away soon after she regains consciousness. She allows her organs to be donated, thus saving the lives of five patients.
10	"Episode 10"	November 14, 2016
The side effects of chemotherapy leave Ruojun short-tempered. She argues with Yiqiang, who begins to feel the strain of caring for her. Ruojun insists Yiqiang should not accompany her for chemotherapy. When she faints unexpectedly after a session, A-mu rushes her to the hospital. Only then does A-mu realise Ruojun has cancer. Criticised for not taking good care of Ruojun, Yiqiang becomes tired of living the caregiver’s life. Lanxiang refuses to be discharged from the hospital unless Ruo’en picks her up. Dajiang spins a story that the hospital is haunted. Lanxiang is scared out of her wits when a girl in red clothes drifts by. Ruo’en visits Lanxiang and has a deep conversation with her. They are finally able to put their misunderstanding aside. Toting some books on fighting cancer, A-mu advises Ruojun to accept help from others. Yiqiang visits Ruojun and apologises that he is going to China to explore the options for his business. She understands that he is asking indirectly to break up with her. She respects his wishes, but after he leaves, she weeps. A-mu witnesses the entire exchange.
11	"Episode 11"	November 15, 2016
Depressed, Ruojun does not go for her second session of chemotherapy. Yaozong finds out from Ruo’en that Yiqiang is abandoning Ruojun and is infuriated. The two friends stall Yiqiang and give him a huge scolding. Guilt-stricken, he runs away. Lanxiang urges Ruo’en to marry Dajiang. Ruojun’s situation scares Ruo’en so much that she loses her confidence in marriage. Dajiang offers to wait. Jiaren discusses end-of-life care with Yaozong. He wants to be transferred to a hospice. Rose’s condition improves after further chemotherapy. She and Jianhua visit Ruojun. Jiaren brings Siyan and Longhua to visit Ruojun to encourage her. Longhua asks Siyan to help him nab the so-called “ghost” that Lanxiang has seen. Together, they expose the truth behind the sightings. He is mistaken about Siyan, thinking she is there because of Jiaren. Frustrated, she does not explain she is actually there for him, and leaves. Xinni confronts Yaozong for picking on Xinguo. Yaozong has no choice but reveal Xinguo is a pimp-cum-loanshark. Refusing to believe this, Xinni interrogates Xinguo and realises there has been a misunderstanding. Yaozong apologises to Xinguo and they reconcile. Ruojun avoids talking about her condition with Yaozong. She wants him to accompany her to a funeral parlour to choose a funeral package for herself. He stresses that she should not give up so easily and that there are many people who are genuinely concerned about her.
12	"Episode 12"	November 16, 2016
Xinni and Yaozong discuss the Buchuo’s upcoming birthday party. Buchuo tells Xinguo he wants a dog for his birthday present. Xinni refuses to allow this. She is still grieving for her dog, which died years ago. Yaozong overhears Xinguo lending money to someone but brushes it off. Buchuo is angry with Xinni for refusing to buy him a dog. She feels very sad. Yaozong teaches Buchuo to show gratitude for his mother for bringing him up. He apologises to Xinni. Buchuo makes a balloon dog with the help of his family. Afterwards, they walk the “dog” happily. Siyan is very popular in the wards. A male patient, Ken, tries to hit on her. Many male patients send thank you cards to her. Longhua is elated when Siyan accepts a dinner date with him. Unexpectedly, she hurts her feet unexpectedly, and their date has to be cancelled. Ken wants to send the injured Siyan home but she insists on waiting for a taxi with Longhua. Ken then throws his car key to Longhua, telling him to take Siyan home. Longhua returns the car to Ken, who recommends ways to earn more money. Though Longhua says he is uninterested, Ken’s words make an impact on him. Siyan agrees to have lunch with Longhua the next day. However, she has to cancel it again to help Jiaren’s young patient, Roy, fulfil his dying wishes. Jiaren tells Longhua he has decided to court Siyan. Longhua is incensed that Jiaren has betrayed his trust and their friendship turns sour.
13	"Episode 13"	November 17, 2016
Yaozong worries when chemotherapy does not improve Ruojun’s condition. However, she is optimistic. A-mu learns Ruojun likes to draw portraits and takes her out to be a street artist for a day. Although she is not very skilled, she enjoys drawing for people. Ruojun mentions that even though she has put others before her all her life, she is still happy doing so. A-mu, who’s always enjoying himself, ponders upon her words. A-mu admits to Yaozong that he likes Ruojun. He also understands she is not keen on a relationship and does not want to pressure her. Yaozong warns him not to hurt her and asks that he submit his personal particulars and resume first, before he will matchmaking them. A-mu asks Ruojun to volunteer at the old folks’ home with him. A-mu lost his parents at a young age. On their death anniversary, he cooks for the elders as an expression of filial piety towards his deceased parents. A-mu and Ruojun expose a case of domestic violence and save a mother and daughter. Their relationship takes a step forward. Yaozong discovers Xinguo has a large amount of cash and an accounts book. Shocked to learn the latter is really a loanshark, he notifies Xinni. Xinguo explains he is keeping the accounts book for a friend and it does not belong to him. Xinni chooses to believe her father. The truth comes to light when A-huo, a borrower, holds Xinni at knife point after he is driven to desperation by Xinguo.
14	"Episode 14"	November 18, 2016
Alarmed that Xinguo is indeed a loanshark, Xinni tries to persuade him to turn over a new leaf. He relents and burns his accounts books. At this moment, the police arrive and he runs away. Jiaren and Longhua reconcile and come up with a test to find out which of them Siyan likes. They send her a text message at the same time and wait for her reply. Disappointed that Jiaren receives a reply first, Longhua concedes defeat. Buchuo’s balloon dog falls into the drain. Xinguo shows up and helps him. Xinni takes Xinguo home and cleans his wounds. She convinces him to turn himself in and face his punishment bravely. Siyan meets up with Wenhui, who tells her about her new rich boyfriend. When they talk about Longhua, Siyan laments that their relationship has not made any progress. Siyan notices that Wenhui keeps coughing and advises her to go for a checkup. Jiaren is tending to Roy, whose condition has deteriorated. Roy is struggling to keep alive as he does not want to leave his mother all alone. After his mother assures him that she will be fine, Roy passes away peacefully. Roy’s mother cries bitterly. Emotionally affected, Jiaren feels he has not done his best. Siyan takes him to the seaside to comfort him, and he finds an opportunity to confess his feelings for her. She finds out about Jiaren and Longhua’s test and is furious. Siyan looks for Longhua and scolds him. Realising she actually likes him, he apologises. She refuses to accept his apology.
15	"Episode 15"	November 21, 2016
Siyan and Longhua become a couple. With his company facing financial difficulties, Zhongshan sells his condominium for a quick turnover of cash. Longhua feels helpless. Jiaren notices Chengxin squatting in a corner, holding his head, and realises he is bleeding. He tends to the wounds and takes him to the hospital. To Jiaren’s surprise, he learns Chengxin is June’s father. Knowing the relationship is strained, he offers tactful advice to June in the hope of repairing the father-daughter ties. Wenhui is hospitalised for acute liver failure. Unable to bear the thought of Wenhui dying, Siyan decides to undergo a liver donor test. Longhua, Jiaren, and Wenhui’s boyfriend, Youde, follow suit. Wenhui is moved Youde is willing to donate his liver to her. She promises to marry him once her condition stabilises. Knowing Siyan and her family are looking for a place to move in, Longhua offers to let them stay in the condominium he is renting from Jiaren. Zhongshan says he is impressed Longhua already owns a condominium at such a young age. Longhua smiles awkwardly. Longhua and Siyan bump into Ken at a restaurant and Ken offers to foot their bill. Insulted, Longhua calls on Ken to return the money. Ken stresses the importance of earning money to provide for his loved ones. Looking at how his grandmother is struggling to earn a living, Longhua starts to think about his future. Chengxin learns his wife has died. Tormented by guilt, he attempts suicide. June and Jiaren save him in the nick of time, and she and Chengxin reconcile. Seeking a better life, Longhua decides to quit his nursing job. Siyan opposes his decision but he has made up his mind.
16	"Episode 16"	November 22, 2016
Ruojun is actively fighting the cancer. Although thankful, Meiying is concerned about her relationship with A-mu. A-mu buys a pedometer for Ruojun and invites her to go exercising with him. He expresses his feelings for her and she accepts after a moment of hesitation. Ma Ji is wrongly diagnosed with Parkinson’s Disease. When he stops taking the antidepressant pills, the symptoms cease. Yaozong is overjoyed to learn Xinni is expecting. Wenhui is getting ready for the liver transplant operation. Youde backs out unexpectedly and she becomes disheartened. Siyan and Jiaren counsel her, and she decides to fulfil her wish to be photographed in a wedding gown. Fortunately, the hospital finds another suitable donor and her hopes for survival are renewed. A-mu takes Ruojun to the beach to star-gaze. They have a romantic night together, and Ruojun senses that he is the right man for her. The next morning, A-mu proposes marriage in a joking manner. Ruojun’s alarm leads him to believe he is being rejected. He has no choice but to retract his proposal. Siyan understands Longhua is trying to make more money for her sake. She gives him the money for the rent. Ruojun returns to work at the hospital. Her colleagues are holding a mini-welcome party for her when she receives news that something has happened during A-mu’s operation. Only then does she realise he had stepped forward to be a liver donor.
17	"Episode 17"	November 23, 2016
Ruojun berates A-mu for not telling her about the liver transplant operation. He explains that he did not want her to worry. Ruo’en learns Ruojun is considering A-mu’s proposal. She does not believe in marriage and is not convinced A-mu has the means to start a family. She meets with him and even get a private investigator to check his background. Longhua embarks on a new career in investment consulting. He tries hard to persuade Ruojun, Chengxin and his former hospital colleagues to invest their money. Siyan invites Longhua out to dinner but he is too busy with his work. His grandmother disapproves of him leaving his nursing job to be an investment consultant. She warns him to be careful not to lose his clients’ money. The private investigator reports that A-mu is a divorcee and had previously owned an Internet company. Court records show his refusal to pay alimony to his ex-wife. Stunned, Ruojun asks A-mu why he has never told her about his past. He replies that he has his reasons. Wenhui wants to meet the liver donor. Yaozong arranges for them to meet. A-mu tells Ruojun about his previous marriage. Ruojun senses that he has yet to put the past behind him and suggests a temporary separation, so that he can sort out his feelings for his ex-wife. Yaozong is so attentive to the pregnant Xinni that she worries Bucuo will feel neglected. Back home, they find Bucuo unconscious. It looks like he had been electrocuted by an old fan. Xinni tries immediately to resuscitate him.
18	"Episode 18"	November 24, 2016
The unconscious Bucuo is sent to the hospital. Traumatised, Xinni blames Yaozong for indirectly causing his plight. Longhua is caught up with his work and does not keep his promise to go out with Siyan and his grandmother. Siyan is unhappy but speaks up for him. Siyan admits to Jiaren that she and Longhua are drifting apart. He advises her to give Longhua some time and to talk things out with him. The doctor certifies that Bucuo is brain-dead. Xinni refuses to accept this, but Yaozong comes to terms with the diagnosis and decides to remove the life-support machinery. Friends come to say their farewells. Xinni arrives at the last moment and makes a cast of Bucuo’s hand as a keepsake. He passes away peacefully in Xinni and Yaozong’s arms. Back at home, Xinni flares up when she sees the old fan. She breaks it with a hammer. Her relationship with Yaozong is so strained that they are unable to face each other. Ruojun tries to mediate between Xinni and Yaozong. She persuades Xinni to let go of her anger and allow the tension to dissipate. Longhua buys tickets to a musical at the 11th hour and asks Siyan to watch it with him. She cancels her lunch date with Wenhui apologetically and rushes to the venue. However, Longhua does not show up. She is furious. When Longhua explains why he had missed the musical, Siyan is not convinced by his explanation. Disappointed in him, she asks to break up. Xinni asks Yaozong for a divorce.
19	"Episode 19"	November 25, 2016
Dumbfounded by Xinni’s insistence on a divorce, Yaozong refuses to agree. She makes plans to move out, but he offers to move out instead. Yaozong works the night shift and secretly prepares Xinni’s meals for her in the morning without her knowledge. Ruojun misses A-mu and sends him a text message. She feels happy when she receives a reply. Yaozong is offended by a patient’s family and wants to quit his job. Ruojun pacifies him. Back at home, Xinni would rather eat instant noodles than the food Yaozong has cooked. She misses Bucuo a lot. Longhua tries to reverse the situation with Siyan but to no avail. Infuriated, his grandmother insists he get her back. He feels helpless. Xinni demands Yaozong should never disturb her again. Ruojun tells her that she is being selfish, but Xinni is bent on a divorce. Yaozong breaks down. Jiaren is unable to help Longhua and Siyan patch up. Longhua returns home to find his grandmother unconscious, and rushes her to the hospital. Her condition is unstable. He regrets not sparing the time to talk to her that morning.
20	"Episode 20"	November 28, 2016
Yaozong seeks earnestly to reconcile with Xinni but to no avail. Xinni picks Xinguo up when he is released from prison. He learns Bucuo has died and that Xinni is seeking a divorce. He replays an old video for her and she realises Bucuo had made his apologies to her only because Yaozong had intervened. Xinni gives vent to her frustrations through boxing. Yaozong stops her and tells her not to hurt herself and her unborn child. When she discloses that she has miscarried, he is stunned. He is floored by Xinni several times but refuses to be daunted. Touched, she wavers and they eventually patch up. Ruojun agrees to meet Yiqiang but has second thoughts. She tells A-mu that Yiqiang has donated $100,000 to the hospital under her name. Without hesitation, A-mu donates $110,000 to the hospital under Yiqiang’s name in return. She is moved. Longhua is guilt-stricken that his grandmother is still in a coma. He wants to know what she had wanted to tell him that particular day. Siyan replies that his grandmother had wanted to urge him to go back to being a nurse. Yaozong is promoted. Longhua asks to resume his nursing duties. Ruo’en encounters Dajiang at Ma Ji’s house. He is making charity food deliveries to the needy. She finds out the chocolates and flowers she received were sent by him. They reconcile. Xinni is expecting again, and both she and Yaozong are anxious. She wants him to promise that if something happens, he must save the child without regard for her well-being. She does not expect that he will really have to make a life-or-death decision.

== Accolades ==
Year	Ceremony	Award	Nominee	Result	Ref
2017	Asian Television Awards	Best Actress in a Leading Role	Zoe Tay	Nominated	
2017	Star Awards	Best Director	Loh Woon Woon	Nominated	
2017	Star Awards	Best Screenplay	Lau Ching Poon	Nominated	
2017	Star Awards	Young Talent Award	Donald Chong	Won	
2017	Star Awards	Young Talent Award	Perez Tay Chuan Jun	Nominated	
2017	Star Awards	Best Theme Song	天使	Nominated	
2017	Star Awards	Best Actress	Zoe Tay	Won	
2017	Star Awards	Best Actress	Rebecca Lim	Nominated	
2017	Star Awards	Best Drama Serial	—N/a	Nominated	

== See also ==
- Ministry of Health (Singapore)
