= Deleted (film) =

2022 Singaporean-Malaysian film

- Singaporean theatrical release poster
- Chinese: 越界
- Literal meaning: "Out of bounds"
- Hanyu Pinyin: Yuèjiè
- Directed by: Ken Ng Lai Huat
- Screenplay by: Stanley Lim; Lim Chin Siew
- Story by: Ken Ng Lai Huat; Zheng Geping
- Produced by: Keoh Chee Ang
- Starring: Zheng Geping; Tien Hsin; Rosyam Nor; Vincent Ng; Fattah Amin; Zhu Houren; Henley Hii; Peter Davis; Brie Benfell; Marcio Sebsam; Jack Neo
- Cinematography: Jack Chen
- Edited by: Heng Yin-chau; Iris Low
- Production companies: 8028 Holdings; Artistes Marketing Asia
- Distributed by: Clover Films (Singapore)
- Release dates: 15 September 2022 (Malaysia); 3 November 2022 (Singapore)
- Running time: 90 minutes
- Countries: Singapore; Malaysia
- Languages: Mandarin; English; Malay; Thai

Deleted (Chinese: 越界), titled Deleted: Akan Kujejak! in Malaysia, is a 2022 Singaporean-Malaysian action drama film directed by Ken Ng Lai Huat. Executive produced by Zheng Geping, the film follows Zhongyi, a former detective who sets about tracking down his kidnapped daughter and apprehend those responsible. The film stars Zheng, Tien Hsin, Rosyam Nor, Vincent Ng, Fattah Amin, Zhu Houren, Henley Hii, Malaysian mixed martial arts fighter Peter Davis, British boxer Brie Benfell, Malaysian-Brazilian fighter Marcio Sebsam and Jack Neo.

It was released in Malaysia on 15 September 2022, and in Singapore on 3 November 2022.

== Cast ==
- Zheng Geping as Chia Zhongyi
- Tien Hsin as Teh Shanshan
- Rosyam Nor as Ali Yusof Bin Sulaiman
- Vincent Ng as Vincent Yong
- Fattah Amin as Mohd Aron Bin Ismail
- Zhu Houren as Fan Dongtian (Four-Faced Buddha)
- Henley Hii as Fan Mingkang (Saviour)
- Charice Low as Hazel Chia Li May
- Pablo Amirul as Bank
- Peter Davis as Ghost
- Brie Benfell as Fox
- Marcio Sebsam as Tanker
- Darwin as Bulldog
- Mia Deen as Aisha Binti Ali Yusof
- Fabian Loo as Fan Zhikang (Shawn)
- Rayson Tan as Officer Su
- Jack Neo as Wu Haisen
- Paul Murray as Dr. Trump
- Haoyu as Officer Hong
- Wai Hoong as Kelvin Zhang
- Frederick Lee as Officer Huang
- Eric Chen as CID James

== Production ==
The film was produced with the support of Malaysia's Ministry of Home Affairs and the National Strategic Office Council for Anti-Trafficking in Persons & Anti Smuggling of Migrants (NSO MAPO). Filming began in 2019, and post-production was completed in 2020. Theatrical release was delayed for two years due to the COVID-19 pandemic.

Zheng Geping was the executive producer of the film.

== Critical response ==
8 Days gave the film two out of five stars, criticizing its dialogue, casting and action sequences, adding that the film turns into an "accidental shriek-fest when Jack Neo turns up in a cameo".

== Awards and nominations ==
Awards	Category	Recipient	Result	Ref.
Madrid International Film Festival 2022	Outstanding Leading Actor	Zheng Geping	Won	
