= Xu Bin =

Chinese actor (born 1989)

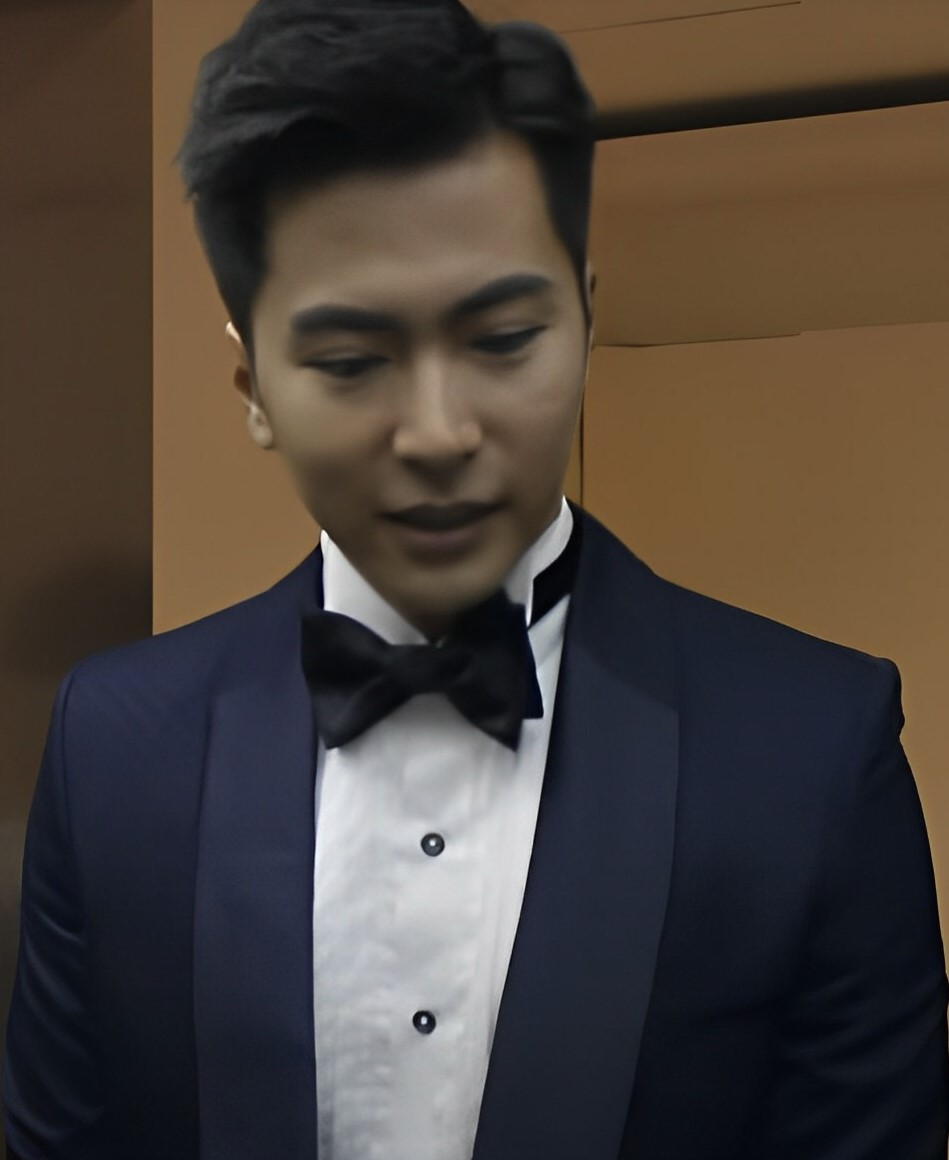
- Xu in April 2017
- Born: 19 February 1989 (age 37); Fuzhou, Fujian, China
- Education: Woodlands Ring Secondary School
- Alma mater: Temasek Polytechnic
- Occupations: Actor; singer
- Years active: 2011–present
- Agent: NoonTalk Media
- Spouse: Evelyn Wang Yifei (m. 2017)
- Children: 2
- Awards: Full list
- Musical career
- Genre: Mandopop

Chinese name
- Chinese: 徐彬
- Hanyu Pinyin: Xú Bīn

Xu Bin (born 19 February 1989) is a China-born Singaporean actor. He is managed by NoonTalk Media and was named as one of the 8 Dukes of Caldecott Hill.

== Early life and education ==
Xu was born in Fuzhou, China, and moved to Singapore to pursue his studies. When he was 17, he participated in Singaporean singing competition Campus SuperStar, representing Woodlands Ring Secondary School, but was eliminated during the first round of competition. Xu then studied at Temasek Polytechnic and graduated in 2012.

== Career ==
In 2012, Xu was given a role in Singaporean movie Timeless Love.

In 2013, Xu was awarded the Favourite Male Character in Star Awards 2013. In 2014, he was nominated the Most Favourite On-screen Couple with Julie Tan in Star Awards 20. In 2015, Xu released his second single, 几分之几. He also took part in an online variety show, 来吧！上课啦！. In 2020, Xu was appointed as the spokesperson for Beijing 101 Hair Consultants.

== Personal life ==
On 3 November 2017, Xu and Evelyn Wang Yifei held their wedding ceremony in Singapore. They subsequently held two more ceremonies in their respective hometowns, Fujian and Wuhan. Wang is a Beijing Film Academy graduate who chose to help in her family's property business instead of entering the entertainment industry. Both met at a mutual friend's party in 2014. However, their relationship was kept hidden as NoonTalk Media, Xu's managing agency, had a dating ban for all its artistes, which was lifted in 2016 for Xu and Aloysius Pang as they had "reached the right age".

On 10 July 2018, Xu announced the birth of his first child, a son, Ethan Xu. Ethan's name was among the English names shortlisted by Aloysius Pang before his death who was asked to help to give the baby an English name. On 12 March 2021, Xu announced the birth of his second child, a daughter,. As of 2022, the Xu family is based in Singapore.

== Filmography ==
=== Film ===
Year	Title	Role	Notes	Ref.
2012	Timeless Love	Sky		
2019	Old Is Gold: The Bliss Keeper	You Qinggang	Telemovie	
2022	My Star Bride - Hi, Mai Phương Thảo	Zhong Shijie	Telemovie	

=== Web series ===
Year	Title	Role	Notes	Ref.
TBA	Miss Tanya		Douyin miniseries	

=== Television series ===
Year	Title	Role	Notes	Ref.
2012	It Takes Two	Tony		
2012	Poetic Justice	Xiao Hei		
2012	Don't Stop Believin'	Zhong Junliang		
2013	Gonna Make It	Oscar Yang Yuanshuai		
2013	The Recruit Diaries	Qin Sheng		
2013	It's a Wonderful Life	Young Hao Huixian		
2014	118	Hong Shunshui		
2014	Against The Tide	Guo Jingcheng		
2014	Spice Up	Simon		
2014	World at Your Feet	Liao Huancong		
2014	Yes We Can!	Li Yi		
2015	Crescendo	Jiang Chufan		
2015	A Blessed Life	Huang Jiaquan		
2015	You Can Be an Angel Too	Fu Jiaren		
2016	118 II	Hong Shunshui		
2016	You Can Be An Angel 2	Fu Jiaren		
2016	The Queen	Zhang Minghui		
2018	Magic Chef	Ray		
2018	Dream Walkers	Guo Dilun		
2018	Doppelganger	Li Zijian		
2018	118 Reunion	Hong Shunshui	Cameo	
2019	Old Is Gold	You Qinggang		
2019	Hello Miss Driver	Zhao Yiyang		
2020	Victory Lap	Yu Shuai		
2020	A Quest to Heal	Li Jishi		
2020	A Quest to Heal	Li Shizhen		
2021	My Star Bride	Zhong Shijie		
2021	My Mini-Me And Me 很久以后的未来	Zhang Zhendong		
2021	The Heartland Hero	Fan Jieming		
2022	Genie In a Cup	Ma Deming		
2022	Love at First Bite (遇见你，真香)	Martius Shen Mingxing		
2024	Kill Sera Sera	Lin Guoguang		
2025	Fixing Fate			

== Discography ==
=== Singles ===
Year	Title	Album	Label
2013	"号角响起"	Non-album single	NoonTalk Media
2015	"幾分之幾"	Non-album single	NoonTalk Media

=== Compilation albums ===
Year	English title	Mandarin title
2015	MediaCorp Music Lunar New Year Album 15	新传媒群星金羊添吉祥
2016	MediaCorp Music Lunar New Year Album 16	新传媒群星金猴添喜庆
2017	MediaCorp Music Lunar New Year Album 17	新传媒群星咕鸡咕鸡庆丰年
2018	MediaCorp Music Lunar New Year Album 18	新传媒群星阿狗狗过好年
2022	MediaCorp Music Lunar New Year Album 22	新传媒群星旺虎泰哥迎春乐

== Awards and nominations ==
Organisation	Year	Category	Nominated work	Result	Ref.
New York Festivals TV & Film Awards	2022	Best Performance by an Actor	My Mini-Me And Me	Silver	
Star Awards	2013	Favourite Male Character	Don't Stop Believin'	Won	
Star Awards	2014	Star Awards for Most Popular Regional Artiste (Malaysia)	—N/a	Nominated	
Star Awards	2014	Top 10 Most Popular Male Artistes	—N/a	Won	
Star Awards	2014	London Choco Roll Happiness Award	The Recruit Diaries	Won	
Star Awards	2014	Favourite Male Character	Gonna Make It	Nominated	
Star Awards	2014	Favourite On-screen Couple	Gonna Make It	Nominated (Note: Shared with Julie Tan)	
Star Awards	2015	Top 10 Most Popular Male Artistes	—N/a	Won	
Star Awards	2015	Favourite Male Character	Against The Tide	Nominated	
Star Awards	2015	Toggle Outstanding Duke Award	—N/a	Won	
Star Awards	2016	Top 10 Most Popular Male Artistes	—N/a	Won	
Star Awards	2016	Favourite Male Character	You Can Be an Angel Too	Won	
Star Awards	2016	London Choco Roll Happiness Award	You Can Be an Angel Too	Nominated	
Star Awards	2016	Toggle Most Beloved Celebrity BFF award	—N/a	Nominated (Note: Shared with Aloysius Pang)	
Star Awards	2017	Top 10 Most Popular Male Artistes	—N/a	Nominated	
Star Awards	2019	Best Supporting Actor	Doppelganger	Nominated	
Star Awards	2021	Top 10 Most Popular Male Artistes	—N/a	Nominated	
Star Awards	2022	Best Actor	My Star Bride	Nominated	
Star Awards	2022	Favourite Male Show Stealer	My Star Bride	Won	
Star Awards	2022	Favourite CP	My Star Bride	Won (Note: Shared with Chantalle Ng)	
Star Awards	2022	Top 10 Most Popular Male Artistes	—N/a	Won	
Star Awards	2023	Favourite CP	Genie In A Cup	Nominated (Note: Shared with Chantalle Ng)	
Star Awards	2023	Favourite CP	Love At First Bite	Won (Note: Shared with Tasha Low)	
Star Awards	2023	Favourite Male Show Stealer	Love At First Bite	Nominated	
Star Awards	2023	Top 10 Most Popular Male Artistes	—N/a	Won	
Star Awards	2025	Best Supporting Actor	Kill Sera Sera	Nominated	
Star Awards	2025	Top 10 Most Popular Male Artistes	—N/a	Won	
Star Awards	2026	Best Actor	Fixing Fate (as Chen Chun Lin)	Nominated	
Star Awards	2026	Top 10 Most Popular Male Artistes	—N/a	Won	
