= 118 (TV series) =

Singaporean long-running TV series

- Also known as: 要要发
- Genre: Socio-drama; Dramedy; Family; Christmas; Chinese New Year; Musical
- Written by: Ang Eng Tee
- Directed by: Wong Foong Hwee; Lin Mingzhe; Qiu Jian Ting; Martin Chan; Fu Zibing; Zhang Huiying; Cheong Yuan Teng; Gao Shu Yi
- Starring: Chew Chor Meng; Pan Lingling; Dennis Chew; Ya Hui; Xu Bin; Hong Ling
- Opening theme: 够力够力 by Jack Neo
- Ending theme: 118 by Chew Chor Meng, Chen Hanwei, Cavin Soh, Dennis Chew, Xu Bin, Ya Hui, Pan Lingling, Dawn Yeoh & Liu Lingling; 重來 by Cavin Soh & Chew Chor Meng; 最美的旅行 by Ruth Kueo; 明信片 by Wu Hui Bing / Matthew Teng
- Country of origin: Singapore
- Original languages: Mandarin, with some English dialogue
- No. of seasons: 1
- No. of episodes: 255

Production
- Executive producer: Chong Liung Man 张龙敏
- Producer: Paul Yuen 袁树伟
- Running time: 22 minutes (without advertisements)
- Production company: Mediacorp

Original release
- Network: Mediacorp Channel 8
- Release: October 20, 2014 – October 16, 2015

Related
- 118 II (2016 - 2017); 118 Reunion (2018); Kopi-O II; Holland V Double Happiness; Double Happiness II; Portrait of Home; Love Blossoms; Love Blossoms II

118 (Mandarin Chinese: 要要发) was a Singaporean drama produced by Mediacorp Channel 8. It stars Chew Chor Meng, Pan Lingling, Dennis Chew, Ya Hui, Xu Bin and Hong Ling as the cast of this series.

The show replaced the second half of the 7.00 pm drama timeslot, airing at 7.30 pm to 8.00 pm on weekdays, making the 1st long form half an hour drama airing together with news-current affairs programme Hello Singapore at 6.30pm. It is the longest running Chinese drama produced by Mediacorp.

== Plot ==
Hong Daming is a kopitiam owner. As his kopitiam and house number are both "118" and the numerals sounded like Yeo Yeo Huat or 要要发, the people around Hong gave him the nickname of "118", much to his delight. Together with his wife, Liu Meimei, he makes a living by running a traditional kopitiam. Hong was well-known and well-liked in Tiong Bahru such that whenever someone is in need, they would always seek Hong for help.

Hong and his family lives in a 3-room Housing and Development Board Flat and shophouse directly above his kopitiam, which was built during the pre-war years, both of which are also located at Tiong Bahru as well. He has four children named Wang Shunfeng, Hong Shunshui, Hong Jinzhi and Wang Yuye.

Despite the family of six living in a shophouse, Hong rents out a room to Li Weiliang, known as "Ah Niang" to others, a middle-aged man. Li had studied fashion design in France, but circumstances led him to simply run a stall at Yeo Yeo Huat, selling zongzi with the recipe that his mother left for him.

Li was not the only addition to the cramped flat. Later, Meimei's elder sister, Liu Jiejie and her family also came to live with the Hong family when her husband, Zhang Tiancheng's business failed. Daming's own younger sister, Hong Shanshan, and her daughter Viveka Lee also came to live with him "temporarily" when her husband Alex Lee disappeared mysteriously. Kind-hearted by nature, Hong felt that they must have come to him because they were at their wit's end. He make room for them by having his own sons Shunfeng and Shunshui sleep in the living room and sleeping at Yeo Yeo Huat himself, than to reject them.

Hong's eldest daughter Jinzhi also run a stall selling wonton noodles and his best friend Lin Zhigao run another stall selling fried bee hoon at Yeo Yeo Huat as well, and even allowed Zhang Tiancheng and his family sell pizzas, spaghettis and beers at Yeo Yeo Huat during the evening and night and convert the kopitiam into a restaurant by placing a few board labels to allow them to do business at night.

== Cast ==
- Chew Chor Meng as Hong Daming 洪达明, the owner of Yeo Yeo Huat, a traditional kopitiam
  - Xu Bin portrayed a teenage Hong
- Pan Lingling as Liu Meimei 刘媚媚, the wife of Hong Daiming and former getai singer along with her elder sister Liu Jiejie
  - Fang Rong portrayed a teenage Liu
- Dennis Chew as Wang Shunfeng 王顺风
  - Alston Yeo portrayed a younger Wang
- Ya Hui as Hong Jinzhi 洪金枝, Wonton Noodles stall owner
- Xu Bin as Hong Shunshui 洪顺水, Hong Daming and Liu Meimei's son. Xu also portrayed as a teenage Hong Daming.
- Hong Ling as Wang Yuye 王玉叶, a polytechnic student
- Liu Lingling as Liu Jiejie 刘洁洁, Zhang Tiancheng's wife and Liu Meimei's elder sister, a former getai singer along with her younger sister Liu Meimei
  - Huang Jia Qi portrayed a younger Liu
  - Leron Heng portrayed a teenage Liu
- Chen Tianwen as Zhang Tiancheng 张天成, Liu Jiejie's husband, a former businessman whose business failed.
- Dawn Yeoh as Zhang Keke 张可可, Zhang Tiancheng and Jiahui's daughter
- Nick Teo as Zhang Zhenhui 张振辉, Zhang Tiancheng and Liu Jiejie's son, a private university student
- Carrie Wong as Zhang Ke Ai 张可爱, Zhang Tiancheng and Yue E's daughter
- Sheila Sim as Hong Shanshan 洪姗姗, Hong Daming's younger sister
- Seth Ang 翁兴昂 as Alex Lee, Hong Shanshan's husband, an artist
- Sun Yi En 孙艺恩 as Viveka Lee, Hong Shanshan and Alex Lee's daughter
- Choy Peng Hoy 蔡平开 as Er-gu 二姑, Lin Zhigao's mother
- Cavin Soh as Lin Zhigao 林志高, Hong Daming's best friend
- Youyi as Xie Limei 谢丽美, Lin Zhigao's wife
- Nikole Law 刘宜梦 as Carrie, Lucas Chew and Xie Limei's daughter
- Zhu Yuye 朱玉叶 as Rose, James Li's Ex-Wife
- Zhang Zhenxuan as Clinton Li Chengfeng 李承锋, Rose and James's elder son
- Seraph Sun as Ella Li, Rose and James's younger sister, Albert Lim's Wife
- 李健汉 as James Li, Rose Li's Ex-Husband
- 柯迪宏 as Albert Lim, Ella Li's Husband
- Charles Lee 李家庆 as Li Zhihao 李志浩
- Chen Huihui as Huang Mei 黄枚, Li Zhihao's mother and Li Kuncheng's third wife
- Chen Jiahui 陈佳慧 as Isabel, Huang Mei's Assistant
- Marcus Mok 莫健发 as Li Kuncheng 李昆诚, Li Zhihao's father
- Sora Ma as Chen Meizhen 陈美珍, Uncle Chen's granddaughter
  - Chloe Ng portrayed a younger Chen
- Tan Tiow Im 陈天祥 as Uncle Chen 陈伯, Hong Daming's old neighbour and Chen Meizhen's grandfather. He owns a provision shop.
- Lawrence Wong as Zhang Jiabao 张家宝, regular patron of Yeo Yeo Huat Kopitiam and Hong Jinzhi's childhood friend and love interest
- Alan Yeo Thiam Hock 杨添福 as Zhang Jingui 张金贵, Zhang Jiabao's father
- Roy Li as Li Mingfa / Zhang Meiyou 张没友, a former getai performer. Zhang was Liu Meimei's former lover and the father of Hong Jinzhi. Zhang's mother is Granny Egg. His name is based on Hong Kong singer Jacky Cheung (张学友/張學友).
- Cat Ang 翁慧霖 as Sister Blossom 花姐, a florist
- Ang Twa Bak 洪大目 as Granny Egg 鸡蛋婆 who sell eggs at Tiong Bahru Market.
- Chen Hanwei as Li Weiliang 李伟良, Hong Daming's and Liu Meimei's tenant and best friend. Li owns a zongzi Stall at Yeo Yeo Huat kopitiam.
  - Jay Goh Jun Hui portrayed as teenage version of Li
- Ye Shipin as Uncle Steven, Hong Daming's old neighbour and friend, who works as a supermarket stock taker
- 方进平 as Chen Guoqiang 陈国强 (Ah Qiang 阿强), Steven's eldest son
- Priscelia Chan as Tang Sijia 唐思嘉. Tang is the wife of Max Chan and they have a daughter Glory. She was Li Weiliang's former lover.
  - Vainy Sansai portrayed a teenage version of Tang
- Jaylynn Loh 卢乐慈 as Glory, Max Chan and Tang Sijia's daughter

Cast	Role	Description
Wang Yuqing	Duan Ah Zhi 段阿直	Liu Jiejie's loyal fan Teenage version portrayed by Renfred Ng
Tay Yong Meng 郑荣铭	Peter	Hong Shunshui's colleague at the car showroom
Ramesh	Vas	A regular patron of 118 who has just gained Singaporean citizenship Liaison Officer of the Neighbourhood Watch Zone; Organized the CPR session at the community club
Shine Koh 高慧姍	Eve	Zhang Zhenhui's classmate/girlfriend who was pregnant with Zhenhui's child David's ex-girlfriend
Benjamin Heng	Max Chan	Tang Sijia's husband Lawyer
Silver Ang 洪子惠	Jane	Max Chan's mistress and employee
Qiu Shengyang 邱胜扬	Himself	Capital 95.8FM DJ; A customer of 118; Volunteer Special Constabulary officer
陶樱	Yue E 月娥	Moon; Zhang Ke Ai's mother Zhang Tiancheng's Ex-Wife; Likes Lin Zhigao; Resides in Ipoh, Malaysia
Hayley Woo	Vivian	Hong Daming's adopted daughter and goddaughter Liu Meimei's goddaughter Susan's Daughter
Hu Wensui	Bobby Koh	KC15's triad boss who claims the triad is a football team Zhang Jiabao's ex-buddy
Teo Ser Lee 张思丽	Jiahui 家惠	Zhang Ke Ke's Mother; Zhang Tiancheng's Ex-Wife; Remarries to a new husband from Australia and resided there
Jason Sim 沈煇	Lucas Chew	Main Antagonist of part two Xie Limei's ex-lover Carrie's father Countlessy tempted Xie Limei to go to the casino ship to gamble and threatened to sell Carrie off Made Carrie sell tissue paper and chased her out of the house
Esther Goh 吴秋仪	Carol	Li Zhihao's cousin Initially made many attempts to break Hong Jinzhi and Li Zhihao up Approved to their marriage after Hong Jinzhi saved her and Huang Mei from a burglar and robber in New York City, United States in Episode 198
Jin Yinji	Mary Wong	Hong Shunshui's and Zhang Keke's client Rich and eccentric old woman
Li Yuejie 李岳杰	Gan Dawei David	Friend of Diana Bon, acquaintance and friend of Hong Shanshan; Famous designer
Cansen Goh 吴开深	Eric Teo	Villain; Hong Shunshui's Enemy; Peter's client Tycoon's son Likes Zhang Ke Ai and kept Zhang Ke Ai for 3 months Claimed to have a video of his intimate times with Zhang Ke'ai and blackmailed her with it

- Jim Koh 许晋鸣 as Seventh Duke 七公子, a fishmonger at Tiong Bahru Market
- Zheng Yiqin 郑逸钦 as Zheng Yiqin 郑逸钦, a vegetable stall owner at Tiong Bahru Market
- Theresa Cai Yunjun 蔡韵君 as Auntie Fruit 水果嫂, a fruit stall owner at Tiong Bahru Market
- Tang Shaowei 唐绍炜 as Ah Qing 阿清, a migrant worker who works as a cleaner at Tiong Bahru Market
- He Bin何滨 as Auntie Bun 包嫂, a stall owner selling Chwee Kueh and Buns at Tiong Bahru Market
- Chen Zonghua 陈宗华 as Ah Hong 阿洪, the boss of a Getai company
- Michelle Tay 郑荔分 as herself, a host at a Getai
- Qiqi 琦琦 as An An 安安, a getai performer
- Royston Ong 王俊雄 as Wang Fudi 王福弟. Wang is Hong Daming's buddy and also Wang Shunfeng and Wang Yuye's biological father.
- Zhang Xinxiang as Wang Fuhai 王福海, Wang Fudi's younger brother
- Gary Tan 陈毅丰 as Ah Wei 阿威, a KC15's triad member
- Bryan Chung 钟肇峰 as Tony, KC15's triad member
- Joy Yak 易凌 as Susan 苏珊, Hong Daming's and Liu Meimei's friend who was Liu's former rival in the getai industry. Susan is also Vivian's mother.
- Michael Kwah 柯宗耀 as David / Ah King, Zhang Jiabao and Bobby's friend and a drug supplier
- James Fong 方伟豪 as Big Mouth 大嘴 who owns a handphone repair shop
- Lin Mingzhe 林明哲 as a producer and director at Mediacorp and had directed the drama series Life - Fear Not
- Cheong Yuan Ting 张愿庭 as Ms Jin 金编审, a scriptwriter who had written for the drama series The Golden Way (金色大道), I Love My Pretty Babe (我爱我的漂亮宝贝), Tiger Mum @ Home (家有虎妈) and Life - Fear Not.
- Chloe Wang as Ada Zhou Min 周敏, a rich man's daughter and Simon Liu's wife and shared a rental room with Zhang Ke Ai at Lin Zhigao's house
- Allen Chen 陈祎伦 as Simon Liu. Ada's husband
- Mu Qing 穆青 as Xu Zhen Jennifer 徐珍, a foreign worker from China and works as a prostitue

=== Cameo appearance ===
Note: Only credited cameos are listed.

- Chen Meiling 陈美龄 as Hong Daming's mother
- Zoe Tay as herself, Lin Zhigao refused her as a taxi customer as Lin was on a call
- 庄义川 as a passerby who grabbed Zhang Meiyou by the collar after Zhang pestered him looking for his daughter
- 卢冠耀 as middle-aged man who is Chen Meizhen's former boyfriend
- 廖永辉 as Simon's steward
- Lee Tze Yuan and Emily Sin as themselves (2015 SEA Games Singapore's wushu representatives)
- Eugene Teo and Ang An Jun as themselves (2015 SEA Games Singapore's water polo representatives)
- Chen Shucheng, Aileen Tan, Rayson Tan, Felicia Chin, Aloysius Pang as themselves portraying as Mediacorp artistes in the drama series Life - Fear Not
- Hao Hao as Xiao-qiang 小强, a hospital doctor

== Production ==
The storyboard for the series, Ang Eng Tee, said in an interview with My Paper that the show may need to be re-scripted even after the script for all 255 episodes has finished writing. This is because speculations that the general elections may be held in 2015 is trending, and that the political parties are already introducing its candidates progressively. If the elections are held in September, the show will need to re-insert the GE buzz, and the director and cast will need to do re-takes. The election dates were announced on 25 August, and the GE buzz was inserted on episode 225 (7 September 2015), where Dennis Chew and Sheila Sim mentioned the election campaigns. However, as the show was pre-empted six times during that period, episode 225 could have been aired on 28 August if there were no interruptions, causing the campaigning period, which were held on 2 to 9 September, to have happened earlier than usual.

== Original Sound Track (OST) ==
Song title	Song type	Lyrics	Composer	Arranger	Performer(s)	Producer(s)
够力够力	Theme Song	Jack Neo	Matthew Teng		Jack Neo	Paul Yuen, Mo Ju Li
118	Sub-theme Song 1	Le Sheng 乐声	Zheng Kai Hua		Chew Chor Meng, Chen Hanwei, Cavin Soh, Dennis Chew, Xu Bin, Ya Hui, Pan Lingling, Dawn Yeoh, Liu Lingling	Mo Ju Li
重来	Sub-theme Song 2	Le Sheng 乐声	Matthew Teng		Chew Chor Meng (unplugged); Cavin Soh (original)	Mo Ju Li
最美的旅行	Sub-theme Song 3	Le Sheng 乐声	Zheng Kai Hua		Ruth Kueo 魏妙如	Mo Ju Li
明信片	Sub-theme Song 4	Le Sheng 乐声	Matthew Teng		Wu Hui Bing 吴惠冰 (female); Matthew Teng (male)	Mo Ju Li
光辉岁月	Other songs	Wong Ka Kui	Wong Ka Kui	—N/a	Chew Chor Meng (unplugged); Beyond (original)	—N/a
你知道我的迷惘	Other songs	Lau Coek-fai	Wong Ka Kui	—N/a	Chew Chor Meng (unplugged); Beyond (original)	—N/a
喜欢你	Other songs	Liang Wern Fook		—N/a	Chew Chor Meng (ep 1 unplugged); Dennis Chew (Wang Shunfeng version); Kit Chan (original); Carrie Wong (Zhang Ke'ai version)	—N/a
关怀方式	Other songs	Hu Wen Long 胡文龙	Sui An 随安	—N/a	Chen Hanwei, Chua Lee Lian 蔡礼莲	—N/a
爱的路上千万里	Special song (ep 10, 11, 14, 62)	Sun Yi 孙仪	Liu Chia-chang	Matthew Teng	Huang Shi Qing 黄诗晴, Huang Jia Qi 黄嘉琪(Younger Jiejie and Meimei); Wu Hui Bing 吴惠冰, Ruth Kueo (Teenage Jiejie and Meimei); Liu Lingling, Carrie Wong (Jiejie and Ke'ai)	Mo Ju Li
等你等到我心痛	Other songs	Roy Li		—N/a	Roy Li (original)	—N/a
爱如潮水	Other songs	Roy Li		—N/a	Roy Li (unplugged) Jeff Chang (original)	—N/a
情非得已	Special song	Zhang Guo Xiang 张国祥	Jovi Theng	—N/a	Carrie Wong (Zhang Ke'ai version); Xu Bin (ep 69 unplugged); Dawn Yeoh (ep 93 unplugged)	—N/a
夜来香	Special song (ep 14, 33, 71-72)	Yao Min	Lee Jun Qing 李雋青	—N/a	Liu Lingling, Carrie Wong (ep 71/72 unplugged)	—N/a
我的心里没有他 (original title: Historia de un Amor)	Special song (ep 20)	Carlos Eleta Almaran; Chen Die Yi 陳蝶衣 (Chinese lyrics)	Carlos Eleta Almaran	—N/a	—N/a	—N/a
情人的眼泪	Special song (ep 20, 102)	Yao Min	Chen Die Yi 陳蝶衣	—N/a	Liu Lingling (unplugged)	—N/a
城里的月光	Special song (ep 32)	Chen Jiaming 陈佳明		—N/a	Mavis Hee (original)	—N/a
你是我的唯一	Special song (ep 45)	Heng Cheng Hwa 邢增华	Eric Moo	—N/a	Eric Moo (original)	—N/a
贺新年	CNY songs (ep 90)	严折西	李厚襄	—N/a	Women's team	—N/a
恭喜恭喜	CNY songs (ep 90)	Chen Gexin		—N/a	Men's team	—N/a
春风吻上我的脸	CNY songs (ep 90)	Chen Die Yi 陳蝶衣	Yao Min	—N/a	Women's team	—N/a
财神到	CNY songs (ep 90)	黄仁清		—N/a	Men's team	—N/a

== Awards and nominations ==
=== Star Awards 2016 ===
118 has the third-most number of nominations for Star Awards 2016, with 11 nominations in 10 award categories. The series has at least one nomination in every performance award for drama programmes.

The Star Awards are presented by Mediacorp.

Star Awards – Acting Awards
Accolades	Category	Nominees	Result
Star Awards	Best Set Design for Drama Programme	Ho Hock Choon	Won
Star Awards	Young Talent Award	Sun Yi En	Nominated
Star Awards	Best Theme Song (《够力够力》)	Jack Neo	Nominated
Star Awards	Best Supporting Actor	Chen Tianwen	Nominated
Star Awards	Best Supporting Actress	Carrie Wong	Nominated
Star Awards	Best Supporting Actress	Sheila Sim	Nominated
Star Awards	Best Actor	Chen Hanwei	Nominated
Star Awards	Best Actress	Ya Hui	Nominated
Star Awards	Best Drama Serial	—N/a	Nominated
Star Awards	Favourite Female Character	Hong Ling	Nominated
