= 118 II =

Singapore TV drama

- Also known as: Yeo Yeo Huat II
- Mandarin Chinese: 要要发 II
- Genre: Socio-drama; Dramedy; Family
- Written by: Ang Eng Tee
- Directed by: Lim Mee Na; Gao Xiu Hui; Khoo Khiang Ting; Foo Zhi Bing; Lin Mingzhe; Zhang Huiying
- Starring: Chew Chor Meng; Pan Lingling; Dennis Chew; Ya Hui; Xu Bin; Hong Ling; Jeanette Aw; Elvin Ng; Bryan Wong; Ha Yu
- Opening theme: 够力够力 by Jack Neo
- Ending theme: 1)干杯 by Cavin Soh & Roy Li; 2)最近 by Roy Li; 3)最最最好的 by Roy Li; 4)朦朦的 by Bonnie Loo & Roy Li; 5)够力够力 by Jack Neo; 6)等你等到我心痛 by Roy Li; 7)如果没遇见你 by Ya Hui
- Country of origin: Singapore
- Original languages: Mandarin, with some English dialogue
- No. of seasons: 2
- No. of episodes: 218

Production
- Executive producers: Soh Bee Lian; Wong Kuang Yong
- Running time: 22 minutes (without advertisements)
- Production company: Mediacorp

Original release
- Network: Mediacorp Channel 8
- Release: 29 November 2016 – 29 September 2017

Related
- 118 (2014 - 2015); 118 Reunion (2018)

118 II (Mandarin Chinese: 要要发 II) was a drama series produced by Mediacorp Channel 8. It stars Chew Chor Meng, Pan Lingling, Dennis Chew, Ya Hui, Xu Bin, Hong Ling, Jeanette Aw, Elvin Ng, Bryan Wong and Ha Yu as the cast of the second series.

The show replaced the second half of the 7:00 pm drama timeslot, airing weekdays at 7.30 pm to 8.00 pm from November 29, 2016, making it the fourth long form half an hour drama and the first drama having 2 seasons airing together with news-current affairs programme Hello Singapore at 6.30pm.

== Cast ==
=== Hong (Daming) Family ===
Cast	Role	Description
Chew Chor Meng 周初明	Hong Daming 洪达明	118, Fa-ge (发哥/明哥), Benjamin: Liu Meimei's husband; Hong Shunshui's father; Hong Jinzhi, Wang Shunfeng and Wang Yuye's foster father; Hong Shanshan's elder brother; Chen Meizhen's foster father-in-law; Lin Zhigao's best friend; Retired and handed over the coffeeshop to Shunfeng and Shunshui; Li Taimei's god father
Pan Lingling 潘玲玲	Liu Meimei 刘媚媚	Small Ang Mo Kio, Mrs 118, Aunt Fa (发嫂/明嫂): Hong Daming's wife; Hong Shunshui and Hong Jinzhi's mother; Wang Shunfeng and Wang Yuye's foster mother; Liu Jiejie's younger sister; Chen Meizhen's foster mother-in-law; Zhang Meiyou's ex-girlfriend; Li Taimei's small god-mother; Zhang Zhenhui's aunt
Dennis Chew 周崇庆	Wang Shunfeng 王顺风	Paul, Mr Wang (王先生), CEO (总裁): Hong Daming and Liu Meimei's foster son; Chen Meizhen's husband; Hong Jinzhi, Hong Shunshui's foster elder brother; Wang Yuye's biological elder brother; Hong Shanshan, Liu Jiejie's foster nephew; Yeo Yeo Huat coffeeshop's boss; Li Taimei's god elder brother; Qiu Jianguo's rival-in-love
Ya Hui 雅慧	Hong Jinzhi 洪金枝	Madam, Sister Wanton Mee (云吞面姐姐), Mummy Wanton Mee (云吞面妈咪), Princess of Wanton Mee (云吞面公主), Just-so-happens (恰恰好): Chen Meizhen's foster sister-in-law; Hong Daming's foster daughter; Zhang Meiyou and Liu Meimei's biological daughter; Hong Shunshui's half elder sister; Wang Shunfeng's foster younger sister; Wang Yuye's foster elder sister; Hong Shanshan's foster niece; Li Zhihao's girlfriend; Deng Bo's boss and love interest; Li Taimei's god younger sister; Liu Jiejie's niece; Zhang Zhenhui's cousin
Xu Bin 徐彬	Hong Shunshui 洪顺水	Stay-away-from-you (生人勿近), Boss: Chen Meizhen's foster brother-in-law cum enemy; Hong Daming and Liu Meimei's son; Hong Jinzhi's half younger brother; Wang Shunfeng's foster younger brother; Wang Yuye's foster elder brother; Hong Shanshan, Liu Jiejie's nephew; Zhang Ke'ai's boyfriend; Boris Seow's rival in love; Yeo Yeo Huat coffeeshop's boss; Xiao Dingdong's boss; Zhang Zhenhui's cousin
Hong Ling 洪凌	Wang Yuye 王玉叶	Main Villain of the series but repented in the end: Tang Yiyi's rival in love; Despise Tang Yiyi and Zhang Zhenhui; Liu Yazhou's girlfriend (later in the series break up); Constantly badmouthing Chen Meizhen and Zhang Ke'ai; Root cause of causing Liu Meimei and Chen Meizhen relationship to turn sour; Find trouble with Zhang Ke'ai
Sora Ma 马艺瑄	Chen Meizhen 陈美珍	Main Villain of the series but repented in the end: Wang Shunfeng's wife and ex-classmate; Qiu Jianguo's primary school friend and love interest

=== Zhang (Tiancheng) Family ===
Cast	Role	Description
Chen Tianwen 陈天文	Zhang Tiancheng 张天成	Villain but repented in the end Dang Dang (当当), Arrogant Chen (丫丫陈), Lucas, Robert: Liu Jiejie's husband; Zhang Zhenhui and Zhang Ke'ai's father; Liu Dagong's rival in love
Liu Lingling 刘玲玲	Liu Jiejie 刘洁洁	Big Ang Mo Kio, Sister Pizza (披萨姐), Fat Girl (肥妹): Zhang Tiancheng's wife; Liu Meimei's elder sister; Zhang Zhenhui's mother; Zhang Ke'ai, Hong Jinzhi and Hong Shunshui's aunt; Liu Dagong' ex-classmate and love interest; Li Taimei's big god-mother; Wang Shunfeng and Wang Yuye's foster aunt
Nick Teo 张奕恺	Zhang Zhenhui 张振辉	Dear (亲爱的), Muscleman (肌肉男): Zhang Tiancheng and Liu Jiejie's son; Zhang Ke'ai's half elder brother; Wang Yuye's ex-boyfriend; Liu Yazhou's rival in love; Tang Yiyi's boyfriend; Liu Meimei's nephew; Hong Jinzhi and Hong Shunshui's cousin
Carrie Wong 黄思恬	Zhang Ke'ai 张可爱	One-and-only (天下无双): Zhang Tiancheng's daughter; Zhang Zhenhui's half younger sister; Hong Shunshui's girlfriend; Boris Seow's love interest; Liu Jizhou's tenant

=== Li (Weiliang) Family ===
Cast	Role	Description
Chen Hanwei 陈汉玮	Li Weiliang 李伟良	Ah Niang/Ah Liang (阿娘/阿良) / Uncle Niang (Uncle娘) / Dumpling Niang (粽子娘), Alex Lee, Niangniang (娘娘), See-The-Play/ Sil-Te-Plait 屎大别: Hong Daming and Liu Meimei's friend & Brother-in-law; Hong Shanshan's husband; Pulled out of the new Yeo Yeo Huat's business; Li Tianfa's father
Sheila Sim 沈琳宸	Hong Shanshan 洪姗姗	Little Durian (小榴莲), Shan (姗): Hong Daming's younger sister; Liu Meimei's sister-in-law; Li Weiliang's wife; Hong Shunshui's aunt; Wang Shunfeng, Hong Jinzhi and Wang Yuye's adoptive aunt; Lin Zhigao's best and childhood friend; Li Tianfa's mother

=== Zhang (Meiyou) Family ===
Cast	Role	Description
Roy Li 黎沸挥	Zhang Meiyou 张没友	I'm-a-good-man (我是好人), Mr Zhang (张先生): Hong Daming's ex-enemy; Liu Meimei's ex-boyfriend; Hong Jinzhi's biological father; Hua Jie's husband; In love with Na Na; Liu Dali's rival in love; Yeo Yeo Huat coffeeshop's employee and chef
Cat Ang 翁慧霖	Sister Blossom 花姐	Zhang Meiyou's wife; Suffered from Dengue Fever in Episode 7; (Deceased - episode 17)

=== Li (Jinlong) Family ===
Cast	Role	Description
Ha Yu 夏雨	Li Jinlong 李金龙	Old Pop (老豆), Wimpy Long (软脚龙), Brother Long (龙哥), 2060: Shangguan Yan's husband; Li Taimei's father; Former Gangster and gang leader; Liu Jizhou's tenant and father-in-law; Returned to Hong Kong to assist in a police investigation in Episode 59; (Deceased in Episode 167)
Cassandra See 薛淑珊	Shangguan Yan 上官燕	Chilli Padi (小辣椒), Yan (阿燕), Old Swallow (老燕子): Li Jinlong's wife; Li Taimei's mother; Liu Jizhou's mother-in-law; Went back to Ipoh in episode 49; Went back to Singapore in episode 171
Jeanette Aw 欧萱	Li Taimei 李太美	Manman (慢慢), Female Assassin (女杀手), Sister (大嫂): Li Jinlong and Shangguan Yan's Daughter; Ex-Gangster; Martial art expert; Liu Jizhou's Tenant; Hong Daming, Liu Meimei and Liu Jiejie's god-daughter; Wang Shunfeng's god younger sister; Hong Jinzhi, Hong Shunshui and Wang Yuye's god older sister; Hong Tianpao's childhood friend and love interest; Liu Jizhou's wife (married in Episode 218); Liu Yazhou's sister-in-law

=== Liu (Dagong) Family ===
Cast	Role	Description
Zhu Houren 朱厚任	Liu Dagong 刘大功	Dua Gong, Alexander Lau, Old Liar/ Swinder (老骗子): Liu Dali's 2nd elder brother; Liu Jizhou, Liu Yazhou and Liu Junjie's paternal 2nd uncle; Liu Jiejie ex-classmate and love interest; Zhang Tiancheng's rival in love; Ah Feng's husband; Na Na's brother-in-law
Huang Jinrong 黄景蓉	Ah Feng 阿凤	Liu Dagong's wife; Liu Dali's sister-in-law; Dementia patient
Brandon Wong 黄炯耀	Liu Dali 刘大利	Dua Liap, Ernest Lau: Mentally Unstable; Liu Dagong's younger brother; Liu Jizhou and Liu Yazhou's paternal 3rd uncle; Ah Feng's brother-in-law; Na Na's husband; Liu Junjie's father; Zhang Meiyou's rival in love
Caryn Cheng 荘微霓	Na Na 娜娜	Liu Dali's Vietnamese wife; Liu Junjie's mother; Liu Dagong's sister-in-law; Zhang Meiyou's love interest
Bryan Wong 王禄江	Liu Jizhou 刘际洲	Property Agent; Chicken Congee (鸡粥), Soursop (红毛榴莲), Keep-Away-From-Him (闲人免进): Liu Yazhou's elder brother; Liu Dagong and Liu Dali's nephew; Hong Daming and Liu Meimei's neighbour; Hong Shunshui's best friend; Zhang Ke'ai, Li Jinlong and Li Taimei's tenant; Li Taimei's husband (married in Episode 218); Li Jinlong and Shangguan Yan's son-in-law; Liu Junjie's cousin
Jeremy Chan 田铭耀	Liu Yazhou 刘亚洲	Duck Porridge (鸭粥), Jerk (小混蛋), Greedy Monster (化骨龙), Asia Lau, Con Artist (骗子): Liu Jizhou's younger brother; Liu Dagong and Liu Dali's nephew; Tang Yiyi's ex-boyfriend; Wang Yuye's ex boyfriend; Zhang Zhenhui's rival in love; Liu Junjie's cousin; Li Taimei's brother-in-law
Perez Tay 郑传峻	Liu Junjie 刘俊杰	Ah Boy (阿Boy): Liu Dali and Na Na's son; Liu Dagong's nephew; Liu Jizhou and Liu Yazhou's cousin

=== Deng (Bo) Family ===
Cast	Role	Description
Elvin Ng 黄俊雄	Deng Bo 邓波	Terminator, Rambo (雷波), Hello Kukuti, Hello (哈咯), Bo-Bo (波波), 大番薯 (Potato): Deng Anqi's foster father; Hong Jinzhi's bodyguard; In love with Hong Jinzhi; Li Zhihao's rival in love
Toh Xin Hui 杜芯慧	Deng Anqi 邓安琪	Deng Bo's foster daughter; Martial art expert; Stay in United States

=== Other characters ===
Cast	Role	Description
Cavin Soh 苏梽诚	Lin Zhigao 林志高	Hong Daming's best friend
Ye Shipin 叶世品	Steven	Hong Daming's old neighbour and friend
Desmond Ng 黄振隆	Boris Xiao Bin 萧兵	Zhang Ke Ai's love interest Hong Shunshui's rival in love
Hayley Woo 胡佳嬑	Isabella Tang Yiyi 汤依依	A different role as compared to Vivian the Apple Pie (苹果派) from the prequel; Zhang Zhenhui's girlfriend; Liu Yazhou's rival-in-love
Zhang Yaodong 张耀栋	Wang Zhipeng 王志鹏	Lethal Weapon (轰天炮), Pao Pao (炮炮): Hong Kong gangster; Li Taimei's childhood friend; In love with Li Taimei; Liu Jizhou's rival-in-love
Tang Miaoling 汤妙玲	Bai Lanxiang 白兰香	Villain; Princess Xiangxiang (香香公主), Cheap (烂人), Toxic Lanxiang (恶毒兰香), Wretch (臭女人): Boss of a coffee stall at coffee shop; In love with Hong Daming; Liu Meimei's rival in love
Tay Yong Meng 郑荣铭	Peter	Hong Shunshui's good friend and ex-colleague at the car showroom; Shareholder of a second-hand car company
He Ying Ying 何盈莹	Xiao Dingdong 萧丁冬	Ding Ding (丁丁), Ding Dang (丁当), Little Muddledhead (小迷糊): Original name Xiao Yaxuan (萧亚轩); Came from Malacca, Malaysia; Yeo Yeo Huat kopitiam's employee
Grace Teo 张嘉轩	Zoe	Mystery Woman (神秘女人）: Frequent and demanding customer of Hong Jinzhi's wonton noodles; Li Zhihao's spy
Charles Lee 李家庆	Li Zhihao 李志浩	Richard, Rascal (臭小子): Original name Richard Lee; Hong Jinzhi's boyfriend; Zoe and Deng Bo's boss

=== Cameo appearances ===
Cast	Role	Description
Darryl Yong 杨子文	Ben Tong	Works in Tanglin Kopi tiam
Wee Soon Hui 黄孙慧	Tong Li Yan	Works in Tanglin Kopi tiam
Rahman Rahim	Zulkifli “Abang Zul”	Works in Tanglin Kopi tiam
Mickey Huang 黄子佼	Himself	Taiwanese comedian actor/celebrity; Came from Taiwan
Zen Chong 章证翔	Qiu Jianguo 邱建国	Villain: Lawyer; Chen Meizhen's primary school friend; In love with Chen Meizhen; Wang Shunfeng's primary school enemy and rival in love; Later becomes the Main Villain of 118 Reunion
Chen Xiang 陈翔	Mr Wang 王总	Villain; Old Turtle (老乌龟): Pervert; Billionnare; Liu Yazhou's main investor

== Original Sound Track (OST) ==
Song title	Song Type	Lyrics	Composer	Arranger	Performer(s)
够力够力	Theme song	Jack Neo	Matthew Teng		Jack Neo
朦朦的	Sub-theme song	Tah Kah Beng	Roy Li		Bonnie Loo; Roy Li
最近	Sub-theme song	Roy Li	Roy Li; Zheng Kaihua		Roy Li
最最最好的	Sub-theme song	Roy Li	Roy Li; Zheng Kaihua		Roy Li
干杯	Sub-theme song	Roy Li	Roy Li; Zheng Kaihua		Roy Li; Cavin Soh
如果没遇见你	Sub-theme song	Roy Li; Yolanda	Roy Li		Ya Hui
等你等到我心痛	Sub-theme song	Roy Li			

== Marketing ==
Various roadshows to promote the series were done country wide.

The first roadshow was held at Compass One on 19 November 2016 with artistes Chew Chor Meng, Pan Lingling, Elvin Ng, Ya Hui, Dennis Chew, Xu Bin, Sora Ma, Chen Tianwen, Zhu Houren, Brandon Wong and Jeanette Aw. A second roadshow was held at Bedok Point on 17 December 2016 with artistes Bryan Wong, Pan Lingling, Carrie Wong, Zhang Yaodong, Dennis Chew, Hong Ling, Sheila Sim, Nick Teo, Li Feihui, Cavin Soh and Liu Lingling.

The third roadshow was held at Bishan Junction 8 on 19 February 2017 with artist Ya Hui, Carrie Wong, Hayley Woo, Hong Ling, Pan Lingling, Sheila Sim, Chew Chor Meng, Elvin Ng, Brandon Wong, Zhu Houren and Bryan Wong with Bishan North Minister Mrs Josephine Teo. The fourth roadshow was held at OneKM Mall on 29 April 2017 with artist Bryan Wong, Carrie Wong, Desmond Ng and Brandon Wong. The fifth roadshow was held at OneKM Mall on 30 April 2017 with artists Pan Lingling, Chen Tianwen, Elvin Ng, Ya Hui, Hong Ling, Nick Teo, Sora Ma and Jeremy Chan.

== Awards and nominations ==
Year	Ceremony	Nominees	Category	Result	Ref
2018	Star Awards	He Yingying	Best Newcomer	Nominated	
2018	Star Awards	Sheila Sim	Best Supporting Actress	Nominated	
