= Sheila Sim (Singaporean actress) =

Singaporean actress and model (born 1984)

- Born: Sheila Sim Hui Yi; 7 June 1984 (age 41); Singapore
- Education: Radin Mas Primary School; CHIJ Saint Theresa's Convent; Nanyang Polytechnic; Marketing Institute of Singapore; School of Positive Psychology
- Alma mater: Curtin Singapore
- Occupations: Actress; model; businesswoman
- Years active: 2001−present
- Agent: AGNT
- Spouse: Deon Woo (m. 2018)
- Children: 2
- Awards: Star Awards 2018: Top 10 Most Popular Female Artistes

Stage name
- Traditional Chinese: 沈琳宸
- Simplified Chinese: 沈琳宸
- Hanyu Pinyin: Shěn Línchén

Birth name
- Traditional Chinese: 沈惠怡
- Simplified Chinese: 沈惠怡
- Hanyu Pinyin: Shěn Huìyí

Sheila Sim Hui Yi (born 7 June 1984) is a Singaporean actress, model and businesswoman.

== Early life and education ==
Sim attended Radin Mas Primary School and CHIJ Saint Theresa's Convent. She later studied at Nanyang Polytechnic but dropped out after three months. Sim graduated from Marketing Institute of Singapore with a diploma in sales and marketing and Curtin Singapore with a degree in advertising and marketing respectively. In 2021, Sim graduated from with a diploma in positive psychology from the School of Positive Psychology.

== Career ==
Sim started modelling in 2001. She was discovered at 16 by a talent scout while attending the wedding of her aunt Ivy Chng, who was a runway model in the 1980s. In 2009, Sim made her film debut in indie film Autumn In March, and later in 2013, she made her television debut in Channel 8's Chinese drama series, I'm in Charge.

In 2014, Sim filmed a toggle original series, Mystic Whisper and a long-running half hour drama, 118 that earned her first nominatation for Best Supporting Actress and Top 10 Most Popular Female Artistes in Star Awards 2016. In 2016, she made cameo appearances in The Queen and You Can Be an Angel 2. She also filmed The Dream Job, Hero and 118 II, which earned her second acting nomination for Best Supporting Actress in Star Awards 2018. She participated in dramas 118 Reunion, Eat Already? 4 and Reach For The Skies, and toggle original series, VIC and a Singapore-Hong Kong collaboration drama, Blue Tick.

Sim won her first Star Awards for Top 10 Most Popular Female Artistes in 2018 on her third nomination.

== Business venture ==
In September 2013, Sim started a modelling agency, NU Models, with singer Olinda Cho.

== Personal life ==
In 2016, Sim changed her Chinese name from 沈惠怡 (Shěn Huìyí) to 沈琳宸 (Shěn Línchén), upon the advice of a Fengshui master.

In January 2018, Sim announced that she married a banker named Deon Woo. They have two daughters: Layla Woo, born on 22 September 2020, and Skyla Woo, born on 7 February 2023.

== Filmography ==
=== Television series ===
Year	Title	Role	Notes	Ref
2013	I'm in Charge	Wang Xiaohui		
2013	Disclosed	Maggie Qiu		
2014	Mystic Whispers (听)	Mo Xiaoyun		
2014	118	Hong Shanshan		
2015	You Can Be an Angel Too	Liu Youle		
2015	Love? (限量爱情)	Sheila Chan		
2015	Project W (W计划)	Wynn		
2016	The Queen	Guan Ying		
2016	The Dream Job	Chen Yiqing		
2016	You Can Be an Angel 2	Liu Youle		
2016	Hero	Fan Fangfang		
2016	118 II	Hong Shanshan		
2017	My Friends From Afar	Alien Queen		
2018	118 Reunion (118大团圆)	Hong Shanshan		
2018	Eat Already? 4	Cheryl		
2018	Reach For The Skies	Lin Feina		
2018	VIC	Shen Bingbing		
2018	Blue Tick (以读不回)	Peng Xiyu		
2019	How Are You?	He Qingqing		
2019	All Is Well (你那边怎样，我这边OK)	Ye Jiaxin		
2019	Day Break (天空渐渐亮)	Wen Shuying		
2020	How Are You? 2 (好世谋2)	He Qingqing		
2021	Live Your Dreams (大大的梦想)	Zhu Zhixin		
2021	The Heartland Hero (邻里帮)	Weng Qiuling	Cameo	
2025	Emerald Hill - The Little Nyonya Story (小娘惹之翡翠山)	Zhang Yin Niang		

=== Film ===
Year	Title	Role	Notes	Ref
2009	Autumn In March	Xinjie		
2019	The Play Book (爱本)	Chen Yuqi		
2022	Geylang	Celine		

== Awards and nominations ==
Organisation	Year	Category	Nominated work	Result	Ref
Star Awards	2016	Best Supporting Actress	118 (as Hong Shanshan)	Nominated	
Star Awards	2016	Top 10 Most Popular Female Artistes	—	Nominated	
Star Awards	2017	Top 10 Most Popular Female Artistes	—	Nominated	
Star Awards	2018	Top 10 Most Popular Female Artistes	—	Won	
Star Awards	2018	Best Supporting Actress	118 II (as Hong Shanshan)	Nominated	
Star Awards	2019	Top 10 Most Popular Female Artistes	—	Nominated	
Star Awards	2019	Best Supporting Actress	Eat Already? 4 (as Cheryl)	Nominated	
Star Awards	2022	Top 10 Most Popular Female Artistes	—	Nominated	
