= Zheng Geping =

Singaporean actor and producer (born 1964)

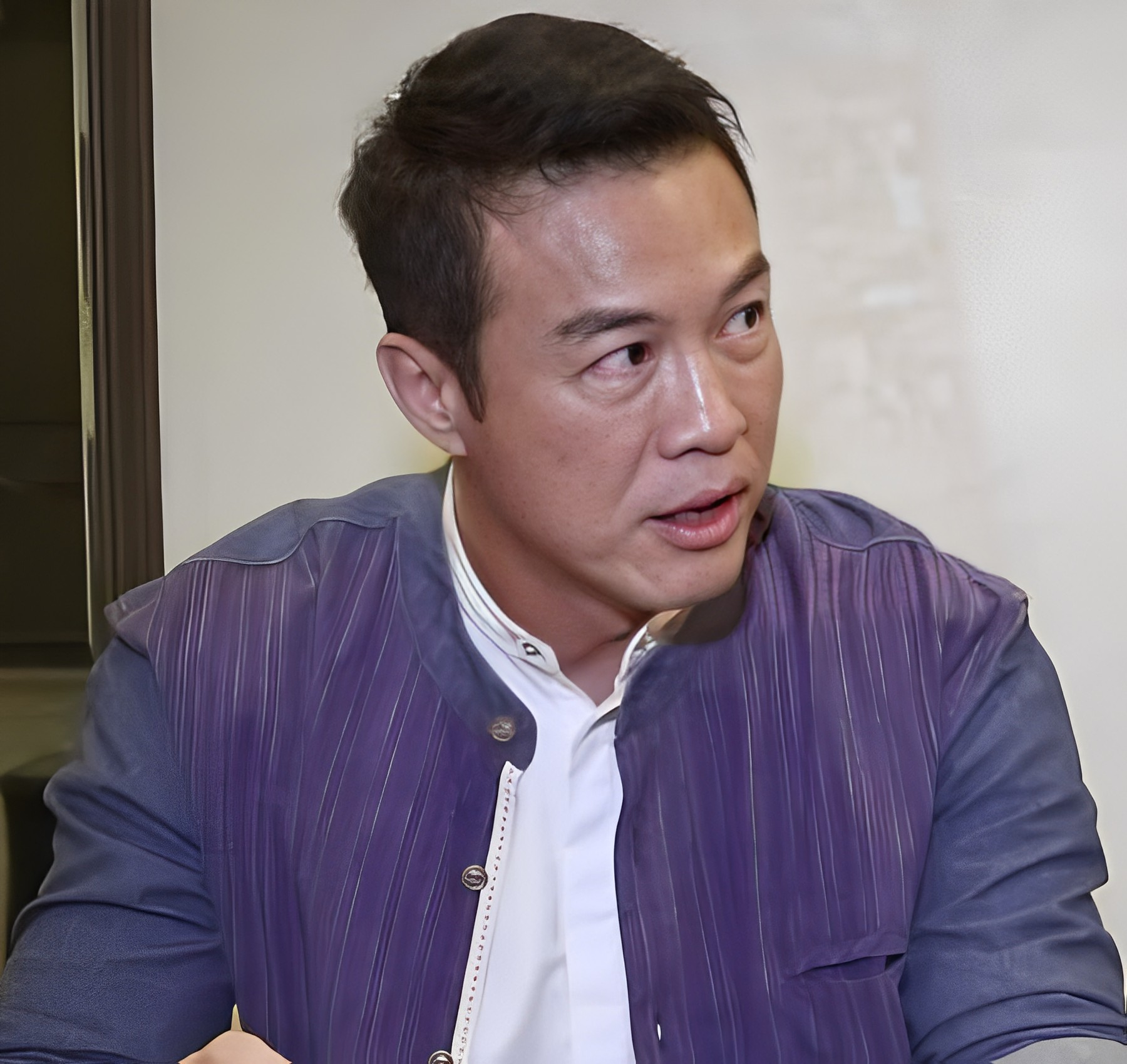
- Zheng in 2017
- Born: Edmund Tay Kok Peng; 27 May 1964 (age 62); Singapore
- Occupations: Actor; executive producer; businessman
- Years active: 1987-present
- Spouse: Hong Huifang (m. 1992)
- Children: Tay Ying; Calvert Tay
- Awards: Full list

Stage name
- Traditional Chinese: 鄭各評
- Simplified Chinese: 郑各评
- Hanyu Pinyin: Zhèng Gèpíng

Birth name
- Traditional Chinese: 鄭國平
- Simplified Chinese: 郑国平
- Hanyu Pinyin: Zhèng Guópíng

Zheng Geping (born Edmund Tay Kok Peng, 27 May 1964), formerly known as Zheng Guoping, is a Singaporean actor, executive producer and businessman. He has appeared in several Mediacorp Channel 8 television series. He left Mediacorp in 2023 as a full-time artiste.

== Career ==
Zheng, a former chef and taekwondo instructor, became a full-time actor in 1987 after completing SBC's 7th Professional Drama Performers' Training Course, and had been given mostly supporting roles. His hard work finally paid off at the Star Awards 2007 ceremony when he won the Best Actor award for his role in Like Father, Like Daughter. After his Best Actor win in 2007, Zheng's popularity rose when he won the Top 10 Most Popular Male Artistes award for the years 2009-2013. He bared his body at the age of 47, putting most men to shame with his solid six pack. Zheng became the brand ambassador of hair consulting company in June 2013. In August 2013, Zheng released a health and fitness book, Star Fitness.

On 1 February 2023, Zheng resigned from Mediacorp as a full-time artiste.

== Personal life ==
Zheng is married to Mediacorp artiste Hong Huifang. They have a daughter and a son, Tay Ying and Calvert Tay respectively, who also joined the local media scene.

Zheng was awarded the Pingat Bakti Masyarakat in 2025.

== Filmography ==
=== Television series ===
Year	Title	Role	Notes	Ref.
1992	Modern Romance 男欢女爱	Zhuang Zhiqiang		
1998	Airforce	Zhao Feiying		
2010	Precious Babes	Fu Weiming		
2010	Unriddle	Shan Fan / Savage		
2010	Mrs P.I.	Zhang Haowei		
2010	Breakout	Tang Yaozu		
2011	Kampong Ties	Zeng Youbao		
2011	Code of Honour	Yuan Zhenfei		
2012	Joys of Life	Qian Caifa		
2012	Poetic Justice	David		
2012	It Takes Two	Ah Pao		
2013	Sudden	Zhong Zhenlie		
2014	C.L.I.F. 3	Zhang Yuanyao		
2014	World at Your Feet	Gao Shou		
2014	Against The Tide	Qiu Gangyi		
2014	The Journey: Tumultuous Times	Liang Sihai		
2015	You Can Be an Angel Too	Huang Yiqiang		
2015	Hand In Hand	Chen Haonan		
2015	Life - Fear Not	Shenlong		
2016	You Can Be an Angel 2	Huang Yiqiang		
2016	Hero	Bonnie's father		
2017	The Lead	Fang Guodong		
2017	When Duty Calls	Yang Yongzheng		
2017	Eat Already? 3	Zeng Gaoli		
2017	Eat Already? 3	Zeng Gaowei		
2018	Fifty & Fabulous 五零高手	Ma Kelong		
2018	Close Your Eyes (闭上眼就看不见)	—N/a	As executive producer	
2019	C.L.I.F 5: Honour Of Sea (警徽天职5之海岸卫队)	Zheng Jiancheng		
2019	How Are You?	—N/a	As executive producer	
2019	The Good Fight (致胜出击)	—N/a	As executive producer	
2020	How Are You? 2 (好世谋 2)	—N/a	As executive producer	
2021	My Star Bride	Ouyang Long		
2021	Key Witness (关键证人)	Xu Yaokang		
2021	The Heartland Hero	Herman		
2021	Leave No Soul Behind (21点灵)	Li Changcai		
2022	First of April (愚人计划)	—N/a	As executive producer	
2022	I Want to Be A Towkay (亲家、冤家做头家)	—N/a	As executive producer	
2022	Soul Detective	—N/a	As executive producer	

=== Film ===
Year	Title	Role	Notes	Ref.
2011	It's a Great, Great World	Ghost train operator	Special appearance	
2011	The Ultimate Winner	Datuk Ong		
2012	Dance Dance Dragon		Special appearance	
2014	re: solve (决义案)	Tang Wenzhang		
2015	7 Letters	Son	Segment "GPS (Grandma Positioning System)"	
2017	The Fortune Handbook	Competition judge	Special appearance	
2019	When Ghost Meets Zombie	Gym Trainer		
2022	Deleted	Chia Zhongyi	Also as executive producer	
2024	Money No Enough 3			

== Discography ==
=== Compilation albums ===
Year	English title	Mandarin title
2012	MediaCorp Music Lunar New Year Album 12	新传媒群星金龙接财神
2013	MediaCorp Music Lunar New Year Album 13	新传媒群星金蛇献祥福

== Awards and nominations ==
Organisation	Award	Category	Nominated work	Result	Ref
Star Awards	1996	Best Supporting Actor	Tofu Street	Nominated	
Star Awards	1998	Best Supporting Actor	Return of the Condor Heroes (as Jinlu Fawang)	Nominated	
Star Awards	1999	Best Supporting Actor	Wok of Life (as Huang Xiaodong)	Nominated	
Star Awards	2000	Best Supporting Actor	The Legendary Swordsman (as Yue Buqun)	Nominated	
Star Awards	2006	Best Supporting Actor	The Shining Star (as Huang Feilong)	Nominated	
Star Awards	2007	Best Actor	Like Father, Like Daughter (as Dai Zhigang)	Won	
Star Awards	2009	Top 10 Most Popular Male Artistes	—N/a	Won	
Star Awards	2010	Best Supporting Actor	Together (as Qin Xianglan)	Nominated	
Star Awards	2010	Top 10 Most Popular Male Artistes	—N/a	Won	
Star Awards	2011	Top 10 Most Popular Male Artistes	—N/a	Won	
Star Awards	2012	Best Actor	Kampong Ties (as Zeng Youbao)	Nominated	
Star Awards	2012	Top 10 Most Popular Male Artistes	—N/a	Won	
Star Awards	2013	Top 10 Most Popular Male Artistes	—N/a	Won	
Star Awards	2014	Top 10 Most Popular Male Artistes	—N/a	Won	
Star Awards	2014	Most Popular Regional Artiste (Cambodia)	—N/a	Nominated	
Star Awards	2015	Top 10 Most Popular Male Artistes	—N/a	Nominated	
Star Awards	2016	Top 10 Most Popular Male Artistes	—N/a	Won	
Star Awards	2018	Top 10 Most Popular Male Artistes	—N/a	Won	
Star Awards	2019	Top 10 Most Popular Male Artistes	—N/a	Won	
Star Awards	2021	Top 10 Most Popular Male Artistes	—N/a	Won	
Star Awards	2022	All-Time Favourite Artiste	—N/a	Won	
Madrid International Film Festival 2022	2022	Outstanding Leading Actor	Deleted (as Chia Zhongyi)	Won	
