= Hey Gorgeous season 2 =

Hey Gorgeous
- Season 2
- Native name: 校园美魔王
- Hosted by: Dasmond Koh; Ben Yeo
- Judges: Dai Xiangyu; Rebecca Lim; Zhang Zhenhuan
- Winner: Alfred Low
- Runners-up: Carrie Wong; Richie Koh

Release
- Original network: MediaCorp Channel U
- Original release: 27 May – 15 July 2013

Season chronology
- Next → Season 3

The second season of Hey Gorgeous (Chinese: 校园美魔王; pinyin: Xiàoyuán Měi Mówáng), a Singaporean talent-scouting competition which searches for new talents in tertiary institutes, premiered on 27 May 2013 on MediaCorp Channel U. In this season, there are 24 number of semifinalists, while there are 12 number of finalists. This season launched artistes like Carrie Wong, Somaline Ang & Richie Koh to fame. Alfred Low was crowned winner of this season.

== Judges and hosts ==
Dasmond Koh and Ben Yeo return again from season 1 as hosts for this season. During the finals, Dai Xiangyu, Rebecca Lim and Zhang Zhenhuan form the judging panel.

== Semifinalists ==
Colour key

- Winner
- Runner-up
- Eliminated during the semifinals

== Elimination chart ==
Result details

- Winner
- Runner-up
- Contestant was eliminated

Contestant	Semifinals	Grand Finals
Alfred Low	Advanced	Winner
Carrie Wong	Advanced	Runner-up
Richie Koh	Advanced	Runner-up
Somaline Ang	Advanced	Top 12
Chase Tan	Advanced	Top 12
	Advanced	Top 12
	Advanced	Top 12
	Advanced	Top 12
	Advanced	Top 12
	Advanced	Top 12
	Advanced	Top 12
	Advanced	Top 12
