= Edwin Goh =

Singaporean actor (born 1994)

- Born: 25 July 1994 (age 32); Singapore
- Education: Holy Innocents' High School; LASALLE College of the Arts
- Occupations: Actor; businessman
- Years active: 2009-present
- Awards: Full list

Chinese name
- Traditional Chinese: 吳勁威
- Simplified Chinese: 吴劲威
- Hanyu Pinyin: Wú Jìnwēi

Edwin Goh (born 25 July 1994) is a Singaporean actor.

== Early life ==
Goh was a student of Holy Innocents' High School and LASALLE College of the Arts.

== Career ==
Goh was nominated for Favourite Male Character. He gained his first nomination for Top 10 Most Popular Male Artistes & Most Popular Regional Artiste Award . In 2013, he was nominated for Best Newcomer. In 2015, Goh went for National Service for the Singapore Armed Forces after filming The Dream Makers II. He was nominated for Best Supporting Actor at Star Awards 2016.

Goh made his acting debut at the age of 15 in MediaCorp Channel 5's drama Fighting Spiders in 2009. He shot to fame after starring as the estranged and rebellious teenage son of Li Nanxing's character in the crime drama On the Fringe 2011.

In 2018, he completed his National Service for the Singapore Armed Forces and came back to act A Million Dollar Dream, Fifty & Fabulous & You Can Be An Angel 3 and also a toggle original series Close Your Eyes.

In 2019, Goh acted in a long form drama Old is Gold and The Good Fight. In 2020, he acted in My Guardian Angels.

In 2021, he acted in My Star Bride and The Peculiar Pawnbroker and earned a nomination for Top 10 Most Popular Male Artistes.

In 2022, Goh played two roles in the drama Home Again as Ye Jiankang and Ye Kangle and in When Duty Calls 2 as Wu Guanyan.

In 2023, Goh played the role of Liu Guanghui in the drama Strike Gold.

== Ventures ==
In 2023, Goh and actress Rachel Wan launched the brand Unravel & which sells their own handcrafted crocheted collection of hats and bags. They have also conducted crocheting workshops under the brand name.

== Personal life ==
On 7 September 2022, Goh was on his way home from a bar near Golden Mile area in the early morning when he was stopped along Aljunied Road by the traffic police. He was later arrested for drink driving after failing a breathalyser test. He was subsequently fined $6,500 and disqualified from driving for three years.

Since July 2023, Goh and his girlfriend Rachel Wan have been based in Sydney, Australia, where both are on a one-year work and holiday visa.

== Filmography ==
=== Television series ===
Year	Title	Role	Notes	Ref.
2009	Fighting Spiders	Soon Lee		
2011	On the Fringe 2011	Yao Zhiyong		
2012	Jump!	Chen Xi		
2012	Don't Stop Believin'	Cai Wensheng		
2013	Gonna Make It	Li Feilong		
2014	C.L.I.F. 3	Young Wei Lantian		
2014	The Caregivers	Wei Lun		
2015	The Dream Makers II	Eddy Xu		
2016	C.L.I.F. 4	Young Wei Lantian		
2018	A Million Dollar Dream	Zhang Yizheng		
2018	Fifty & Fabulous (五零高手)	Ye Yunfeng		
2018	Close Your Eyes (闭上眼就看不见)	Liao Zhiyuan	Toggle Original Series	
2018	You Can Be An Angel 3 (你也可以是天使 3)	Yuan Kai		
2019	Soul Connection (爱在一百米)	Delivery Man		
2019	Old Is Gold (老友万岁)	Han Xiangrong		
2019	The Intruder	Thomas		
2019	Meet The MP	Robert		
2019	The Good Fight (致胜出击)	Yan Yifeng		
2020	My Guardian Angels	Feng Kaiwei		
2021	My Star Bride	Zhong Shimin		
2021	The Peculiar Pawnbroker (人心鉴定师)	Teenage Cheng Huoqiang		
2022	Home Again (多年后的全家福)	Ye Jiankang		
2022	Home Again (多年后的全家福)	Ye Kangle		
2022	When Duty Calls 2 (卫国先锋2)	Wu Guangyan		
2023	Strike Gold	Liu Guanghui		
2023	All That Glitters	Arthur Thng		

=== Film ===
Year	Title	Role	Notes	Ref.
2010	Love Cuts	Howard Chan		
2012	Imperfect	He Jianhao		
2013	Judgement Day	Liu Mingkai		
2019	Old Is Gold: The Bliss Keeper (老友万岁之守护幸福)	Han Xiangrong	Telemovie	
2022	My Star Bride - Hi, Mai Phương Thảo	Zhong Shimin	Telemovie	

== Discography ==
=== Compilation albums ===
Year	English title	Mandarin title
2012	MediaCorp Music Lunar New Year Album 12	新传媒群星金龙接财神
2018	MediaCorp Music Lunar New Year Album 18	新传媒群星阿狗狗过好年
2019	MediaCorp Music Lunar New Year Album 19	新传媒群星猪饱饱欢乐迎肥年
2020	MediaCorp Music Lunar New Year Album 20	裕鼠鼠纳福迎春了

== Awards and nominations ==
Year	Ceremony	Category	Nominated work	Result	Ref
2011	—N/a	红苹果 in Ch8 Facebook Poll	—N/a	Won	
2012	Elle Awards 12	Breakout Star of the Year	—N/a	Won	
2012	Star Awards	Favourite Male Character	On The Fringe (as Yao Zhiyong)	Nominated	
2013	Star Awards	Best Newcomer	Don't Stop Believin' (as Cai Wensheng)	Nominated	
2014	Star Awards	Top 10 Most Popular Male Artistes	—N/a	Nominated	
2014	Star Awards	Star Awards for Most Popular Regional Artiste (Indonesia)	—N/a	Nominated	
2016	Star Awards	Best Supporting Actor	The Dream Makers II (as Eddy Xu)	Nominated	
2016	Fame Awards 2016	Best Actor In A Supporting Role	The Dream Makers II (as Eddy Xu)	Nominated	
2021	Star Awards	Top 10 Most Popular Male Artistes	—N/a	Nominated	
2023	Star Awards	Top 10 Most Popular Male Artistes	—N/a	Nominated	
