= Zhai Siming =

Chinese actor and model

- Born: Hebei, China
- Education: Orchid Park Secondary School; Temasek Polytechnic
- Occupations: Actor; model; TikTok personality
- Years active: 2014−present
- Musical career
- Member of: HST
- Modeling information
- Hair color: Black
- Eye color: Black

Chinese name
- Traditional Chinese: 翟思銘
- Simplified Chinese: 翟思铭
- Hanyu Pinyin: Zhái Sīmíng

Zhai Siming is a Chinese actor, model and TikTok personality based in Singapore. He is the finalist of Star Search 2019.

== Life and career ==
Born in Hebei, China, and the only child of a single-parent family, Zhai moved to Singapore with his mother, at the age of seven. Zhai's mother has since relocated to Maryland, U.S. for her beauty business, when he was 19. She had initially planned for Zhai to join her after he completed his studies in Singapore, but his participation in the Star Search 2019 competition changed the plans.

Growing up attending local schools, Zhai has been a basketball enthusiast since he was young. At the age of 17, while studying in Secondary 5 at Orchid Park Secondary School, he successfully auditioned for a role in the 2014 basketball film Meeting the Giant, which was directed by Tay Ping Hui and produced by Zhu Houren.

At 1.87m tall, Zhai is formerly a part-time model and an engineering student at Temasek Polytechnic. He began modelling after he was scouted for Hey Gorgeous (Season 3) in 2015. Zhai has also acted in many small part roles on television and worked numerous part-time jobs, including selling ice cream door-to-door, waiting for jobs at banquets, and working in retail, prior to joining Star Search in 2019, where he was one of the top 12 contestants at the finals. In an interview, Zhai named Taiwanese actor Eddie Peng as one of his "biggest inspirations" as he admired Peng's determination and passion in his numerous action movies.

In 2021, Zhai, Herman Keh, and Tyler Ten were teamed up as the group "HST" by Mediacorp's artiste management arm, The Celebrity Agency. The trio were previously signed to the same modelling agency and had known each other before joining the Star Search competition.

Zhai is also a TikTok personality who has accumulated more than 115K followers and 1.3 million "likes" to date.

== Filmography ==
=== Television series ===
Year	Title	Role	Notes	Ref
2015	The Dream Makers II			
2018	A Lonely Fish (寂寞鱼。听见)	Jayden		
2018	Say Cheese	Brandon		
2018	Close your Eyes (闭上眼睛看不见)			
2019	Muay Thai Girl			
2019	All Around You (回路网)	Zack Lee		
2020	Super Dad (男神不败)	Beck		
2021	The Peculiar Pawnbroker (人心鉴定师)	Hao Haoren		
2021	Key Witness (关键证人)	Quan Shengxian		
2021	CTRL	Huang Yiming		
2021	The Heartland Hero	Kim Woo Min	Guest appearance	
2021	Soul Old Yet So Young (心里住着老灵魂)	Wei		
2022	Healing Heroes (医生不是神)	Kelun		
2022	Soul Doctor (灵医)	Benson		
2022	First of April (愚人计划)			
2022	Genie in a Cup (哇到宝)	Ma Yingwei		
2022	Love at First Bite (遇见你真香)	Zi Xuan		
2023	Fix My Life	Weng Jianhao		
2023	My One and Only	Ma Zhongyi		
TBA	Hungry Souls (味尽缘)			

=== Film ===
Year	Title	Role	Notes
2014	Meeting the Giant	Jiangyi	

=== Variety show ===
Year	English title	Mandarin title	Notes
2021	#JustSwipeLah	刷一刷	Co-host

== Discography ==
=== Compilation albums ===
Year	English title	Mandarin title	Ref
2021	MediaCorp Music Lunar New Year Album 21	新传媒群星福满牛年Moo Moo 乐	
2022	MediaCorp Music Lunar New Year Album 22	新传媒群星旺虎泰哥迎春乐	

== Awards and nominations ==
Year	Award	Category	Nominated work	Result	Ref
2015	—N/a	—N/a	Hey! Gorgeous	Top 20	
2022	Asian Television Awards	Best Actor in a Supporting Role	Genie in a Cup	Nominated	
2023	Star Awards	Top 10 Most Popular Male Artistes	—N/a	Nominated	
2024	Star Awards	Top 10 Most Popular Male Artistes	—N/a	Nominated	
2025	Star Awards	Top 10 Most Popular Male Artistes	—N/a	Nominated	
