= My Guardian Angels =

- 单翼天使
- Genre: Drama
- Written by: Chwee Chwee Goh; Yeow Tang
- Directed by: Martin Chan; Max Lim
- Starring: Zoe Tay; Kym Ng; Hong Ling; Pierre Png
- Country of origin: Singapore
- Original language: Mandarin
- No. of episodes: 30

Production
- Producer: Bee Lian Teng

Original release
- Network: Mediacorp Channel 8
- Release: 6 April – 15 May 2020

My Guardian Angels (Chinese: 单翼天使) is a Singaporean drama produced and telecast on Mediacorp's Channel 8. It stars Zoe Tay, Kym Ng, Hong Ling, and Pierre Png. The series has received criticism for its portrayal of LGBTQ characters.

The series was the most-watched local Chinese drama series in Singapore in 2020. For her role in the drama, Tay won the Star Awards for Best Actress.

== Cast ==
=== Main ===
- Zoe Tay as Mandy See

The matriarch of a rich household who lost her husband and fortune and left with two daughters to care for. She seems arrogant and stuck-up, but was still a good natured person. She gradually fell for Su Dong Yu despite fearing him due to his volatile temper and his conviction for manslaughter

- Kym Ng as Wu Miaomiao

A private taxi driver and mother of three sons

- Hong Ling as Ye Si Jin

A single mother with a young son who had ADHD

- Pierre Png as Su Dong Yu

An ex-convict who served seven years in prison for manslaughter, and the flatmate of Mandy and her daughters. He gradually fell in love with Mandy despite their initial rocky relationship.

=== Supporting ===
- Edwin Goh as Feng Kaiwei

Si Jin's boyfriend and the biological father of their son

- Benjamin Tan as Tang Guiqiang

The eldest son of Miao Miao and You Nian, and later the boyfriend of Jelyn

- Chen Tianwen
- Fang Rong as Jelyn Seah Ying

The elder daughter of Mandy and later the girlfriend of Guiqiang, whom she later marries and had a child together

- Jin Yinji

The mother-in-law of Miao Miao and You Nian's mother

- Brandon Wong as Tang You Nian

Miao Miao's neglectful husband who often went to work overseas

- Ivan Lo Kai Jun as Tang Gui De

The second son of Miao Miao and You Nian. He was sexually assaulted by his basketball coach

- Chen Junhe as Tang Gui Yong

The youngest son of Miao Miao and You Nian. He had a love for cooking

- Sliver Ang as Gu Jiaqi

Dong Yu's ex-girlfriend and pianist. Seven years ago, Dong Yu caught her having an affair with his best friend Lin Yijie, and in a fit of rage, Dong Yu wounded Jiaqi and caused her to go blind, while Yijie died of serious injuries in the same attack, which caused Dong Yu to be incarcerated many years ago. Jiaqi maintains her feelings of hatred towards Dong Yu for killing Yijie and causing her to lose her eyesight

- Jaymeson Olivero as Lin Yijie

Dong Yu's best friend. He was killed by an enraged Dong Yu after he was caught having an affair with Dong Yu's girlfriend Jiaqi.

- Lynn Lim

=== Guest and minor ===
- Peter Yu as Xie Zhihong

Mandy's husband who died early in the series

- Regene Lim
- Liang Tian
- Natalie Mae Tan as Aelyn Seah Ning

The younger daughter of Mandy, and the younger sister of Jelyn

- Chase Tan as Bai Shan De

Gui De's basketball coach who was a paedophile and sexually assaulted Gui De and many other young boys. His crimes were eventually exposed and he was sent to prison.

- Hazelle Teo
- Marcus Mok
- Cassandra See
- Joy Yak
- Bernard Tan as Mr. Chen
- Adele Wong
- Wallace Ang

== Controversy ==
A sub-plot involving a paedophilic gay basketball coach who had a sexually transmitted disease portrayed by Chase Tan was criticised by the LGBT community in Singapore for perpetuating the stereotype that gay men are paedophiles and have sexually transmitted diseases. The sub-plot was condemned by Action For Aids, a Singaporean non-governmental organisation "dedicated to fighting HIV/AIDS infection", who stated that "The portrayal of gay men as paedophiles further perpetuates falsehoods that create further suffering among an already marginalised and stigmatised population." A second sub-plot involving parents, portrayed by Kym Ng and Brandon Wong, worrying about the sexual orientation of their son, portrayed by Benjamin Tan, and behaving in a homophobic manner, was also criticised.

In response to the criticism, Mediacorp issued an apology, stating that it had "no intention to disrespect or discriminate against the LGBTQ community in the drama". A spokesperson for the company stated that the first sub-plot was meant to "encourage young people to be aware of potential dangers and not be afraid to speak up and protect themselves", and that the second sub-plot was meant to " depict the real life struggles some parents face in communicating with their children on topics such as relationships and sexual orientation".
