= FCSS =

FCSS may refer to:

- Fidelity China Special Situations, LSE stock symbol FCSS
- Fuchun Secondary School, a secondary school in Woodlands, Singapore
