= Benjamin Tan =

Singaporean actor (born 1993)

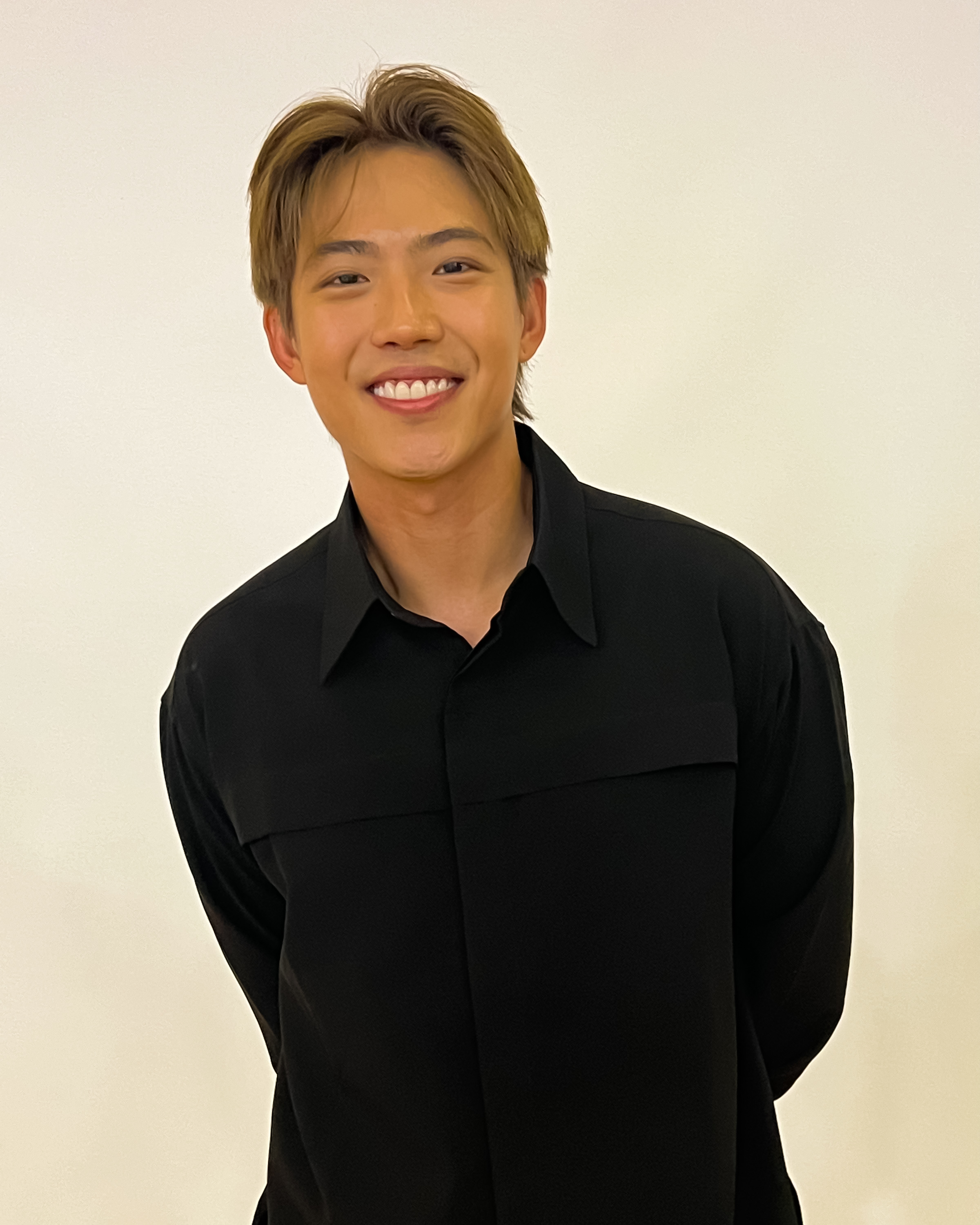
- Tan in 2024
- Born: 27 March 1993 (age 33); Singapore
- Occupation: Actor
- Years active: 2019−present

Chinese name
- Traditional Chinese: 陳豐諺
- Simplified Chinese: 陈丰谚
- Hanyu Pinyin: Chén FēngYàn

Benjamin Tan (born 27 March 1993) is a Singaporean actor known for his minor roles in the television dramas My Guardian Angels, Mister Flower, When Duty Calls 2, Soul Doctor, The Heartland Hero, Emerald Hill High and Strike Gold.

== Education ==
Tan graduated from Murdoch University in 2018 with Bachelor of Communications.

== Career ==
Tan has been signed to Mediacorp since May 2019.

Tan appeared in Emerald Hill High and played as a slow-learner ah beng in Lion Mums 3 in 2019, and played a slow-witted young man in the long-form series The Heartland Hero in 2021.

He appeared in When Duty Calls 2 in 2022.

He starred in the television drama series Strike Gold.

In 2024, Tan won his first Star Awards for Top 10 Most Popular Male Artistes, though he conceded to creating 10 accounts to vote for himself.

In 2024, he held his first-ever TGIF Music Session with the Singapore Chinese Cultural Centre on 6 December 2024.

== Personal life ==
Tan is the only child of his family and they run a curtains and blinds business. His father is semi-retired.

On 16 April 2022, Tan revealed that his mother, an office worker, had died after being in a coma for near to 2 years. She was 53.

=== Controversies ===
On 13 October 2022, Tan wrote a lengthy post on his public Instagram account where he voiced his displeasure about an unnamed colleague who also appeared in the 2023 drama series Strike Gold. Tan described the person as "kinda disrespectful to [the] crew and the production as a whole." Tan further claimed that the individual was "almost always late for shoots, and never apologetic for their tardiness." Tan also hinted at the individual's identity, saying that the individual has taken on a smaller role compared with their past projects.

In an interview with Lianhe Zaobao on 10 January 2023, Tan admitted that the strongly-worded Instagram post had caused trouble for the Strike Gold crew as well as "affected innocent people". However, Tan insisted that it was "right to point out the problems" and further hinted that the person he was targeting at was not present at Strike Gold's media press conference. AsiaOne went on to report that artistes who attended the conference were Desmond Tan, He YingYing, Yao Wenlong, Yvonne Lim (who attended virtually), Jin Yinji, Kiki Lim, Hong Huifang and Jeffrey Xu.

Furthermore, after bagging his Top 10 Most Popular Artist, he openly admitted that he created 10 accounts to vote for himself, amassing over 100 votes per day.

== Filmography ==
=== Television series ===
Year	Title	Role	Notes	Ref.
2019	Emerald Hill High	Ron Koh		
2019	Lion Moms 3	Spencer Sng		
2019	Tribes	Spencer Sng		
2020	Mister Flower	Sherman Lee		
2020	My Guardian Angels	Tang Guiqiang		
2021	Key Witness	Ash		
2021	Mr Zhou's Ghost Stories@Job Haunting	Gary		
2021	The Heartland Hero	Jeremy		
2021	The Takedown	Ryan		
2021	Why? Victor	Victor		
2021	Leave No Soul Behind	Wu Baiqiang	Cameo	
2022	Soul Doctor	Wu Baiqiang		
2022	When Duty Calls 2	Goh Zhuixiang		
2023	Strike Gold	Joshua		
2023	Oppa, Saranghae!	Young Liang Zixuan		
2023	Shero	Joel Seah	Cameo	
2023	Stranger in the Dark	Lin Zhichuan		
2024	Furever Yours 宠他，还是爱我？	Young Xie Zi Guang		
2024	Unforgivable 不可饶恕的罪恶	Soul		
2024	The Blockbusters 巨舞霸	Lance		
2025	Devil Behind The Gate 庭外的一角	Andy Du		
2025	Oh My Goodness 霸总爱上我的妈	Zhang Jun Hao 张俊浩		
2025	Perfectly Imperfect 活出好命来	Dai Gong Gong 戴公公		

== Awards and nominations ==
Year	Award	Category	Nominated work	Result	Ref.
2021	Star Awards	Best Newcomer	My Guardian Angels	Nominated	
2023	Star Awards	Top 3 Most Popular Rising Stars	—N/a	Nominated	
2024	Star Awards	Top 10 Most Popular Male Artistes	—N/a	Won	
2025	Star Awards	Top 10 Most Popular Male Artistes	—N/a	Won	
