= Mr Zhou's Ghost Stories@Job Haunting =

2021-2023 Singaporean television series

- Promotional poster
- Traditional Chinese: 周公講鬼@行行都撞鬼
- Simplified Chinese: 周公讲鬼@行行都撞鬼
- Literal meaning: "Supernatural encounters in every occupation"
- Hanyu Pinyin: Zhōu gōng jiǎng guǐ@háng háng dōu zhuàng guǐ
- Genre: Horror; Drama; Mystery
- Screenplay by: Situ Bi
- Directed by: Qiu Jianting
- Starring: Dennis Chew
- Country of origin: Singapore
- Original language: Mandarin
- No. of seasons: 3
- No. of episodes: 30

Production
- Executive producer: Wu Yulin
- Cinematography: Zheng Qingshan
- Editor: Li Minghui
- Running time: 17~20 minutes

Original release
- Network: Channel 8
- Release: 2021 – 2023

Related
- Mr Zhou's Ghost Stories @ Singapore Sightings

Mr Zhou's Ghost Stories@Job Haunting (Chinese: 周公讲鬼@行行都撞鬼) is a Singaporean supernatural drama series starring Dennis Chew. A dramatisation of the stories shared on the Love 97.2FM deejay's popular radio segment of the same name, the series premiered on meWATCH in 2021. A second season was available on meWATCH in 2022 and subsequently aired on Channel 8 in 2023 and a third season was available on meWATCH in 2024 and subsequently aired on Channel 8 in 2024.

It won Best Short-form Drama Serial at the Star Awards 2022.

== Cast ==
Radio deejay Dennis Chew appears as himself (Mr Zhou) in every episode in all 3 Seasons.

=== Season 1 ===
No.	Title	Cast
1	"1st Job Haunt: Food Deliveryman"	Benjamin Tan as Gary; Lina Tan as Lina
2	"2nd Job Haunt: Security Guard"	Benjamin Tan as Gary; Chen Tianwen as Heng; Gini Chang as Woman; Desmond Ng as Oh
3	"3rd Job Haunt: Renovator"	Desmond Ng as Oh; Cavin Soh as Seng; Chen Tianwen as Heng; Gini Chang as Woman; Teo Boon Seng as Mr Lim
4	"4th Job Haunt: Karung Guni"	Cavin Soh as Seng; Herman Keh as Tony; Zhu Xiufeng as Elderly woman
5	"5th Job Haunt: Property Agent"	Herman Keh as Tony; Ho Ai Ling as Tina; Lin Weisheng as Ben
6	"6th Job Haunt: Actor"	Nick Teo as Aiden; Ho Ai Ling as Tina
7	"7th Job Haunt: Marathon Runner"	Nick Teo as Aiden; Jernelle Oh as Eileen; Zhu Xiufeng as Elderly woman
8	"8th Job Haunt: Private Hire Car Driver"	Nick Teo as Aiden; Jernelle Oh as Eileen; Ian Fang as Sebastian; Lawrence Wong as Lawrence
9	"9th Job Haunt: Photographer"	Ian Fang as Sebastian; Benjamin Tan as Gary
10	"10th Job Haunt: DJ (Finale)"	Benjamin Tan as Gary; Gini Chang as Woman; Chen Tianwen as Heng; Desmond Ng as Oh; Cavin Soh as Seng; Jernelle Oh as Eileen; Ho Ai Ling as Tina; Teo Boon Seng as Mr Lim; Lawrence Wong as Lawrence

=== Season 2 ===
No.	Title	Cast
1	"Chapter 1：Escape from Calamity"	Zhu Xiufeng as Granny Gong; JJ Neo as Ling Xuan; Richie Koh as Dr. Fang; Lina Tan as Lina
2	"Chapter 2：Convenience Store Worker"	Hazelle Teo as Hazel; Jeremy Chan as Oscar; Richie Koh as Dr. Fang; Lin Weide as Psychiatrist
3	"Chapter 3：Second-Hand Car Dealer"	Jeremy Chan as Oscar; JJ Neo as Ling Xuan; Tyler Ten as Sean; Joshua Tan as Ah Qiang
4	"Chapter 4：Lawyer"	Tyler Ten as Sean; JJ Neo as Ling Xuan; Jeremy Chan as Oscar; Zong Zijie as Teck
5	"Chapter 5：Joss Paper Craftsman"	Zong Zijie as Teck; Rayson Tan as Fortune-teller An; Zhou Quanxi as Boss
6	"Chapter 6：Fortune-Teller"	Rayson Tan as Fortune-teller An; JJ Neo as Ling Xuan; Richard Low as Luo; Zhu Xiufeng as Granny Gong
7	"Chapter 7：Hawker"	Richard Low as Luo; Zhang Wei as Yan; Richard Low as Luo; Feng Kaiyi as Emily
8	"Chapter 8：Student"	Seow Sin Nee as Selina; Feng Kaiyi as Emily; Eelyn Kok as Ms. Ko
9	"Chapter 9：Influencer"	Seow Sin Nee as Selina; Xuan Ong as Steffi; Lai Hongen as Stan
10	"Chapter 10：Good Fortune Awaits (Finale)"	Lina Tan as Lina; Ian Fang as Sebastian; Zhu Xiufeng as Granny Gong

=== Season 3 ===
No.	Title	Cast
1	"Chapter 1：Are you sure they are Human Beings?"	Mark Lee as himself; Marcus Chin as himself
2	"Chapter 2: Flight Attendant"	Bonnie Loo as Gwen; Romeo Tan as Hendrix; Joel Choo as Leo; Kiki Lim as Jernell
3	"Chapter 3 : Bartender"	Romeo Tan as Hendrix; Ye Jiayun as Renee; Zhai Siming as Owen
4	"Chapter 4 : Police Officer"	Romeo Tan as Hendrix; Ye Jiayun as Renee; Zhai Siming as Owen; Yao Wenlong as Lao Liang; Bryan Wong as Robert; Zhong Weiquan as Sunny; Ben Yeo as Xiao Tian
5	"Chapter 5 : Swimming Coach"	Bryan Wong as Robert; Zhong Weiquan as Sunny; Lu Linxuan as Ah Tan
6	"Chapter 6 : Undertaker"	Lu Linxuan as Ah Tan; Gao Meigui as Erin; Ben Yeo as Xiao Tian
7	"Chapter 7 : Bus Driver"	Ben Yeo as Xiao Tian; Cai Peishan as Meizhen; Huang Jiaqiang as Lao Song
8	"Chapter 8 : Maid"	Ben Yeo as Xiao Tian; Lina as Shan Shan; Cai Peishan as Meizhen; Yulan as Anna; Joel Choo as Leo
9	"Chapter 9 : Idol Singer"	Joel Choo as Leo; Bonnie Loo as Gwen; Romeo Tan as Hendrix
10	"Chapter 10 : Social Worker (Finale)"	Gao Meigui as Erin; Zhong Weiquan as Sunny; Marcus Chin as himself

== Accolades ==
Year	Ceremony	Category	Nominees	Result	Ref
2022	Star Awards	Best Short-form Drama Serial	—N/a	Won	
2023	ContentAsia Awards	Best Short-form Drama Series Made in Asia	Mr Zhou's Ghost Stories@Job Haunting II	Nominated	
2023	ContentAsia Awards	Best Sound Design for an Asian TV Programme/Series	Mr Zhou's Ghost Stories@Job Haunting II	Nominated	
