= Fly Entertainment =

Singapore-based entertainment agency

FLY Entertainment
- Type: Private
- Industry: Entertainment
- Founded: 1999
- Founder: Irene Ang
- Headquarters: Singapore
- Area served: Asia
- Key people: Irene Ang (Founder and CEO)
- Services: Artiste Management; Events Management; Marketing; Public Relations; Casting
- Subsidiaries: Running Into The Sun; Fly Academy; Fry Bistro; Bar Naked
- Website: fly.com.sg

FLY Entertainment (Chinese:飞艺娱乐) is a Singapore-based entertainment agency, specialising in services for the entertainment industry in Singapore and the region. Divisions include Artiste Management, Event Management and Marketing & Public Relations, in addition to several fully owned subsidiaries.

== History ==
FLY Entertainment was founded in 1999 by Singaporean host and comedian, Irene Ang.

FLY started a concert arm, Running Into The Sun, after a suggestion by Beatrice Chia-Richmond, who was managed by FLY at that time.

In 2013, FLY collaborated with JM Artiste Network to manage the cast of Ah Boys to Men. JM Artiste Network will handle the artistes' work in media while FLY will be handling their social engagements.

== Artistes managed ==
- Beatrice Chia-Richmond
- Chua Enlai
- Allan Wu
- Adrian Pang
- Narelle Kheng
- Constance Lau, Singaporean actress and model
- Tan Kheng Hua
