= Hey Gorgeous =

- 校园美魔王
- Genre: Reality television
- Presented by: Dasmond Koh (Season 1-3); Ben Yeo (Season 1-3); Fiona Xie (Season 1); Vivian Lai (Season 3); Kate Pang (Season 3)
- Judges: Dai Xiangyu (Season 2); Rebecca Lim (Season 2); Zhang Zhenhuan (Season 2); Sheila Sim (Season 3); Xu Bin (Season 3); Kym Ng (Season 3)
- Voices of: Lin Decheng (Season 3)
- Country of origin: Singapore
- Original language: Chinese
- No. of seasons: 3

Production
- Production location: Singapore
- Running time: 45 minutes

Original release
- Network: MediaCorp Channel U (Season 1-2); MediaCorp Channel 8 (Season 3)
- Release: 27 August 2007 – 26 October 2015

Related
- School Belle and the Beau (流星花园)

Hey Gorgeous (Chinese: 校园美魔王; pinyin: Xiàoyuán Měi Mówáng, previously styled Hey! Gorgeous, Chinese: 校花校草追赶跑; pinyin: Xiàohuā xiàocǎo zhuī gǎn pǎo) is a Singaporean talent-scouting competition which searches for new talents in tertiary institutes. The show ran for three seasons, with a change in its Chinese title during the second season. A similar contest was held in 2009, although it was not broadcast on television.

== History ==
Hey! Gorgeous was preceded by a talent-scouting competition entitled School Belle and the Beau (流星花园), which only aired on MediaCorp Channel 8 for one season in 2004. That season was hosted by Dennis Chew and Belinda Lee, and spawned artists such as Elvin Ng to fame. It took its current name when it was broadcast on MediaCorp Channel U in 2007. Two years later, in 2009 a similar competition, entitled Hey Gorgeous Online (校花校草上网追赶跑), was carried out in a wider variety of schools, and was hosted by YES 933 DJs. Public voting was carried out through voting online at the Hey Gorgeous website.

After a four-year hiatus, in 2013 there is a slight change to the format, as well as its Chinese name (校园美魔王). The second season launched artistes like Carrie Wong, Somaline Ang & Richie Koh to fame and the third season launched artistes like He Yingying to fame. Other artistes like Chase Tan and Zhai SiMing joined this competition in second season and third season respectively prior to their debut in the entertainment industry as well.

== Judges and hosts ==
Dasmond Koh and Ben Yeo serve as the hosts for all seasons. Fiona Xie was one of the main hosts for the first season, but did not appear in subsequent seasons after leaving MediaCorp. During the second season, other artists such as Shane Pow and Romeo Tan join them during the campus searches. In the third season, Vivian Lai and Kate Pang joined as main hosts.

During the finals of the second season, Dai Xiangyu, Rebecca Lim and Zhang Zhenhuan formed the judging panel.

Sheila Sim, Xu Bin and Kym Ng served as judges during the semifinals of the third season.

== Format ==
In all seasons, the first few episodes involve a campus search in which the hosts travel to various tertiary institutions and look out for good-looking students. In the first season, contestants were grouped according to their genders and schools, and they had to put up performances.

Since Season 2, the contestants are to participate in certain games in order to win points. Contestants are awarded based on their overall performances, and the top few from each school would then move on to the semi-finals. The semi-finalists would then undergo a bootcamp where they try out outdoor activities, where they would be judged by special local artistes. During the finals, the finalists have to show their Emotional Quotient (EQ), fashion sense, and wit that would by judged by public votes.

== Criticism ==
The second season was criticised to have bent ethics by having a lecturer divulging her students' particulars and administrative headshots to the hosts, as well as having the lecturer making calls to her student to be on the show.

== Series overview ==
Season	Start Date	End Date	Winner	Runner(s)-up	Main Hosts	Guest Hosts	Guest Judges	Sponsors
1	27 August 2007	12 November 2007	Lloyd Soon (Male); Peggy Chang (Female)		Dasmond Koh; Ben Yeo; Fiona Xie	Kym Ng		
2	27 May 2013	15 July 2013	Alfred Low	Carrie Wong; Richie Koh	Dasmond Koh; Ben Yeo	Shane Pow; Romeo Tan	Dai Xiangyu; Rebecca Lim; Zhang Zhenhuan	SILKYGIRL
3	24 August 2015	26 October 2015	Gan Zhi Jian	He Yingying; Lim Jing Yu	Dasmond Koh; Ben Yeo; Vivian Lai; Kate Pang		Sheila Sim; Xu Bin; Kym Ng	Pokka; London Choco Roll
