= Hey Gorgeous season 3 =

Hey Gorgeous
- Season 3
- Native name: 校园美魔王
- Hosted by: Dasmond Koh; Ben Yeo; Vivian Lai; Kate Pang
- Judges: Sheila Sim; Xu Bin; Kym Ng
- Winner: Gan Zhi Jian
- Runners-up: He Ying Ying; Lim Jing Yu
- Finals venue: MediaCorp TV Theatre
- No. of episodes: 9

Release
- Original network: MediaCorp Channel 8
- Original release: 24 August – 26 October 2015

Season chronology
- ← Previous; Season 2

The third season of Hey Gorgeous (Chinese: 校园美魔王; pinyin: Xiàoyuán Měi Mówáng), a Singaporean talent-scouting competition which searches for new talents in tertiary institutes, premiered on 24 August 2015 on MediaCorp Channel 8, and broadcast on Mondays from 8pm to 9pm. This season marks the first time the contest is aired on MediaCorp Channel 8, instead of MediaCorp Channel U in which the first two seasons were aired. In this season, the number of semifinalists has been downsized from 24 to 21, while the number of finalists has been downsized from 12 to eight. A total of seven tertiary institutions participate in this contest, namely Singapore Polytechnic, Temasek Polytechnic, Nanyang Polytechnic, Ngee Ann Polytechnic, National University of Singapore, Republic Polytechnic and Nanyang Academy of Fine Arts. Elvin Ng and Carrie Wong serve as the celebrity ambassadors for this season. Gan Zhi Jian from Singapore Polytechnic was crowned winner of this season. This season launched artist like He Yingying to fame.

== Judges and hosts ==
Dasmond Koh and Ben Yeo return as hosts for this season. This time round, they are joined by Vivian Lai and Kate Pang. During the semifinals, Sheila Sim, Xu Bin and Kym Ng form the judging panel.

== Semifinalists ==
Colour key

- Winner
- Runner-up
- Eliminated during the semifinals

Aloysius Tham 谭浩翔; 17, Republic Polytechnic	Alyssa Ho 何芝宁; 18, Republic Polytechnic	Beatrice Ng Hui Xian 黄慧贤; 19, Ngee Ann Polytechnic	Chen Guan Hong 陈冠宏; 16, Nanyang Academy of Fine Arts
Crystal Lee Mei Sian 李美娴; 18, Temasek Polytechnic	Edward Lim Jun Heng 林隽恒; 20, Nanyang Polytechnic	Fong Xiang Qi, Noreen 冯湘棋; 20, National University of Singapore	Gan Zhi Jian 颜志健; 20, Singapore Polytechnic
Goh Pei Xuan 吴佩璇; 17, Ngee Ann Polytechnic	He Yingying 何盈莹; 20, National University of Singapore	Jeng Chang Yu Chuan 张瑜娟; 20, Republic Polytechnic	Joel Thow 陶华翔; 18, Nanyang Polytechnic
Lim Jing Yu 林敬宇; 18, Nanyang Polytechnic	Natasha Nadya; 19, Nanyang Academy of Fine Arts	Ong Zi Xuan 王姿璇; 18, Nanyang Academy of Fine Arts	Sean Robert 辛恩; 17, Singapore Polytechnic
Tan Yun Pin 陈韵嫔; 19, Ngee Ann Polytechnic	Terence Tang 邓思源; 18, Singapore Polytechnic	Wu Ai 巫爱; 22, National University of Singapore	Zhai Siming 翟思铭; 19, Temasek Polytechnic

== Campus Search ==
In the first seven episodes, the hosts select good-looking students from each campus. Six of them are selected, and are treated to challenging games. The contestants are given points based on their overall performances. The contestant with the highest initial score advanced to the semifinals, together with two contestants who receive an extra of 10 points from the hosts. If a total of extra 20 points is given to a contestant, then the one with the second highest initial score will also advance to the semifinals.

Contestant awarded extra points
Contestant with highest remaining score
Contestant with second highest remaining score

=== Episode 1 (24 August, Singapore Polytechnic) ===
This episode was filmed on 2 July, and aired on 24 August.

Name	Age	Initial Score	Extra Points	Final Score
Kaela Chua 蔡欣芮	19	6	-	6
Sean Robert Den Hartog 辛恩	17	8	-	8
Pearlyn Chua 蔡咏莹	18	7.5	-	7.5
Terence Tang 邓思源	18	7	+10	17
Gan Zhi Jian 颜志健	20	9.5	+10	19.5
Melanie Wu 伍偲绮	18	5.2	-	5.2

=== Episode 2 (31 August, Temasek Polytechnic) ===
This episode was filmed on 15 July, and aired on 31 August.

Name	Age	Initial Score	Extra Points	Final Score
Charmaine Tan 陈俐僡	19	4	-	4
Jiang Qing Rong 蒋庆融	19	4	-	4
Rayner Lim 林佳陞	18	8.5	-	8.5
Zhai Si Ming 翟思铭	19	8.5	+10	18.5
Chanel Soh 苏暄喧^{1}	17	3.8	+10	13.8
Crystal Lee 李美娴	18	9.5	-	9.5

^1 Soh was unable to attend the semifinals for personal reasons.

=== Episode 3 (7 September, Nanyang Polytechnic) ===
This episode was filmed on 29 July, and aired on 7 September.

Name	Age	Initial Score	Extra Points	Final Score
Edward Lim 林隽恒	20	6	+10	16
Andre Ng 黄敬伟	20	7.8	-	7.8
Joel Thow 陶华翔	18	8.3	-	8.3
Lim Xiao Hui 林晓慧	19	7.5	-	7.5
Lim Jing Yu 林敬宇	18	6.5	+10	16.5
Christine Gan 颜柏霜	18	6	-	6

=== Episode 4 (14 September, Ngee Ann Polytechnic) ===
This episode was filmed on 5 August, and aired on 14 September.

Name	Age	Initial Score	Extra Points	Final Score
Damien Lim 林俊	17	8	-	8
Goh Pei Xuan 吴佩璇	17	9	-	9
Richard Wang 黄志成	19	5.9	-	5.9
Wendy Zhang 张耘迪	18	6	-	6
Tan Yun Pin 陈韵嫔	20	6.3	+10	16.3
Beatrice Ng 黄慧贤	19	7.5	+10	17.5

=== Episode 5 (21 September, National University of Singapore) ===
This episode was filmed on 13 August, and aired on 21 September.

Name	Age	Initial Score	Extra Points	Final Score
He Ying Ying 何盈莹	20	5.8	+10	15.8
Terence Tan 陈振辉	22	7.7	-	7.7
Chua Ying Jia 蔡颖嘉	19	6.2	-	6.2
Pan Yuan Yuan 潘媛媛	21	8.1	-	8.1
Noreen Fong 冯湘棋	20	9.6	-	9.6
Wu Ai 巫爱	22	8.1	+10	18.1

=== Episode 6 (28 September, Republic Polytechnic) ===
This episode was filmed on 18 August, and aired on 28 September.

Name	Age	Initial Score	Extra Points	Final Score
Alyssa Ho 何芝宁	18	7.8	-	7.8
Jeng Chang 张瑜娟	20	8.0	-	8.0
Aloysius Tham 谭浩翔	17	7.3	+20	27.3
Claudia Chau 周晓彤	19	6.2	-	6.2
Megan Yong 杨蕙镁	19	7.5	-	7.5
Amos Teng 唐文俊	19	6.5	-	6.5

=== Episode 7 (5 October, Nanyang Academy of Fine Arts) ===
This episode was filmed on 19 August, and aired on 5 October.

Name	Age	Initial Score	Extra Points	Final Score
Abigail Hu 胡含	19	6.8	-	6.8
Vanessa Tiara Tay 郑雅文	18	8.3	-	8.3
Ong Zi Xuan 王姿璇	18	9	-	9
Chen Guan Hong 陈冠宏	16	8	+10	18
Joelynn Wong 黄欣怡	21	7.8	-	7.8
Natasha Nadya	19	7.7	+10	17.7

== Semifinals ==
During the semifinals, the semifinalists travel to Clubmed Bintan on a 3-day-2-night bootcamp, where they are divided into three teams, and go through three rounds of outdoor activities and games to test their wits. Afterwards, each group has to do a fashion photoshoot where they are photographed by renowned photographers and are photographed individually and as a group. 12 students will be eliminated and 8 will advance to the finals. Sheila Sim, Xu Bin and Kym Ng serve as the guest judges for the semifinals. Episode 7 was broadcast on 12 October while Episode 8 was broadcast on 19 October.

=== Teams ===
Team	Red	Yellow	Green ^{2,} ^{3}
Contestants	Beatrice Ng; Tan Yun Pin; Lim Jing Yu; Noreen Fong; Aloysius Tham; Jeng Chang; Gan Zhi Jian	Alyssa Ho; Sean Robert; Joel Thow; Goh Pei Xuan; Natasha Nadya; Wu Ai; Crystal Lee	Edward Lim; He Ying Ying; Zhai Si Ming; Ong Zi Xuan; Terence Tang; Chen Guan Hong

=== Game results ===
Game	Points earned by team		
Game	Red	Yellow	Green
Jump and Snap	10	30	20
Working As One	20	10	30
Row, Row, Row Your Boat	10 _{(with Kym Ng)}	60 _{(with Sheila Sim)}	30 _{(with Xu Bin)}
Total	40	100	80

^2 Host Vivian Lai played as back-up for the team in "Jump and Snap" and "Working As One".

^3 Host Kate Pang played as back-up for the team in "Row, Row, Row Your Boat".

== Grand Finals ==
The grand finals was broadcast live on 26 October at 8 pm, and was held at the MediaCorp TV Theatre. The finalists have to show their EQ, fashion sense and wit through a series of performances and questions. Winners will be chosen 100% by public voting. Meanwhile, the London Choco Roll Most Charming Smile Award is given to the finalist who displays the best smile, and is also chosen through public voting. Elvin Ng and Carrie Wong are the guest stars during the finals, and they performed "满满的幸福", theme song of Channel 8 drama Sealed with a Kiss. In this season, Gan Zhi Jian was crowned winner while Hor Ying Ying received the London Choco Roll Most Charming Smile Award.

=== Talent Show ===
In this segment, each finalist has to put up a dance performance to showcase their talent.

Name	Order	Performance item	Status
Gan Zhi Jian 颜志健	1	Blend of wushu and hip-hop	Winner
Crystal Lee 李美娴	2	Dance to Taylor Swift's "Shake It Off"	
Lim Jing Yu 林敬宇	3	Dance to Shigga Shay's "Shigga Morning"	Runner-up
Noreen Fong 冯湘棋	4	Dance to Jessie J, Ariana Grande and Nicki Minaj's "Bang Bang"	
Sean Robert Den Hartog 辛恩	5	Homage to James Bond	
Hor Ying Ying 何盈莹	6	Ballet-like performance	Runner-up and London Choco Roll's Most Charming Smile Award winner
Edward Lim 林隽恒	7	Dance to Aaron Kwok's "对你爱不完"	
Chen Guan Hong 陈冠宏	8	Dance to Beyoncé's "Partition"	

== Elimination chart ==
Result details

- Winner
- Runner-up
- Contestant was eliminated

Contestant	Semifinals	Grand Finals
Gan Zhi Jian	Advanced	Winner
Lim Jing Yu	Advanced	Runner-up
He Ying Ying	Advanced	Runner-up
Chen Guan Hong	Advanced	Top 8
Crystal Lee	Advanced	Top 8
Edward Lim	Advanced	Top 8
Noreen Fong	Advanced	Top 8
Sean Robert	Advanced	Top 8
Aloysius Tham	Eliminated	
Alyssa Ho	Eliminated	
Beatrice Ng	Eliminated	
Goh Pei Xuan	Eliminated	
Jeng Chang	Eliminated	
Joel Thow	Eliminated	
Natasha Nadya	Eliminated	
Ong Zi Xuan	Eliminated	
Tan Yun Pin	Eliminated	
Terence Tang	Eliminated	
Wu Ai	Eliminated	
Zhai SiMing	Eliminated	
