= Lion Mums 2 =

- Genre: Drama
- Directed by: Yeo Lay Har
- Starring: Bernice Liu; Lina Ng; Nurul Aini; Vanessa Vanderstraaten
- Opening theme: Feels like Flying by Heterogenius
- Country of origin: Singapore
- Original language: English
- No. of seasons: 4
- No. of episodes: 30

Production
- Executive producers: Jean Yeo; Pedro Tan
- Production locations: Qifa Primary School; East Spring Primary School
- Running time: approx. 45 minutes per episode

Original release
- Network: Mediacorp Channel 5
- Release: 9 August – 28 September 2017

Related
- Lion Mums (2015); Lion Mums 3 (2019); Lion Mums 4 (2021)

Lion Mums 2 is a Singaporean drama produced by Mediacorp. Lion Mums 2 aired on Mediacorp Channel 5 from 9 August 2017 to 28 September 2017, Mondays to Thursdays from 10:00pm to 11:00pm. The debut episode aired on 9 August 2017 from 9:30pm to 10:30pm. It stars Bernice Liu, Lina Ng, Nurul Aini and Vanessa Vanderstraaten.

== Cast ==
=== Main Casts ===
Cast	Role
Bernice Liu	Jennifer Tan
Lina Ng	Chae Lian
Nurul Aini	Durrani Mazlan
Vanessa Vanderstraaten	Ho Min-Yi

=== Supporting Casts ===
Cast	Role
Joshua Tan	Marcus Lim/Kai's Father
Narain	Suresh
Fir Rahman	Reza Ali
Max Loong	Richard Lee
Gerald Chew	Eddie Ho/Min Yi's Father
Sue Tan	Emmy/Min Yi's Mother
Esther Low	Seraphina
KayLi Lum	Principal Koh
Caryn Cheng	Cheryl Sim
Scott C. Hillyard	Jeremy Lee
Alexandra Ling Hwei Tan	Ada Lee
Dayang Nurbalqis	Nabilah Reza
Siti Nur A’isha	Aqilah Reza
Keller Teh	Ho Kai
Ian Teng	Winston Lian
Matthew Loo	Jason Wee
Skylar Wong	Margaret Lian
Victoria Lim	Hillary Lian
Aadhya Anand	Sushila Chandran
Ethan Ng	Cristiano
Drake Lim	Coach Li
Lynette Lim	Hot Girl

== Trivia ==
- This is Lina Ng's first English drama series.
