= 夜桜 =

夜桜 or 夜樱 is a Chinese character for a word that means cherry blossom at night.

It may refer to:

Japan

- A Japanese surname in the manga Mission: Yozakura Family
- Yozakura (literally "night sakura"), the Hanami called at night

Singapore

- Last Madame: Sisters of the Night, 2023 Singaporean drama series
