= How Are You? (TV series) =

Singaporean television series

- Also known as: Ho Seh Bo 好勢嘸
- 好世谋
- Genre: Family; Silver Generation
- Written by: Lau Ching Poon 刘清盆
- Directed by: Png Keh Hock 方傢福; Lin Ming Zhe 林明哲
- Starring: Michelle Yim; Zhu Houren; Chen Liping; Romeo Tan; Sheila Sim; Ya Hui; Desmond Ng; Joshua Tan; Richard Low; Roy Li; Cynthia Koh
- Opening theme: Ho Seh Bo 好势呒 by Roy Li 黎沸挥
- Ending theme: 每天为你唱歌 by Desmond Ng 黄振隆 & Bonnie Loo 罗美仪
- Country of origin: Singapore
- Original languages: Hokkien; Teochew; Cantonese with some Mandarin & English dialogue
- No. of episodes: 16

Production
- Producer: Zheng Geping 郑各评
- Running time: approx. 45 minutes
- Production company: Mediacorp

Original release
- Network: Mediacorp Channel 8
- Release: 4 January – 19 April 2019

Related
- How Are You? 2 (2020)

How Are You?
- Traditional Chinese: 好世謀
- Simplified Chinese: 好世谋
- Literal meaning: ""How Are You"
Transcriptions
Standard Mandarin
- Hanyu Pinyin: Hǎo Shì Móu
Yue: Cantonese
- Jyutping: Hou2 Sai3 mau4
Southern Min
- Teochew Peng'im: ho2 si3 mou5

How Are You?
- Traditional Chinese: 好勢嘸
- Simplified Chinese: 好势呒
- Literal meaning: ""How Are You"
Transcriptions
Southern Min
- Hokkien POJ: hó sè bô͘

How Are You? (traditional Chinese: 好世謀; simplified Chinese: 好世谋) is a Singapore non-Mandarin Chinese drama series which is telecast on Singapore's free-to-air channel, Mediacorp Channel 8. It stars Michelle Yim, Zhu Houren, Chen Liping, Romeo Tan, Sheila Sim, Ya Hui, Desmond Ng, Joshua Tan, Richard Low, Roy Li and Cynthia Koh. This is the fifth non-Mandarin Chinese drama to be produced on Channel 8. This is also the first mainstream TV drama project with Zheng Geping as executive producer.

A Mandarin-dubbed version of the show will aired on Astro AEC at 8.30 PM in Malaysia and Channel 8 at 9.00 PM in Singapore from 3 April 2019, which does not air the opening and ending theme songs. The original version also aired on Malaysia's 8TV.

== Cast ==
Mark Lee as a story teller who narrates the story of the show.

- Zhu Houren as Gong Jiaqiao 龚家翘, a wheel-chaired bound man selling tissues and lottery tickets
- Chen Liping as
  - Guo Meili 郭美莉
  - Dai Anna 戴安娜, a toilet cleaner at a community centre
    - Huang Yingen as a younger Dai Anna
- Roy Li as Gong Qinghu 龚清湖, a property agent
- Cynthia Koh as Pan Meiruo 潘美若
- Ivan Lo 卢楷浚 as Dai Zhengxiong 戴正雄
- Wang Changli 王昌黎 as He Xiaoxi 何晓息, Zeng Shanmei's husband
- Anna Lim 林茹萍 as Zeng Shanmei 曾善美, He Xiaoxi's wife
- Sheila Sim as He Qingqing 何青青, a social worker
- Ya Hui as He Baibai 何白白, a community center's manager
- Romeo Tan as Xiao Lang 萧郎, Xie Xiangyi's husband
- Michelle Yim as Xie Xiangyi 谢香怡, Xiao Lang's wife
- Romeo Tan as Xiao Gandang 萧敢当
  - Alston Yeo (杨峻毅) as young Xiao Gandang
- Joshua Tan as Xiao Ganzuo 萧敢做 / Ouyang Ming 欧阳明
  - Alfred Ong (王勇畯) as young Joshua Tan
- Richard Low as Ma Sai 马赛
- Wallace Ang 洪圣安 as Ma Deliang 马德良, Ma Sai's son
- Desmond Ng as Mei Dahan 梅达瀚
- Ye Shipin as Uncle Wei 威叔, Ah E's husband
- Zhu Lili 朱莉莉 as Ah E 阿娥
- Denise Camilia Tan as Hui Guiniang

Additionally, Richie Koh appeared as Shaun, Xiao Gandang and Mei Dahan's friend. Suhaimi Yusof as Sulaiman 苏莱曼, an employee of a Community Centre, Constance Song as Ace, a customer at the Dart Pub. Joanna Dong as Manager Dong 董经理, a shop manager. Chen Shucheng as a scheming Mr Ng 钟老板. Xiang Yun as Zhang Jingyu 张晶玉, a senior staff nurse. Zoe Tay as Dr Michelle Soong 宋医生. Kym Ng and Chen Hanwei portrayed a couple who are prospective clients of Gong Qinghu. Aaron Aziz as a Member of Parliament.

== Accolades ==
Organisation	Year	Category	Nominees	Result	Ref
Star Awards	2021	Young Talent Award	Ivan Lo	Nominated	
Star Awards	2021	Best Actress	Chen Liping	Nominated	
