= My Star Bride =

2021 Singaporean television series

- Promotional poster
- Traditional Chinese: 過江新娘
- Simplified Chinese: 过江新娘
- Literal meaning: "The Foreign Bride"
- Hanyu Pinyin: Guòjiāng xīnniáng
- Genre: Drama; Romantic comedy
- Screenplay by: Chen Yuying; Dai Enmin; Zhang Fuqi
- Story by: Wu Cuicui
- Directed by: Gao Xiuhui; Zhang Yuanting
- Starring: Chantalle Ng; Xu Bin
- Opening theme: "Revise" by Jocie Guo
- Ending theme: "Fragile" by Jones Shi; "Feel" by YC and AL4HA
- Country of origin: Singapore
- Original languages: Mandarin; Vietnamese
- No. of seasons: 1
- No. of episodes: 20

Production
- Executive producer: Leong Lye Lin
- Running time: 45 minutes
- Production company: Mediacorp

Original release
- Network: Channel 8
- Release: 28 January – 26 February 2021

Related
- My Star Bride - Hi, Mai Phương Thảo

My Star Bride (Chinese: 过江新娘) is a 2021 Singaporean romantic comedy drama series starring Chantalle Ng and Xu Bin. It was the most-watched Mediacorp programme of the year, attracting more than 582,000 viewers on average per episode.

At the Star Awards 2022, it was named Best Drama Serial.

In China, My Star Bride topped the list of foreign dramas available on major streaming site Youku, just within three days of its release on the platform.

== Cast ==
- Chantalle Ng as Mei Fangcao (Mai Phương Thảo)
- Xu Bin as Zhong Shijie
- Edwin Goh as Zhong Shiming
- Gini Chang as Ouyang Shanshan (Mai Phương Nhi / Mei Fangni)
- Desmond Ng as Qin Shengli
- Cynthia Koh as Zhong Peipei
- Rayson Tan as Zhang Daqian
- Zhu Houren as Zhong Yongnian
- Lin Meijiao as Pan Xiuqin
- Zheng Geping as Ouyang Long
- Aileen Tan as Tang Liyin
- Bunz as Liao Zhengda
- Christy Mai as Kimberly
- Glenn Yong as Osmond
- Vanessa Ho as Bella
- Jernelle Oh as Hu Xianglan (Hồ Hương Lan)
- Daryl-Ann as Yuzhen (Ngọc Trinh)
- Cheryl Chou as Xiao Songya
- Alan Tan as Hu Wenhua (Hồ Văn Hoa)

=== Special appearances ===
- Brandon Wong as Zhong
- Jin Yinji as Zhenzhu
- Kayly Loh as Susu

== Spinoff sequel ==
A telemovie sequel titled My Star Bride - Hi, Mai Phương Thảo (过江新娘 - 你好，梅芳草) began filming in early December 2021 and lasted for three weeks. It was released on 1 February 2022.

The telemovie, which runs at 104 minutes, features most of the characters from the television series with Shane Pow joining the returning cast.

== Awards and nominations ==
Awards	Category	Recipient	Result	Ref.
Asian Academy Creative Awards 2021	Best Actress in a Supporting Role (National Winners - Singapore)	Cynthia Koh	Won	
New York Festivals TV and Films Awards 2022	Best Original Music / Lyrics	"Revise"	Bronze	
New York Festivals TV and Films Awards 2022	Best Performance by an Actress	Chantalle Ng	Finalist	
Star Awards 2022	Best Drama Serial	My Star Bride	Won	
Star Awards 2022	Best Theme Song	"Revise"	Won	
Star Awards 2022	Best Actor	Xu Bin	Nominated	
Star Awards 2022	Best Actress	Chantalle Ng	Nominated	
Star Awards 2022	Best Supporting Actor	Zhu Houren	Nominated	
Star Awards 2022	Best Supporting Actress	Lin Meijiao	Won	
Star Awards 2022	Best Supporting Actress	Cynthia Koh	Nominated	
Star Awards 2022	Favourite Male Show Stealer	Xu Bin	Won	
Star Awards 2022	Favourite Female Show Stealer	Chantalle Ng	Won	
Star Awards 2022	Favourite CP	Xu Bin and Chantalle Ng	Won	
