= Strike Gold =

- Promotional poster
- 黄金巨塔
- Genre: Drama
- Starring: Desmond Tan; He Ying Ying; Yvonne Lim; Yao Wenlong; Benjamin Tan; Edwin Goh; Jin Yinji
- Country of origin: Singapore
- Original language: Mandarin
- No. of episodes: 20

Original release
- Network: Mediacorp Channel 8
- Release: 16 January – 14 February 2023

Strike Gold (Chinese: 黄金巨塔) is a 2023 Singaporean drama produced and telecast on Mediacorp Channel 8. It stars Desmond Tan, He Ying Ying, Yvonne Lim, Yao Wenlong, Benjamin Tan, Edwin Goh and Jin Yinji.

== Cast ==
- Desmond Tan as Liu Guang Ming
- He Ying Ying as Mei Xiao Xi
- Kiki Lim as Mei Xiao Xiao
- Yvonne Lim as Lisa Fang
- Yao Wenlong as Mei You Yong
- Benjamin Tan as Joshua
- Edwin Goh as Liu Guang Hui
- Hong Huifang as Cardboard Granny
- Jin Yinji as Grandma DuDu
- Tyler Ten as Ray
- Rachel Wan as Mina
- Ayden Sng as Jiang Wenhao
- Joey Swee as Ruby
- Jeffrey Xu as Ke Nan

== Accolades ==
Organisation	Year	Category	Nominee(s)	Result	Ref.
ContentAsia Awards	2023	Best Supporting Actor in a TV Programme/Series Made in Asia	Jeffrey Xu	Nominated	
Star Awards	2024	Best Supporting Actress	Hong Hui Fang	Nominated	
Star Awards	2024	MY PICK Most Hated Villain	Jeffrey Xu	Nominated	
