= Fiona Fussi =

Singaporean fashion model (born 1996)

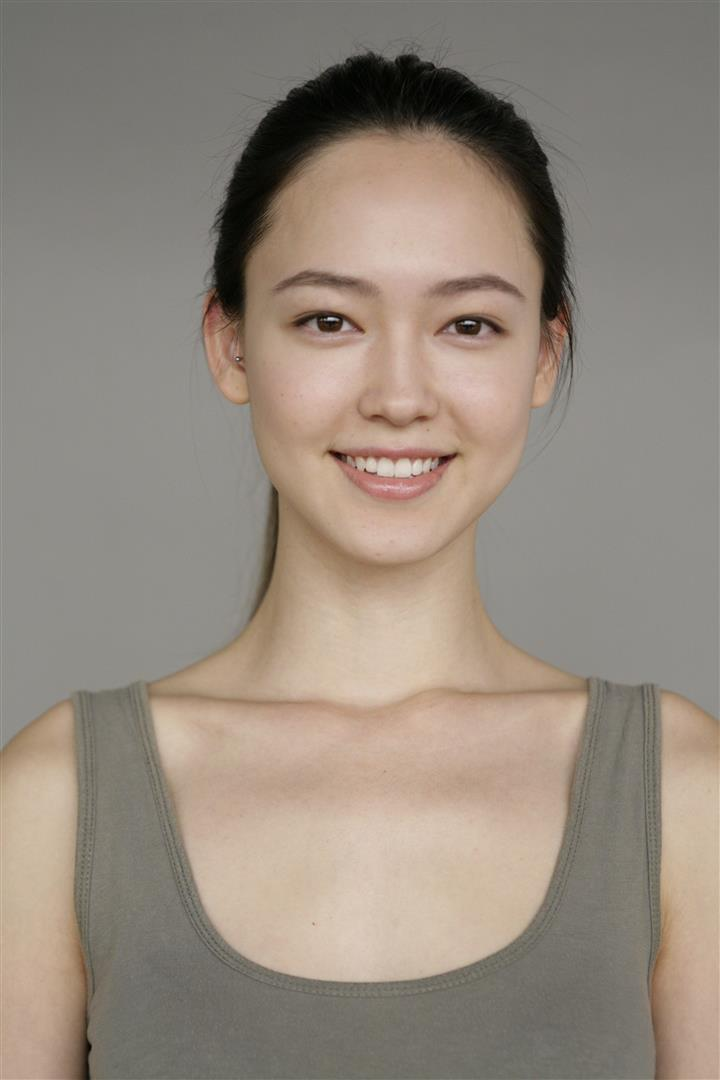
- Born: Fiona Fussi; 25 January 1996 (age 30); Singapore
- Occupation: Fashion Model
- Years active: 2012–present
- Modeling information
- Height: 176 cm (5 ft 9 in)
- Hair color: Dark Brown
- Eye color: Brown
- Agency: Basic Models Management
- Website: www.fionafussi.com

Fiona Fussi (born 25 January 1996) is a Singaporean fashion model and actress based in Singapore. She is best known as a celebrity model, and for being the winner of Elite Model Look Singapore 2011.

== Early life ==
Fiona Fussi was born in Singapore on 25 January 1996 to an Austrian father and a Hong Kong Chinese mother and grew up in the city-state. She attended the United World College of South East Asia, graduating in 2014. She speaks English, German, Cantonese, and Mandarin.

== Career ==
In 2011, at the age of 15, Fussi won the Elite Model Look Singapore 2011 competition. She then represented Singapore at the Elite Model Look International 2011 event held in Shanghai, China.

In 2012, she was the face of Audi Fashion Festival, a major fashion event in Singapore. In 2014, she became the first model ambassador from Singapore to represent the global beauty brand L'Oreal Paris in Asia. In 2016, she became the ambassador of Acuvue Define in Asia and has also appeared in TV commercials for Darlie, Hang Seng Bank, LG Electronics and HKT. She has also appeared in a series of makeup and skincare tutorials for Chanel and Clarins. She was the first person of Asian descent to be a face for Chanel. In 2018, she appeared in TV commercials for LG Electronics.

She is represented by Singapore modeling agency Basic Models Management, Sun Esee Model Management in Hong Kong, Ford Models in the USA, Cinq Deux Un Co. in Japan, and MP Paris in France.

In addition to her modeling work, she has also starred in the TV series Last Madame (2019), as the character Chi Ling, as well as playing the role of Jeon So-yeon in Oppa, Saranghae! (2023).

Fussi also launched a lifestyle brand called Late Night Thoughts Club, which includes an online platform where her fans can share about their mental health journeys.
