= Lina Ng =

Singaporean actress and host (born 1974)

- Born: 6 May 1974 (age 52); Singapore
- Education: Geylang Methodist Secondary School
- Occupations: Actress; host; businesswoman; educator
- Years active: 1993–present
- Spouse: Mike Lam (m. 2004)
- Children: 3

Chinese name
- Chinese: 黄嫊方
- Hanyu Pinyin: Huáng Sùfāng

Lina Ng Su Fang (born 6 May 1974) is a Singaporean actress and host. She was a full-time Mediacorp and SPH MediaWorks artiste from 1993 to 2004, but currently films on an ad-hoc basis.

To date, Ng is the first and only actress to win both an Asian Academy Creative Award and an Asian Television Award in Singapore. In 2021, Ng received the Asian Television Award for Best Supporting Actress for her role as a majie in the English-language series Last Madame. She also runs Mustard Seeds Academy, which provides Chinese enrichment classes to childcare centres.

== Career ==
Ng entered the entertainment industry after finishing as the first runner-up in the local talent-search competition Star Search 1993. Other contestants included Ann Kok and Ivy Lee; in 2009, Kok revealed that Ng was "openly competitive" during the competition. Ng later joined SPH MediaWorks, and left full-time acting following its merger with MediaCorp. Since then, she has appeared in a number of productions including the 2012 series, Joys of Life.

Ng was nominated for Top 10 Most Popular Female Artistes from 1995 to 1998.

In 2017, Ng appeared in Have A Little Faith, where she played an abusive mother. Shortly after, she played another supporting role in My Teacher Is a Thug. She went on to play the leading role in Channel 5 series Lion Mums 2.

In 2018, she was cast in the Toggle original drama series Close Your Eyes.

== Personal life ==
Ng married Mike Lam, a Physical Education teacher, on 9 September 2004 and they have three sons. She taught for three years at a pre-school before running a Mandarin enrichment company with former actress Evelyn Tan.

== Filmography ==
=== Television series and show hosting ===
Year	Title	Role	Notes	Ref
1993	That Moment In Time (红尘独舞)	Xiong Li		
1994	Double Life (潇洒走一回)	Annie		
1994	The Young Ones (壮志骄阳)	He Xiaofang		
1994	Love At Last (真心男儿)	Tian Feifei		
1995	Strange Encounters III (奇缘 III 之《深水情郎》)	Ye Wanlian		
1995	Strange Encounters III (奇缘 III 之《青衣魅影》)	Xiao Linglong / Bai Yue'er		
1995	The Teochew Family	Mai Xiaodong		
1996	Legend of the White Hair Brides	Hamaya		
1996	Royal Battle of Wits (妙师爷三斗毒太监)	Li Xiaolian		
1996	Tales of the Third Kind II (第三类剧场II 之《毒咒》)	Qiuyan		
1996	Brave New World (新阿郎)	Li Xiaoman		
1997	The Silver Lining			
1997	The Price of Peace	Cuicui		
1998	Living In Geylang (芽笼芽笼)	Zheng Yinghua		
1998	City Beat (城人杂志)	—N/a	Variety show	
1998	Right Frequency	Little Trumpet		
1999	Right Frequency II	Little Trumpet		
2000	Right Frequency III	Little Trumpet		
2009	Perfect Cut 2	Herself	Cameo	
2010	With You	Chen Xiaomin		
2012	Joys of Life	Little Trumpet		
2012	Game Plan	Zhao Xinyi		
2015	Tiger Mum	He Shengmei		
2016	The Truth Seekers	Song Lizhu		
2016	You Can Be An Angel 2	Zhuang Qunfang		
2017	Have A Little Faith	Li Qiuhe		
2017	My Teacher Is a Thug	Li Lijun		
2017	Lion Mums 2	Chae Lian		
2018	Close Your Eyes (闭上眼就看不见)	Lynn		
2018	The Distance Between (下个路口遇见你)	Chen Meiying		
2019	Walk With Me (谢谢你出现在我的行程里)	Principal	Cameo	
2019	Lion Mums 3	Chae Lian		
2019	The Play Book (爱本)	Lina	A Directorial debut project by Bryan Wong	
2019	Last Madame	Ah Yoke		
2019	The Driver (司机)	Sister Kun		
2019	After The Stars (攻星计)	Liu Lili		
2020	Diary of Amos Lee (阿莫的日记)	Amos Lee's Mother		
2020	Terror Within (内颤)	Lin Xiuhong		
2020	Ti Tou Dao: Inspired By The True Story Of A Wayang Star	Ang Di		
2020	Super Dad (男神不败)	Liu Xuehua		
2021	Control (操控)	Chen Qiying		
2021	Mind Jumper (触心罪探)	Irene		
2021	Crouching Tiger Hidden Ghost	Rich Woman Leong		
2021	A Whole World Difference (都市狂想)	Su Anru		
2022	Home Again (多年后的全家福)	Hong Baozhen		
2022	Truths About Us (别来无恙)	Wu Yufang		
2022	Your World in Mine	Xiu Zhu		
2022	Dark Angel (黑天使)	Fan Simin		
2023	Fix My Life	Yuan Manying's mother		
2023	Silent Walls	Luo Yinyin		
2023	Family Ties	Liu Yuzhi		
2023	All That Glitters	Zhu-jie		
TBA	Alienated			

=== Film ===
Year	Title	Role	Notes	Ref
2005	One More Chance	Wu Meilian		
2007	Just Follow Law	Bee Hwa		
2017	The Fortune Handbook	Contestant No.1	Cameo	
2021	Late Night Ride			

=== Web series ===
Year	Title	Role	Notes	Ref
TBA	Miss Tanya		Douyin miniseries	

== Awards and nominations ==
Year	Ceremony	Category	Nominated work	Result	Ref
1995	Star Awards	Top 5 Most Popular Female Artistes	—N/a	Nominated	
1996	Star Awards	Top 5 Most Popular Female Artistes	—N/a	Won	
1997	Star Awards	Top 10 Most Popular Female Artistes	—N/a	Nominated	
1998	Star Awards	Best Actress	Living In Geylang	Nominated	
1998	Star Awards	Top 10 Most Popular Female Artistes	—N/a	Nominated	
2019	Star Awards	Top 10 Most Popular Female Artistes	—N/a	Won	
2020	New York Festivals TV & Film Awards	Best Performance by an Actress	Last Madame	Finalist	
2020	Asian Academy Creative Awards	Best Actress in a Supporting Role	Last Madame	Grand winner	
2021	Asian TV Awards	Best Actress in a Supporting Role	Last Madame	Won	
2021	Star Awards	Best Supporting Actress	Terror Within	Nominated	
2021	Star Awards	Top 10 Most Popular Female Artistes	—N/a	Nominated	
2022	Star Awards	Best Supporting Actress	Key Witness (as Ye Lina)	Nominated	
2022	Star Awards	Top 10 Most Popular Female Artistes	—N/a	Nominated	
2022	Asian TV Awards	Best Leading Female Performance	Lion Mums	Nominated	
2023	Star Awards	Best Supporting Actress	Your World in Mine (as Xiu Zhu)	Nominated	
2023	Star Awards	Most Hated Villain	Your World in Mine (as Xiu Zhu)	Nominated	
2023	Star Awards	Top 10 Most Popular Female Artistes	—N/a	Nominated	
2024	Star Awards	Top 10 Most Popular Female Artistes	—N/a	Nominated	
2025	Star Awards	Top 10 Most Popular Female Artistes	—N/a	Nominated	
