= 23:59 (film) =

- Film poster
- Directed by: Gilbert Chan
- Written by: Gilbert Chan
- Story by: Gilbert Chan; Ng Say Yong
- Produced by: Gary Goh; Au Yuk Sing; Freddie Yeo
- Starring: Mark Lee; Henley Hii; Josh Lai; Tedd Chan; Lawrence Koh
- Cinematography: Kelvin Keehoe
- Edited by: Natalie Soh
- Music by: Darren Ng
- Production companies: Gorylah Pictures; Clover Films; Grand Brilliance mm2 Entertainment
- Distributed by: Golden Village Pictures; Clover Films
- Release dates: 3 November 2011 (Singapore); 29 December 2011 (Malaysia)
- Running time: 78 minutes
- Countries: Singapore; Malaysia
- Language: Mandarin-English

23:59 is a 2011 Singaporean-Malaysian horror film directed by Gilbert Chan. It stars Mark Lee, Henley Hii, Josh Lai, Tedd Chan and Lawrence Koh. The film has a sequel titled 23:59: The Haunting Hour, released in 2018.

== Plot ==
In 1983, a platoon of recruits are about to complete basic training on a jungle island (based on Pulau Tekong). They hear a ghost story which says that a mad woman living on the island had died at 23:59 (11:59 PM) and her spirit would return to haunt the camp at the same time. Tan, the platoon outcast, tries to convince his buddy, Jeremy, that he is being haunted by the woman's ghost, but Jeremy does not believe him.

When the platoon embarks on a route march in the jungle, Tan goes missing and ends up being found dead. Although the recruits and their sergeant believe that Tan's death was due to supernatural forces, their officer insists that it was an accident. Jeremy has a nightmare about seeing Tan's ghost indicating that Chester, another recruit, will be next to die.

The following night, Chester is possessed by a spirit and has to be restrained until a priest is called in to exorcise him. Jeremy later confronts Chester about Tan's death and learns that Chester and Tan had encountered the ghost of a woman on the night they did guard duty together. Jeremy has also seen the same ghost a few times since the night of Tan's death.

Jeremy and Chester ask a local and find out that the woman was a medium who had given birth to a deformed girl. The girl grew up being ostracised due to her appearance and because she and her mother were believed to be cursed.

That night, Chester and Jeremy hear a strange noise and follow it into the jungle, where Chester is killed by an unseen force. Jeremy injures his leg while trying to flee and unknowingly takes shelter in the medium's house. He finds the medium's skeleton on a rocking chair and encounters her ghost again. She tells him that she was not responsible for the recruits' deaths; it was actually her daughter's ghost who killed them. It turns out that years ago, the medium had poisoned her daughter to death and then committed suicide. Jeremy is possessed by the medium's ghost, who apologises and reconciles with her daughter's ghost. The sergeant and two recruits eventually find Jeremy in the house. He recovers and returns home safely after completing basic training.

In the present day, three recruits talk about the same ghost story on the island. When it is 23:59, they hear the same strange noise.

== Cast ==
- Tedd Chan as Tan
- Henley Hii as Jeremy
- Lawrence Koh as Dragon
- Tommy Kuan as Lim
- Josh Lai as Chester
- Mark Lee as Sergeant Kuah
- Stella Chung as Shirley
- Susan Leong as Yi Gu
- Benjamin Lim as Captain Hong

== Release ==
23:59 was released in Singapore on 3 November 2011 and in Malaysia on 29 December 2011.
