= 23:59: The Haunting Hour =

- Directed by: Gilbert Chan
- Written by: Gilbert Chan; Lim Tze Chien; Huang Junxiang; Link Sng
- Produced by: Tan Fong Cheng; Gary Goh; Toong Soo Wei
- Starring: Mark Lee; Noah Yap; Richie Koh; Fabian Loo; Natalia Ng
- Cinematography: Jordan Chiam
- Edited by: Natalie Soh; Gan Jia Yi; Pagit Yong
- Music by: Alex Oh
- Production companies: Gorylah Pictures mm2 Entertainment
- Distributed by: Clover Films
- Release date: 9 August 2018
- Running time: 89 minutes
- Country: Singapore
- Languages: English; Mandarin
- Box office: $616,313

23:59: The Haunting Hour (Chinese: 2359猛鬼兵营), is a 2018 Singaporean horror comedy anthology film directed by Gilbert Chan. A sequel to the film 23:59 (2011), it stars Mark Lee, Noah Yap, Richie Koh, Fabian Loo and Natalia Ng.

== Plot ==
Tommy, who is currently serving National Service, maintains a blog, where he posts about horror stories which features a trifecta of stories spanning over different critical eras in the history of Singapore's national service.

== Cast ==
- Fabian Loo as REC Tommy
- Mark Lee as MWO T G Teo
- Noah Yap as Seng
- Natalia Ng as Snake Woman
- Richie Koh as REC Desmond Cheng

== Release ==
The film was released in theatres on 9 August 2018, National day. The film was a box office hit.

== Reception ==
Liu Yongjian of Lianhe Zaobao gave the film 2 and a half stars out of five for entertainment and one star out of five for art. John Lui of The Straits Times gave the film 2.5 stars out of 5 in his review of the film, stating, "While somewhat redeemed by its last story, which warns us that often, the stranger you are sexting with might want something more than a steamy chat, the most frightening thing about this horror movie is the wasted potential." Douglas Tseng of 8 DAYS also gave the film 1.5 star out of 5 in his review of the film, stating, "Lame and lackluster, The Haunting Hour is more like Amateur Hour. Whatever potential Chan showed in the first movie isn’t here; he really dropped the ball on this one, and it fell through the floor and straight into the pits of Hell. What’s truly frightening is that this movie actually got made." He included the movie on his list of the worst movies of 2018.
