= Last Madame =

Singaporean TV series

- Traditional Chinese: 最後的夫人
- Simplified Chinese: 最后的夫人
- Hanyu Pinyin: Zuìhòu de fūrén
- Genre: Erotic historical drama
- Starring: Joanne Peh; Jeff Chou; Lina Ng; Brandon Wong; Constance Lau; Fiona Fussi; Ky Tan; Alan Wan
- Country of origin: Singapore
- Original language: English
- No. of episodes: 12

Production
- Executive producer: Jean Yeo
- Running time: approx. 60 minutes
- Production company: Ochre Pictures

Original release
- Network: meWATCH; Mediacorp Drama on YouTube
- Release: 26 September 2019 – 2019

Related
- Last Madame: Sisters of the Night (2023)

Last Madame (Chinese: 最后的夫人) is a 2019 Singaporean television series and Toggle Original created by Jean Yeo, featuring Joanne Peh, Jeff Chou, Lina Ng, Brandon Wong, Constance Lau, Fiona Fussi, Ky Tan, and Alan Wan. The English language 12-parter, which weaves a present-day plotline with another set in the 1930s about a brothel owner, is a story of intrigue involving spies, murders, romance and an old shophouse. The series aired on Mediacorp in Singapore and premiered on 26 September 2019 on MeWatch.

It is the first M18 English Drama produced locally, and the second highest rated locally produced drama.

A prequel, Last Madame: Sisters of the Night, was made available on meWATCH from 13 July 2023.

== Synopsis ==
Shrouded with secrets and mysteries, a run-down shophouse in Singapore draws attention to banker Chi Ling who returns from Hong Kong to claim its inheritance. As she discovers the drudgeries and intrigues of her great-grandmother’s world – in a brothel set in late 1930s Singapore – she is pushed to decide the fate of the building and to reconcile with her roots and history. The Last Madame is a story that intertwines two seemingly opposite generations through the fascinating story of Chi Ling and her great-grandmother, Fung Lan.

A story of the past and present – The Last Madame tells the story of the last brothel owner, Fung Lan, in 1930s Singapore. Set in 2019, the successful but cold-hearted Chi Ling returns from Hong Kong to settle an inheritance from her great-grandmother, Fung Lan – only to discover that therein lies deeper and controversial histories behind house.

== Cast ==
=== Main ===
- Joanne Peh as Fung Lan

Ruthless and cold-hearted, Fung Lan is a former prostitute, now the head of a brothel, The House of Phoenix (Fung Wong Gok), in 1930s Singapore. Educated, she fled from her well-to-do family and an arranged marriage as a young girl, only to find herself caught in a deplorable state of affairs that led her to where she is now. She has since remade herself and in light of a grisly murder of the century, changes are abounding her future and the future of the brothel – and we find that there is more to Fung Lan than meets the eye. Fung Lan is a survivor. She wants to take control of her life and beat men at their own game. To her, if you can’t win them, join them and be the boss – and save your kind while you are at it. Seeking revenge, she has achieved it. But now she wants to avoid being caught for her dark past.

- Jeff Chou as Inspector Mak

=== Main and supporting ===
- Lina Ng as Ah Yok
- Brandon Wong (actor) as Lou Seh
- Constance Lau as Siu Lan
- Amanda Ang as Soh Fan
- Fiona Fussi as Chi Ling
- Ky Tan as Guo Wen
- Alan Wan as Harry
- Kiki Lim as Mui Gwai

== Awards and nominations ==
Year	Award	Category	Recipient	Results	Ref
2020	New York Festivals - TV & Film Awards	Best Performance by an Actress	Amanda Ang	Bronze	
2020	New York Festivals - TV & Film Awards	Streaming Drama	Last Madame	Finalist	
2020	New York Festivals - TV & Film Awards	Best Performance by an Actress	Lina Ng	Finalist	
2020	New York Festivals - TV & Film Awards	Best Production Design/Art Direction	Last Madame	Finalist	
2020	New York Festivals - TV & Film Awards	Drama	Last Madame	Finalist	
2020	New York Festivals - TV & Film Awards	Best Costume Design	Last Madame	Finalist	
2020	New York Festivals - TV & Film Awards	Best Direction	Jean Yeo	Finalist	
2020	New York Festivals - TV & Film Awards	Crime Drama	Last Madame	Finalist	
2020	Asia Contents Awards	Best Asian Drama	Last Madame	Finalist	
2020	Asian Academy Creative Awards	Best Actress in a Supporting Role	Lina Ng	Won	
2020	Asian Television Awards	Best Drama Series	Last Madame	Nominated	
2020	Asian Television Awards	Best Actress in a Leading Role	Joanne Peh	Nominated	
2020	Asian Television Awards	Best Actor in a Supporting Role	Brandon Wong (actor)	Nominated	
2020	Asian Television Awards	Best Actress in a Supporting Role	Lina Ng	Won	
2020	Asian Television Awards	Best Actress in a Supporting Role	Amanda Ang	Nominated	
2020	Asian Television Awards	Best Cinematography	Fong Hing Loong & Fong Heng Kit	Nominated	
2020	Asian Television Awards	Best Script Writing	Jean Yeo	Nominated	
2020	Asian Television Awards	Best Script Writing	Claire Merquita	Nominated	
2020	Asian Television Awards	Best Digital Fiction Program/Series	Last Madame	Won	
2020	Asian Television Awards	Best Leading Male Performance - Digital	Jeff Chou	Nominated	
2020	Asian Television Awards	Best Leading Female Performance - Digital	Joanne Peh	Won	
