= Ho Weng Toh =

Singaporean bomber pilot (1920–2024)

Captain Ho Weng Toh
- 何永道
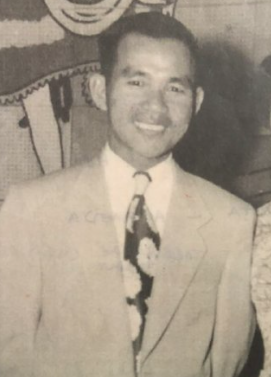
- Ho in the late 1940s
- Born: 1920; Ipoh, Perak
- Died: 6 January 2024 (aged 103); Singapore
- Other names: Winkie
- Spouse: Augusta Rodrigues (m. 1949; died 1977)
- Children: 3

Ho Weng Toh (Chinese: 何永道; 1920 – 6 January 2024), also known as Winkie, was a Singaporean World War II bomber pilot for the Chinese-American Composite Wing (Provisional) (sometimes called the "Flying Tigers") and later a pioneer pilot for Singapore Airlines.

== Early life ==
Ho was born in a small town in Ipoh, Perak in 1920 to a shoe shop merchant from China. He was the sixth of six children. He had his primary and secondary education in Malaysia but managed to attend university as his uncle was a rich tin miner.

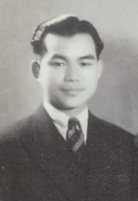
Ho during the Japanese occupation of Hong Kong.

He attended St. Stephen's College in Stanley and Lingnan University in Hong Kong in 1941 whilst the Japanese invaded China. He later escaped with his fellow students from China after enduring the Japanese occupation for a few months by bribing bandits to take them across the border.

He stated that he had also seen the bombing of Kai Tak Airport. Ho left Hong Kong and went to Guangzhou where he saw a poster for air force recruitment. He then became a trainee pilot for the Chinese-American Composite Wing (Provisional) in 1942 and trained with other pilots in Arizona.

== Career ==
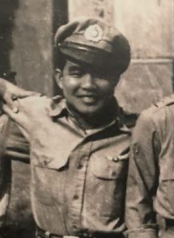
Ho in the early 1940s during World War II.

After his training, Ho was sent on missions as a B-25 Mitchell bomber pilot and performed over 18 missions in occupied China during World War II and returned to Ipoh when he was done. After the war, Ho was stationed in Hankou, Wuhan as an instructor. He later went to Shanghai and became a commercial pilot for Central Air Transport Corporation.

After the fall of Shanghai, he and Augusta left and went to Singapore in 1951, where he joined Malayan Airlines and later became a pilot for Singapore Airlines after Malayan Airlines split. He worked at Singapore Airlines for 30 years and retired in 1980 as a chief pilot of Singapore Airlines' Boeing 737 fleet.

== Personal life ==
Ho had been living in Singapore since 1953 till his death in 2024. Ho met Portuguese Augusta Rodrigues during his stint in Shanghai and they got married on 5 May 1949.

Their son was born in Guangzhou and daughter in Hong Kong. They later all got Singaporean citizenship. His wife died in 1977 of lung cancer.

In 2019, he released a book titled Memoirs of a Flying Tiger: The Story of a WWII Veteran and SIA Pioneer Pilot from the advice of George Yeo. In 2023, a short film called Flying Tigers based on his life was released and he was portrayed by Richie Koh.

Ho died on 6 January 2024 at the age of 103.

== In media ==
Captain Ho's wartime endeavours were featured in Channel News Asia's 2020 documentary Forgotten Heroes.
