= Your World in Mine =

2022 Singaporean television series

- Promotional poster
- Traditional Chinese: 你的世界我們懂
- Simplified Chinese: 你的世界我们懂
- Literal meaning: "We Understand Your World"
- Hanyu Pinyin: Nǐ de shìjiè wǒmen dǒng
- Genre: Drama
- Story by: Lau Ching Poon
- Directed by: Zhang Huiying
- Starring: Huang Biren; Richie Koh; Yao Wenlong; Hong Ling; Zong Zijie; Desmond Ng
- Opening theme: 你的世界 (Your World) by Lennerd LIm 林健辉
- Ending theme: 宿命 by LYNX 林延芯
- Country of origin: Singapore
- Original language: Mandarin
- No. of seasons: 1
- No. of episodes: 20

Production
- Executive producer: Chong Liung Man
- Cinematography: Zhuo Mingde
- Editor: Xu Jiayan
- Running time: 46 minutes
- Production company: Mediacorp

Original release
- Network: Channel 8
- Release: 18 July – 12 August 2022

Your World in Mine (Chinese: 你的世界我们懂) is a 2022 Singaporean drama series starring Huang Biren, Richie Koh, Yao Wenlong, Hong Ling, Zong Zijie and Desmond Ng. The series was broadcast on Mediacorp Channel 8 from 18 July 2022 to 12 August 2022. It received generally positive critical reviews and won six awards at the Star Awards 2023, including Best Drama Serial, Best Actor for Richie Koh and Best Actress for Huang Biren.

== Synopsis ==
Jian Qiang and Jia Yun have three children, eldest daughter Tian Xi, second son Tian Wei, and the youngest son Tian Cai. Tian Cai is an intellectually disabled 21-year-old who sees a different world from his family, inadvertently creating stressful situations at home. When Tian Cai was diagnosed with intellectual disability, Jia Yun's world crashed, but fortunately Jian Qiang was there to be her pillar of support. The children are now grown up, and they thought the toughest period is over, but unbeknownst to them, the biggest crisis their family will face is yet to come...

== Cast ==
- Richie Koh as Zheng Tiancai
- Yao Wenlong as Zheng Jianqiang
- Huang Biren as Li Jiayun
- Hong Ling as Zheng Tianxi
- Zong Zijie as Zheng Tianwei
- Desmond Ng as Hong Maodan
- Zhu Houren as Hong Xingwang
- Xiang Yun as Wang Jinhui
- Ben Yeo as Hong Maoqiao
- Priscelia Chan as Chen Linlin
- Zhu Xiufeng as Zhang Baoyu
- Guo Liang as Sam
- Seow Sin Nee as Fu Jiali
- Lina Ng as Fu Xiuzhu

== Awards and nominations ==
Organisation	Year	Category	Recipient	Result	Ref.
4th Asia Contents Awards	2023	Best Content	Your World in Mine	Nominated	
ContentAsia Awards	2023	Best Supporting Actress in a TV Programme/Series	Xiang Yun	Won	
New York Festivals TV and Films Awards	2023	Best Drama	Your World in Mine	Finalist	
New York Festivals TV and Films Awards	2023	Best Screenplay	Your World in Mine	Finalist	
Star Awards	2023	Best Drama Serial	Your World in Mine	Won	
Star Awards	2023	Best Theme Song	"你的世界" by Lennerd Lim	Won	
Star Awards	2023	Best Actor	Richie Koh	Won	
Star Awards	2023	Best Actor	Desmond Ng	Nominated	
Star Awards	2023	Best Actress	Huang Biren	Won	
Star Awards	2023	Best Actress	Hong Ling	Nominated	
Star Awards	2023	Best Supporting Actor	Zhu Houren	Nominated	
Star Awards	2023	Best Supporting Actress	Xiang Yun	Won	
Star Awards	2023	Best Supporting Actress	Lina Ng	Nominated	
Star Awards	2023	MYPICK! Favourite Male Show Stealer	Richie Koh	Won	
Star Awards	2023	MYPICK! Favourite Female Show Stealer	Hong Ling	Nominated	
Star Awards	2023	MYPICK! Favourite Female Show Stealer	Huang Biren	Nominated	
Star Awards	2023	MYPICK! Favourite Female Show Stealer	Xiang Yun	Nominated	
Star Awards	2023	MYPICK! Favourite CP	Desmond Ng and Hong Ling	Nominated	
Star Awards	2023	MYPICK! Favourite CP	Yao Wenlong and Huang Biren	Nominated	
Star Awards	2023	MYPICK! Most Hated Villain	Lina Ng	Nominated	
Star Awards	2023	MYPICK! Most Hated Villain	Priscelia Chan	Nominated	
