= Constance Lau =

21st-century Singaporean actress

- 刘佳鎂
- Born: 8 April 1991 (age 35); Singapore
- Education: Nanyang Academy of Fine Arts
- Occupations: Actress, model, radio personality

Constance Lau Jia Mei (Note: Chinese: 刘佳鎂; pinyin: Liú Jiāměi) (born 8 April 1991) is a Singaporean actress and model. She is best known for her role as Celine Lim in the 2018 American romantic comedy-drama film Crazy Rich Asians.

== Early life ==
Lau is from Singapore and is of Chinese ancestry. Her father is a lawyer. Lau has stated that she was bullied in school and found support in her school's drama club, which she was encouraged by teachers to join.

== Career ==
Lau began her career as a model. She is signed with FLY Entertainment. In 2008 she was a finalist in The New Paper New Face modeling competition and began working in commercial modeling shortly after, appearing in advertisements for Singtel and Marina Bay Sands. Lau was also in a music video for MICapella. She studied theatre at Nanyang Academy of Fine Arts while working as a radio presenter at a local station, hosting the programs Say It With Music and The Evening Lush.

In 2015 Lau was featured in the television film Love is Love; Sunrise as the character Shelley.

Lau portrayed Celine Lim, also known as Radio One Asia, in the 2018 film Crazy Rich Asians, based on the novel of the same name by Kevin Kwan. She was the only Singaporean to be featured by Vanity Fair in The Must-See Looks from the Crazy Rich Asians Premiere and was featured in E!'s Best Dressed list. She received media attention for being the only cast member from Crazy Rich Asians to wear a dress by Singaporean designers on the red carpet at the film's premier.

In 2019, Lau played the role of Siu Lan in the drama series Last Madame.
