= Desmond Ng =

Singaporean actor and singer (born 1987)

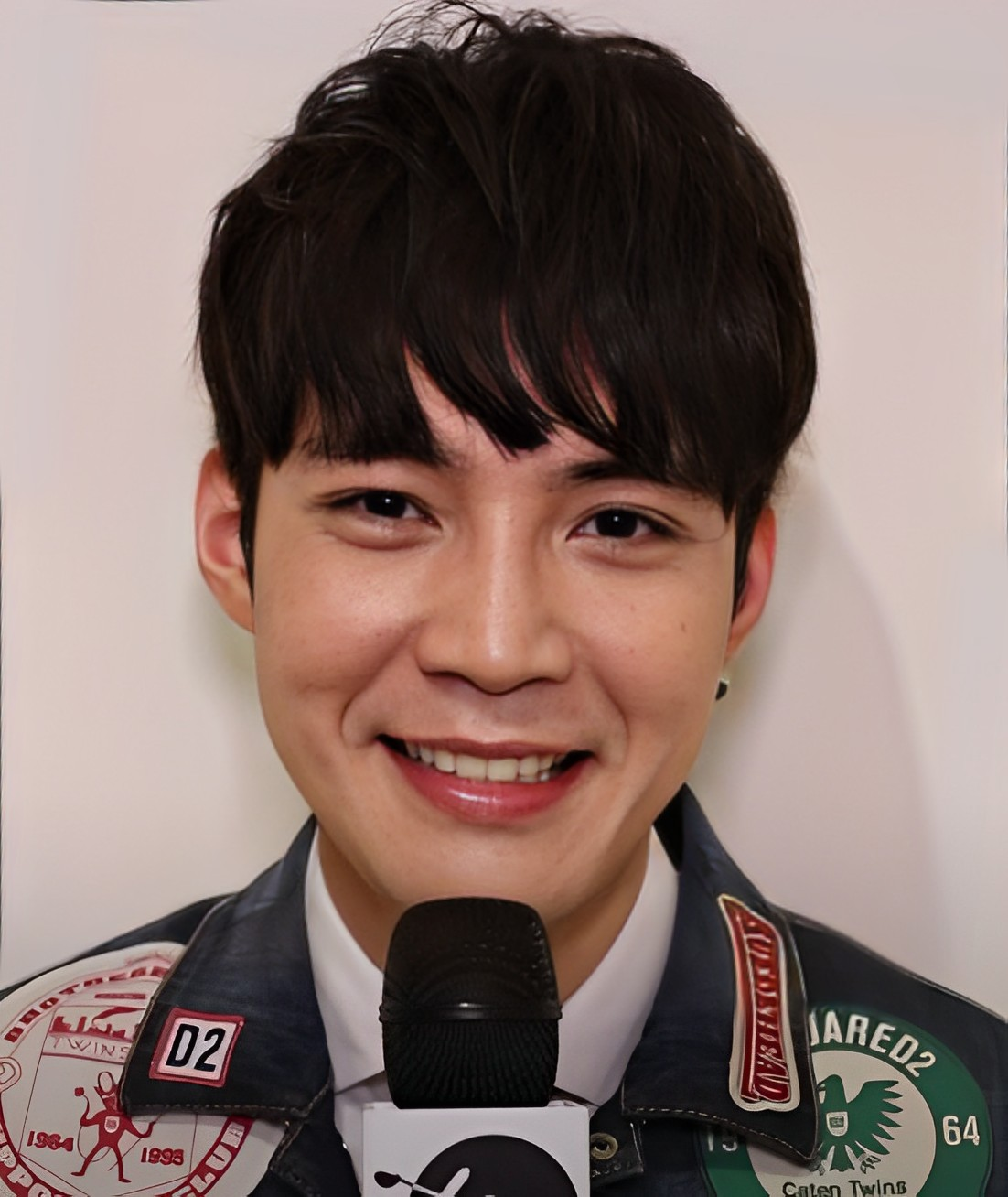
- Ng in April 2017
- Born: 5 October 1987 (age 39); Singapore
- Other name: Huang Zhenlong
- Occupations: Singer; actor; host; businessman
- Years active: 2009–present
- Spouse: Kanny Theng (m. 2025)
- Awards: Full list
- Musical career
- Genres: Mandopop; Chinese rock
- Instrument: Vocals
- Member of: AL4HA

Chinese name
- Chinese: 黃振隆
- Hanyu Pinyin: Huáng Zhènlóng

Desmond Ng (born 5 October 1987) is a Singaporean actor, singer, presenter and businessman. Ng debuted in 2009 as a getai singer and in 2015, became the champion of the Mediacorp Getai Challenge. He then signed with Mediacorp The Celebrity Agency as an artiste.

== Career ==
In 2016. Ng made his acting debut with Mediacorp Chinese drama television series Hero as Mr. Lu He also acted in 118 II as Xiao Bing.

Ng, Lin Chengze, Huang Xiuping, and Luo Yiqi sang the theme song of the movie Long Long Time Ago directed by Jack Neo. Ng also hosted the Mediacorp Channel 8 program Bengpire. In 2017, he presented the Mediacorp Channel 8 program Oh My Heroes, and participated in the Mediacorp Channel 8 TV series Have A Little Faith as Jeff. In 2018, he presented the Mediacorp Channel 8 programmes Taste of Nanyang and Thrift Hunters, as well as the singing competition programme GeTai Challenge 2018. He also presented the Mediacorp Channel 8 programme Fun With SINGnese (2018–2019) for its first and second seasons. In 2019, he appeared in the MediaCorp Channel 8 television series Dear Neighbours as Liao Zhenxiong / Egg Boy, and Mediacorp Channel 8 TV series Old Is Gold as Liu Junyang.

Ng participated in the MediaCorp Channel 8 television series How Are You? as Mei Dahan (Be Tahan) for both seasons (2019–2020), a role in which he mainly spoke in the Hokkien language. He also sang the sub-theme song for the series, "I Will Sing For You Everyday" (Hokkien: "逐工为你唱歌"; mandarinized as "每天为你唱歌"), alongside the Malaysian singer Bonnie Loo. In 2020, he also acted in the Mediacorp mewatch online Series Love Unbound as Xiao Yu, and presented the Mediacorp Channel 8 programme Song We Love.

In 2021, he appeared in the Channel 8 TV series My Star Bride as Qin Shengli, and the Channel 8 TV series The Heartland Hero, where he played the role of Fang Zhongcheng. Ng got his first Best Actor nomination in the Star Awards 2023 after appearing in the Channel 8 series Your World in Mine as Hong Maodan.

In 2024, he played the role of Will in the Chinese New Year drama Once Upon A New Year's Eve. The same year, Ng performed a 2024 rendition of "飞高梦远", the theme song of the hit Mediacorp's talent reality program Star Search.

== Ventures ==
He co-founded the streetwear label Imperfect in 2020.

== Personal life ==
Ng married Kanny Theng, a model, in 2025.

== Filmography ==
Television series

Year	Title	Role	Notes	Ref
2019	Dear Neighbours	Joey		
2019	Old Is Gold	Liu Junyang		
2019	How Are You?	Mei Dahan (Be Tahan)		
2020	Love Unbound	Xiao Yu		
2021	My Star Bride	Qin Shengli		
2021	The Heartland Hero	Fang Zhongcheng		
2022	Your World in Mine	Hong Maodan		
2024	Once Upon A New Year's Eve	Will		

== Awards and nominations ==
Organisation	Year	Category	Work	Result	Ref.
Star Awards	2023	Best Actor	Your World in Mine	Nominated	
