= Richie Koh =

Singaporean actor (born 1993)

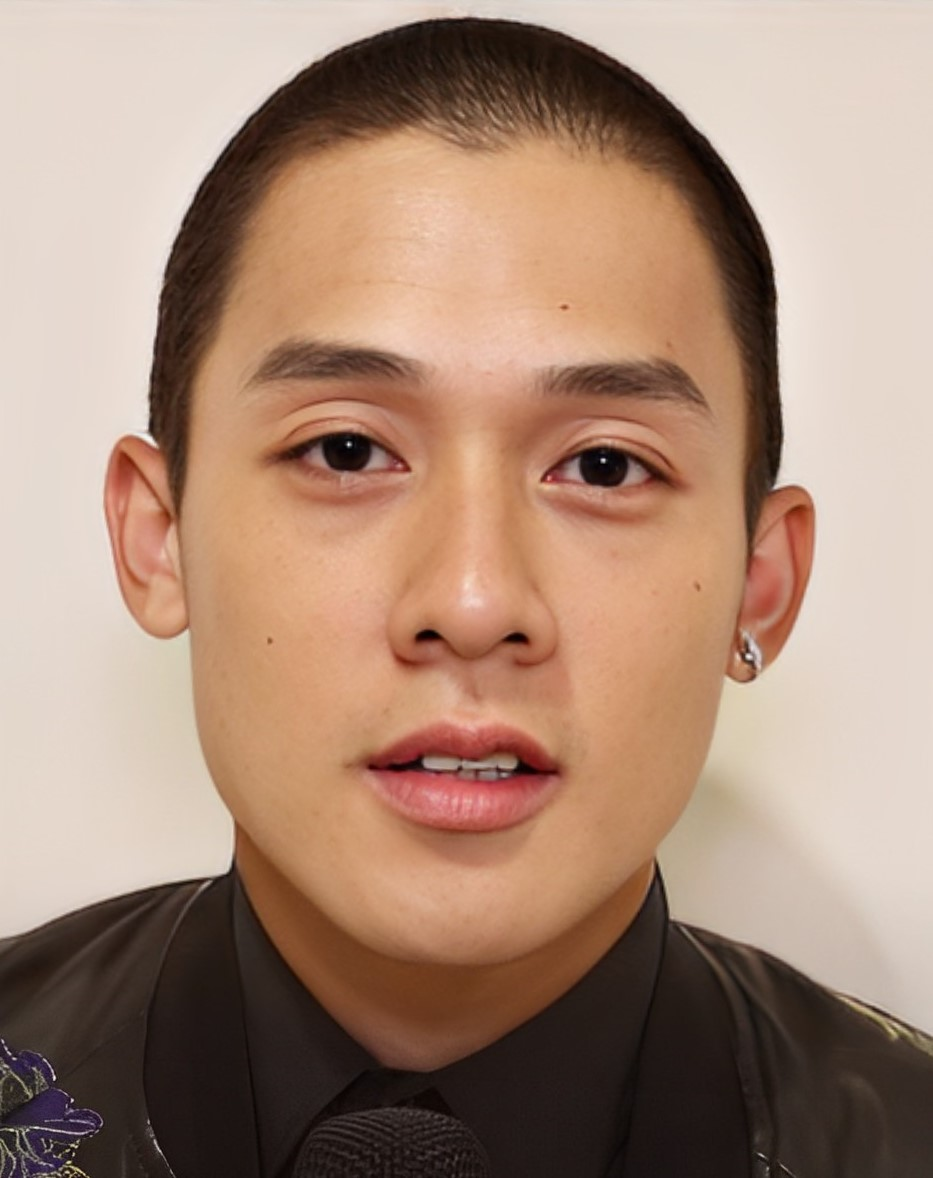
- Koh in September 2023
- Born: 16 June 1993 (age 33); Singapore
- Other name: Xu Ruiqi
- Education: Ngee Ann Polytechnic
- Occupation: Actor
- Years active: 2017–present
- Agents: Mediacorp; The Celebrity Agency

Chinese name
- Traditional Chinese: 許瑞奇
- Simplified Chinese: 许瑞奇
- Hanyu Pinyin: Xǔ Ruìqí

Richie Koh (born 16 June 1993) is a Singaporean actor who is signed to Mediacorp.

In 2023, Koh won the Star Awards for Best Actor for his critically acclaimed role as an intellectually disabled young adult in the drama series Your World in Mine. At the age of 29, he is also the second youngest recipient of the award, after Christopher Lee who won in 1997 at the age of 26.

In 2025, he received a nomination for the Golden Horse Award for Best Leading Actor for his performance in the film A Good Child.

== Early life ==
Koh was born on 16 June 1993. He graduated from Ngee Ann Polytechnic with a Diploma in Financial Informatics in 2014.

== Career ==
In 2013, Koh was scouted when Channel U’s Hey Gorgeous team went to various campuses in Singapore looking for suitable contestants. He garnered much support during the competition and emerged as first runner-up. He chose the stage name "Rui Qi" as his stage name on the advice of Singaporean host-actress Quan Yi Fong.

In 2017, after serving National Service, Koh started his career by debuting in Channel 8’s army-themed drama When Duty Calls, a major role that charmed viewers' hearts. Fans sang praises of his natural acting and good looks, factors which landed him his first nomination for Best Newcomer in Star Awards 2018. October that year saw Koh jetting off to Changzhou, Jiangsu for a month to film China-web movie The Legendary Detective of the Shanghai Bund where he played an assistant to the agency detective.

The following year, Koh made cameo appearances in long-running Channel 8 drama Life Less Ordinary and Toggle series Die Die Also Must Serve. In addition, he wrapped up filming on 118 Reunion and made a special appearance in local movie Wonderful! Liang Xi Mei directed by Jack Neo. His role as a gangster boss in the movie saw him gain new fans both here and across the Causeway. Koh also acted in several Toggle Original productions such as Star Crossed, and he took the lead role in Divided as well as The Distance Between. In addition, Koh acted in a Gilbert Chan movie 23:59: The Haunting Hour as a soldier tasked to kill a snake spirit.

On 30 August 2018, The Celebrity Agency announced that Koh would be expanding his career to China after it signed a co-management contract with China’s LongAllStar Entertainment Group. Koh trained in China for 2 months to hone his acting skills before returning to Singapore.

In 2021, Koh starred as Zhu Yongjie in Live Your Dreams, where he was nominated MyPick! Favourite Male Show Stealer and Favourite CP in Star Awards 2022.

In 2022, Koh soared to fame after starring in the immensely popular Your World in Mine as an intellectually disabled Zheng Tiancai. For this role, he received the Best Actor award at the Star Awards 2023, which was also his first time being nominated in that category. Koh was also nominated Best Actor in a Leading Role at the Asian Television Awards in 2022.

In 2025, Koh received his first nomination for the Golden Horse Award for Best Leading Actor for his performance in the drama film A Good Child, in which he portrayed a drag queen caring for his estranged mother. The nomination was announced as part of the 62nd Golden Horse Awards, marking one of Singapore’s few acting nominations at the Taiwanese film awards. He was nominated alongside Chang Chen, Joseph Chang, Will Or and Lan Wei-hua, with Chang Chen ultimately winning the award.

== Personal life ==
Koh is in a relationship with fellow actress Hayley Woo. Woo confirmed she was dating Koh and called him a "romantic boyfriend" on the Valentine's Day on 14 February 2024.

== Filmography ==
=== Television series ===
Year	Title	Role	Notes	Ref.
2017	When Duty Calls	Lu Xianfeng		
2017	Life Less Ordinary	Song Baojian	Cameo	
2018	Fam	Malcolm Wong		
2018	Star Crossed	Weng Leong		
2018	Die Die Also Must Serve (战备好兄弟)	Junkang	Cameo	
2018	118 Reunion (118 大团圆)	Yang Wei		
2018	Divided (分裂)	Li Renyi		
2018	The Distance Between (下个路口遇见你)	Amos Song		
2019	How Are You?	Shaun	Cameo	
2019	Playground (游乐场)	Jackson Wong		
2019	If Only (离归)	Zhenfeng	Directorial debut project	
2020	Crimewatch 2020	Daryl Cheong Zhi Yong	Episode 10	
2021	CTRL	Huang Xuezhong		
2021	Live Your Dreams (大大的梦想)	Zhu Yongjie		
2022	It's All Your Fault! (都是你啦 !)	Kelvin Wong		
2022	Your World in Mine	Zheng Tiancai		
2022	Crimewatch 2022	Eric Lim Yong Sheng	Episode 4	
2022	Summer Wind (被风吹过的夏天)	Pan Borui	Singaporean-Chinese production	
2023	Mr Zhou's Ghost Stories@Job Haunting II	Dr Fang		
2023	Cash on Delivery	Lin Juncong		
2023	Whatever Will Be, Will Be	Liu Birang	Dialect series	
2023	Till the End	Peng You		
2024	Artificial Kin (爱不虚拟)	Lu Xiao Ming		
2024	Coded Love			
2025	Another Wok of Life			

=== Film ===
Year	Title	Role	Notes	Ref.
2018	Wonderful! Liang Xi Mei	Big Boss		
2018	23:59: The Haunting Hour	Recruit Desmond Cheng		
2020	The Diam Diam Era	Ah Huat		
2021	The Diam Diam Era Two	Ah Huat		
2023	Flying Tigers	Captain Ho Weng Toh	Short film	
2025	A Good Child	Jia Hao		
2026	Luck My Life	Tian Cai		
TBA	The Legendary Detective Of The Shanghai Bund (上海滩神探)	Xiao Ding		

== Awards and nominations ==
Organisation	Year	Category	Nominated work	Result	Ref.
Asian Television Awards	2022	Best Actor in a Leading Role	Your World in Mine	Nominated	
Golden Horse Awards	2025	Best Leading Actor	A Good Child	Nominated	
Star Awards	2018	Best Newcomer	When Duty Calls	Nominated	
Star Awards	2022	Favourite Male Show Stealer	Live Your Dreams	Nominated	
Star Awards	2022	Favourite CP	Live Your Dreams	Nominated	
Star Awards	2023	Best Actor	Your World in Mine	Won	
Star Awards	2023	Favourite Male Show Stealer	Your World in Mine	Won	
Star Awards	2023	Top 3 Most Popular Rising Stars	—N/a	Won	
Star Awards	2024	Best Actor	Cash On Delivery	Nominated	
Star Awards	2024	The Show Stealer	Cash On Delivery	Nominated	
Star Awards	2024	Favourite CP	Cash On Delivery	Nominated	
Star Awards	2024	Favourite CP	Till The End	Nominated	
Star Awards	2024	Top 10 Most Popular Male Artistes	—N/a	Nominated	
Star Awards	2024	Bioskin Most Charismatic Artiste Award	—N/a	Won	
Star Awards	2025	Best Actor	Coded Love	Nominated	
Star Awards	2025	Top 10 Most Popular Male Artistes	—N/a	Won	
Star Awards	2026	Best Actor	Another Wok of Life	Nominated	
Star Awards	2026	Top 10 Most Popular Male Artistes	—N/a	Won	
