= Fuchun Secondary School =

- Sekolah Menengah Fuchun 福春中学 ஃபூக்சுன் உயர்நிலைப் பள்ளி

Location
- 21 Woodlands Avenue 1 Woodlands; 739062; Singapore; 1°25′49.04″N 103°46′38.17″E

Information
- School type: Government secondary school
- Established: 2 January 1986; 40 years ago
- Status: Operational
- Principal: Doris Lim
- Gender: Coeducational
- Age range: 13 to 17
- Enrollment: 1500+
- Classes: Secondary 1 to 5 (Express, Normal Academic, Normal Technical)
- Mascot: EON 2.0
- Colours: White Blue
- Website: fuchunsec.moe.edu.sg

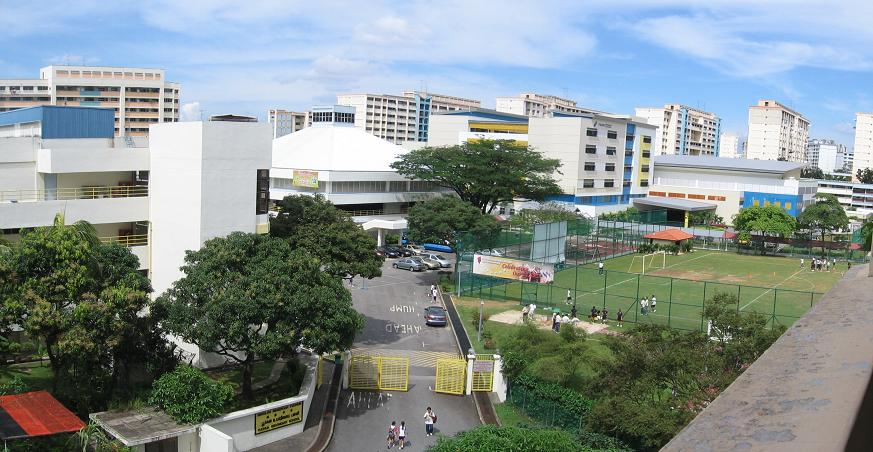
Fuchun Secondary School (left) and Fuchun Primary School (right)

Fuchun Secondary School (FCSS) is a co-educational government secondary school in Woodlands, Singapore.

== History ==
The school was first opened on 2 January 1986, housed in a new S$7.3 million campus along Woodlands Avenue 1. It was officially opened by Senior Parliamentary Secretary for National Development Lee Yiok Seng on 5 August 1987.

As announced by the Ministry of Education on 7 April 2021, the school will be merged with Woodlands Ring Secondary School in 2024 and move to the premises of Woodlands Ring Secondary School.

== Co-curricular activities ==
The school offers a total of 24 extra-curricular activities, which are labelled as co-curricular activities (CCAs) by the Singapore Ministry of Education.

The CCAs offered in the school are as follows:

=== Physical sports ===
- Basketball
- Football
- Netball
- Sepak Takraw

=== Uniformed groups ===
- Boy's Brigade
- Girl's Brigade
- Girl Guides
- NCC (Land)
- NPCC

=== Visual and performing arts ===
- Concert Band
- Choir
- Chinese Dance
- Indian Dance
- Malay Dance
- Modern and Cultural Dance
- Guitar Ensemble
- Guzheng Ensemble
- Festive Drums and Lion Dance Troupe

=== Clubs and societies ===
- Green Club
- Infocomm Club
- Interact Club
- Library
- Mechatronics Club
- Singapore Youth Flying Club

== Notable alumni ==
- Somaline Ang: Mediacorp actress
