= Hong Ling (actress) =

Singaporean actress (born 1994)

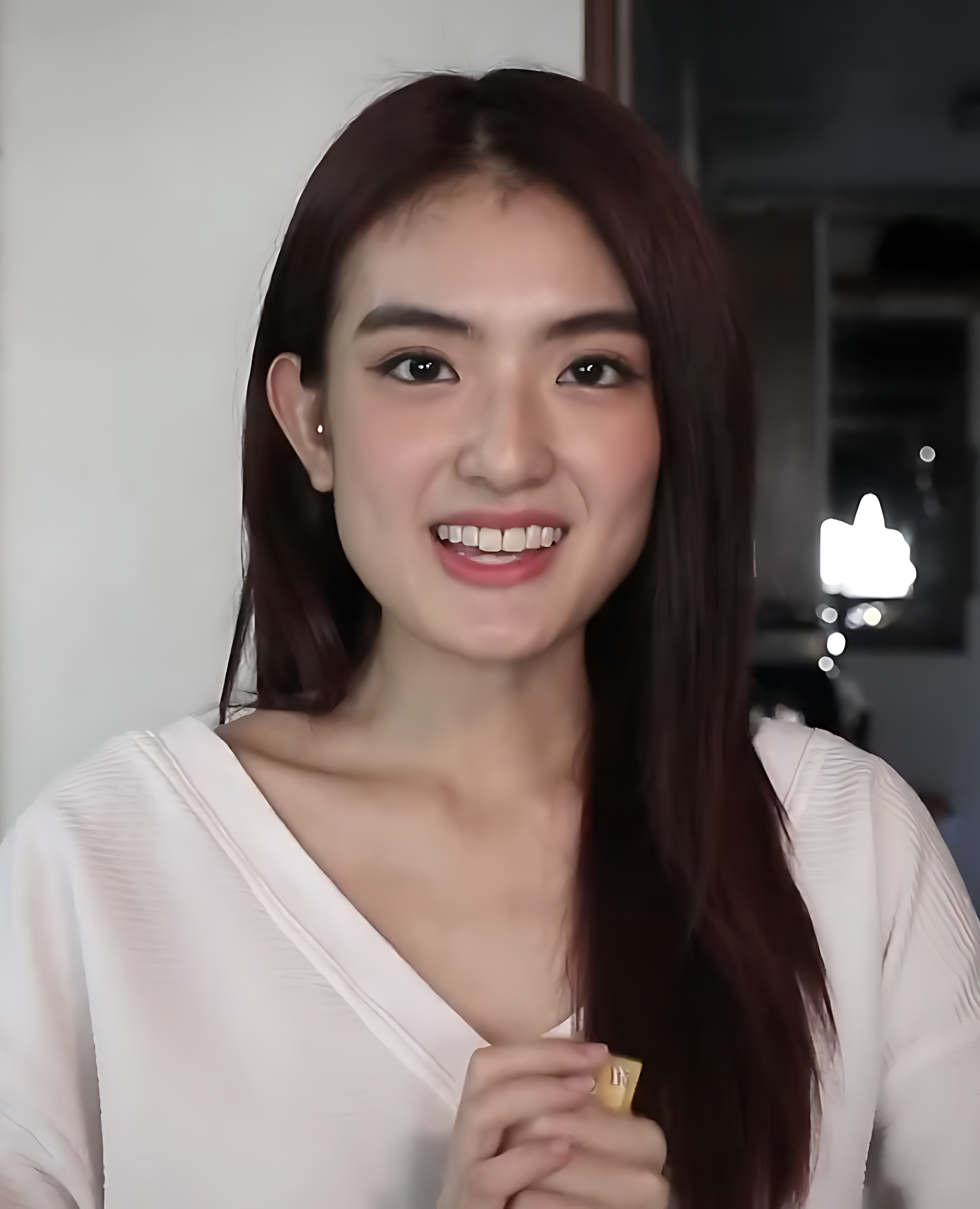
- Hong in 2017
- Born: Somaline Ang Ling; 16 August 1994 (age 31); Singapore
- Education: Fuchun Secondary School; Temasek Polytechnic; Singapore Media Academy
- Occupations: Actress; businesswoman
- Years active: 2014−present
- Spouse: Nick Teo (m. 2023)
- Relatives: Casiline Ang (sister)
- Awards: Full list

Chinese name
- Chinese: 洪凌
- Hanyu Pinyin: Hóng Líng

Hong Ling (born Somaline Ang Ling; 16 August 1994) is a Singaporean actress.

== Early life and education ==
Born to a Thai mother and a Singaporean Chinese father, Hong graduated from Fuchun Secondary School. She has two siblings, a younger brother and a younger sister. She was scouted while studying at Temasek Polytechnic, though she disrupted her studies due to career interest as an actress.

== Career ==
Hong was discovered through talent search programme Hey Gorgeous, in which she emerged as one of the semi-finalists in 2013. During the talent search programme, she was introduced as Somaline Ang, her Thai name.

In Star Awards 2021, she obtained her first Top 10 Most Popular Female Artistes award.

== Personal life ==
Hong is a Christian. Her younger sister, Casiline Ang, is a tattoo artist who is known for her black-and-grey and colour realism tattoos.

Hong started dating fellow Mediacorp actor Nick Teo after starring in the long-form drama series 118 together. They founded the bird's nest brand House of the Swiftlet in January 2019. After seven years of dating, the couple announced their engagement in August 2022 and married on 14 December 2023.

== Filmography ==
=== Television series ===
| Year | Title | Role | Notes | Ref. |
|---|---|---|---|---|
| 2014 | Blessings | Research writer | Cameo | |
| 2014 | In the Name of Love | Bai Xiaoshan's cousin | Cameo | |
| 2015 | You Can Be an Angel Too | Jane | Cameo | |
| 2015 | 118 | Wang Yuye | | |
| 2016 | Hero | Herself | Cameo | |
| 2016 | Soul Reaper (勾魂使者) | Baby | Cameo | |
| 2016 | I Want to Be a Star | Zhang Meiyi | | |
| 2016 | The Dream Job | Pan Xiaoxue | | |
| 2016 | The Truth Seekers | Bai Momoko | | |
| 2017 | Home Truly | Zheng Peizhi | | |
| 2017 | 118 II | Wang Yuye | | |
| 2018 | 29th February (229明天见) | Ye Zhihui | | |
| 2018 | Love At Cavenagh Bridge (加文纳桥的约定) | Lin Lin | | |
| 2018 | Fifty & Fabulous (五零高手) | Ma Ruolin | | |
| 2018 | 118 Reunion | Wang Yuye | | |
| 2019 | Jalan Jalan (带你去走走) | Jiang Xiaoqing | | |
| 2020 | My Guardian Angels (单翼天使) | Yap Sijin | | |
| 2020 | Mister Flower (花花公子) | Chen Xueli | | |
| 2021 | Soul Old Yet So Young (心里住着老灵魂) | Shi Zhiwei | | |
| 2021 | The Heartland Hero (邻里帮) | Jasmine | Cameo | |
| 2021 | The Take Down (肃战肃绝) | Dai Yuxin | | |
| 2022 | You Can Be An Angel 4 (你也可以是天使 4) | Yan Yefeng | | |
| 2022 | Your World in Mine | Zheng Tianxi | | |
| 2023 | Fix My Life | Yuan Manying | | |
| 2023 | All That Glitters | Li Zhenting | | |
| 2024 | Unforgivable | | | |
| 2025 | The Spirit Hunter | | | |

== Discography ==
=== Compilation albums ===
| Year | Title | Ref. |
|---|---|---|
| 2017 | MediaCorp Music Lunar New Year Album 17 (新传媒群星咕鸡咕鸡庆丰年) | |
| 2018 | MediaCorp Music Lunar New Year Album 18 (阿狗狗旺旺過好年) | |
| 2019 | MediaCorp Music Lunar New Year Album 19 (新传媒群星猪饱饱欢乐迎肥年) | |
| 2020 | MediaCorp Music Lunar New Year Album 20 (裕鼠鼠纳福迎春了) | |
| 2022 | MediaCorp Music Lunar New Year Album 22 (新传媒群星旺虎泰哥迎春乐) | |

== Awards and nominations ==
| Organisation | Year | Category | Nominated work | Result | Ref. |
|---|---|---|---|---|---|
| Star Awards | 2015 | Best Newcomer | —N/a | Nominated | |
| Star Awards | 2015 | Tokyo Bust Express Sexy Babe Award | —N/a | Won | |
| Star Awards | 2016 | Favourite Female Character | 118 | Nominated | |
| Star Awards | 2017 | Top 10 Most Popular Female Artistes | —N/a | Nominated | |
| Star Awards | 2019 | Top 10 Most Popular Female Artistes | —N/a | Nominated | |
| Star Awards | 2021 | Top 10 Most Popular Female Artistes | —N/a | Won | |
| Star Awards | 2022 | Top 10 Most Popular Female Artistes | —N/a | Won | |
| Star Awards | 2023 | Best Actress | Your World in Mine | Nominated | |
| Star Awards | 2023 | Favourite Female Show Stealer | Your World in Mine | Nominated | |
| Star Awards | 2023 | Favourite CP | Your World in Mine | Nominated | |
| Star Awards | 2023 | Top 10 Most Popular Female Artistes | —N/a | Nominated | |
| Star Awards | 2024 | Top 10 Most Popular Female Artistes | —N/a | Won | |
| Star Awards | 2025 | Best Actress | Unforgivable | Nominated | |
| Star Awards | 2025 | BYD Favourite Female Character Award | Unforgivable | Nominated | |
| Star Awards | 2025 | MYPICK! Most Emotional Performance | Unforgivable | Won | |
| Star Awards | 2025 | Top 10 Most Popular Female Artistes | —N/a | Won | |
| Star Awards | 2026 | Best Actress | The Spirit Hunter | Nominated | |
| Star Awards | 2026 | Top 10 Most Popular Female Artistes | —N/a | Won | |
