= Star Awards 2023 =

Singaporean television awards

Star Awards 2023 红星大奖 2023
- Sponsored by: Holistic Way; Wells Singapore; Royal Caribbean International; Singlife
- Date: 30 March 2023 (Gala Night); 9 April 2023 (Main Ceremony)
- Location: Marina Bay Sands, Singapore
- Presented by: Bioskin; Chan Brothers
- Hosted by: Backstage: Jeremy Chan; Hazelle Teo; Zhu Zeliang; Ke Le; Jernelle Oh; Lim Pinjuen; Walk of Fame: Dennis Chew; Hazelle Teo; Main show: Lee Teng; Matilda Tao

Highlights
- Most awards: Your World in Mine (6)
- Most nominations: Your World In Mine (9)
- Best Drama Serial: Your World in Mine
- Best Variety Show: Dishing with Chris Lee
- Formal Awards: All-time Favourite Artiste: Felicia Chin; Rebecca Lim

Television/radio coverage
- Network: Mediacorp Channel 8 Mediacorp Channel U mewatch YouTube; Astro AEC; Astro GO (Channel 302)
- Runtime: 180 mins (Awards Ceremony); 90 mins (Walk-of-fame)

The Star Awards 2023 ceremony, the 28th edition of Star Awards, presented by the Mediacorp, took place on 9 April 2023 at Marina Bay Sands, Singapore. During the gala, Mediacorp presented Star Awards in 12 categories honoring Mediacorp's employees, minor awards in four categories and sponsored awards in two categories. The ceremony was televised on Channel 8. Lee Teng and Taiwanese actress-singer Matilda Tao, hosted the show.

Mediacorp also hosted a gala dinner, held at JW Marriott Hotel on 30 March 2023 and hosted by Hazelle Teo and Dennis Chew. Five Star Awards were also presented during the dinner.

Your World in Mine won six awards, including Best Drama Serial. The Breakfast Quartet - LOVE 972, Dishing with Chris Lee, Forgotten Children, Star Awards 2022 and Mr Zhou's Ghost Stories @ Singapore Sightings won one award each.

== Nominees and winners ==
Nominations for the professional awards were announced on 15 February. Slice of life drama Your World in Mine had the most nominations (nine) and won the most number of awards (six) including Best Drama Serial; many of the nominations were oriented towards younger actors, especially first-timers for Best Actor Richie Koh, Desmond Ng and Ayden Sng, as well as Brandon Wong being the sole nominee to also be nominated for the Best Supporting Actor award; Koh's win also set a record on becoming the youngest recipient of the lead actor role. For the first time since 2001, Huang Biren and Zoe Tay were nominated for Best Actress in the same ceremony, and with both actresses having a tie for the most wins at four at that time, the former would go on to win her fifth award.

In the entertainment categories, Christopher Lee won the Best Programme Host, ending a five-year streak previously held by frequent winner Quan Yi Fong, and Lee becoming the third recipient for the award after Quan and Lee Teng. Das DD also become the first artiste of Indian origin to be nominated for and subsequently win a Performance Award. Both Star Awards and Love 972 The Breakfast Quartet continued their winning streak for their Variety Special and Radio Programme, respectively.

The voting categories were announced on 6 March; while MyPick! category was returned for its second year, in a history first for Star Awards, voting categories were also heavily emphasized and competitive, and there was no cap on the number of artistes eligible for the Top Ten Most Popular Favourite Artistes award as criteria were relaxed, along with the introduction of the Top Three Most Popular Rising Stars award, a non-gender-affiliated voting award for artistes with no more than five years of showbiz experience. In an official statement, the award criteria for "All-Time Favourite Artiste" was also revised, such that wins from the Most Popular Rising Stars Award would count towards the 10 wins needed to be conferred the All-Time Favourite Artiste. The three recipients of the inaugural award were Gao Mei Gui, Richie Koh and Ayden Sng, along with six other first Top 10 recipients Jeremy Chan, Chen Bi Yu, Chen Ning, Jeff Goh, Tasha Low and Denise Camillia Tan. Of the four artistes, Ann Kok, Jesseca Liu, Yvonne Lim, and Pornsak, each with nine Top 10 Most Popular Artistes wins at the time, only Kok and Liu were nominated for, and would go on to win their tenth award. Felicia Chin and Rebecca Lim, the latter being the ninth celebrity to win the Top 10 Most Popular Artistes for ten consecutive ceremonies, were the year's recipients for "All-time Favourite Artiste".

=== Awards ===
Winners are listed first and highlighted in boldface. (Note: Backstage Creative Awards were presented outside the award ceremony with the Best Screenplay winner Dark Angel, written by Bai Xue Ning, and Wang Xiu Si, the Best Director goes to Martin Chan for In Safe Hands, Liang Xue Hui from It's A Small World 2022 won the award for Best variety research writer, and Kang Lay See won the Best Variety Producer award for Dishing with Chris Lee)

Star Awards 2023 - Industry Achievement Awards (March 30, 2023)
Best Drama Serial	Best Radio Programme
**Your World in Mine**; Dark Angel; Genie In A Cup; When Duty Calls (season 2); You Can Be An Angel (season 4)	**The Breakfast Quartet - LOVE 972**; Mr Zhou's Ghost Stories - LOVE972; Small City, Big Matters - CAPITAL 958; The DAKA Show - YES 933; The Shuang and Kunz Show - YES 933
Best Entertainment Programme	Best Infotainment Programme
**Dishing with Chris Lee**; A Night Under The Stars; Hear U Out S3; House Everything? (season 2); King Of Culinary	**Forgotten Children**; As You Grow Old; Being Together : A Family Portrait; Find Me A Singaporean : The Pandemic Special; Old Taste Detective (season 3)
Best Entertainment Special	Best Theme Song
**Star Awards 2022 – Awards Ceremony**; Lunar New Year's Eve Special 2022; River Hongbao 2022 - Singapore Talent Night; Star Awards 2022 – Backstage LIVE; The Star Voice 2022 - Grand Final	**Lennerd Lim - 你的世界 (Your World In Mine)**; xxmxrcs (Marcus Tay) - 加码梦想 (Genie In A Cup); Jocie Guo - 恋香 (Love at First Bite); Meng FM - 怒放 (When Duty Calls (season 2)); Desmond Ng, Lingkai - 天使的微笑 (You Can Be An Angel (season 4)
Best Short-Form Programme
**Mr Zhou's Ghost Stories @ Singapore Sightings**; #justswipelah; Ben Yeo's Kitchen; House Collectors; Jiak Kentang
Star Awards 2023 - Main Ceremony (April 9, 2023)
Best Actor	Best Actress
**Richie Koh - Your World in Mine as Zheng Tiancai**; Ayden Sng - The Unbreakable Bond as Gu Yuncong; Brandon Wong - Leave No Soul Behind as Feng Tianlong; Desmond Ng- Your World in Mine as Hong Maodan; Qi Yuwu - Dark Angel as Zhu Wei	**Huang Biren - Your World in Mine as Li Jiayun**; Hong Ling - Your World in Mine as Zheng Tianxi; Jesseca Liu - Soul Detective as Liu Shuqin; Rebecca Lim - Soul Doctor as Ling Jingyao/Ling Jingqi; Zoe Tay - Dark Angel as He Ziyuan
Best Supporting Actor	Best Supporting Actress
**Brandon Wong - Dark Angel as Ke Zhixiong**; Andie Chen - Sisters Stand Tall as Yang Liwen; Chew Chor Meng - Dark Angelas Yang Tao; Darren Lim - Genie In A Cup as Ma Xiaobao; Zhu Houren - Your World in Mine as Hong Xingwang	**Xiang Yun - Your World in Mine as Wang Jinhui**; Aileen Tan- Dark Angel as Alex; Cynthia Koh- Leave No Soul Behind as Wu Yuwei; Kym Ng - When Duty Calls (season 2) as Lu Meiguang; Lina Ng - Your World in Mine as Xiuzhu
Young Talent Award	Best Evergreen Artiste
**Alfred Ong - Healing Heroes as Huang Zirui**; Chia Zhi Xuan Ivory- Love at First Bite as Young Chang Xiyue; Goh Wee Ann - Home Again as Young Ye Pingan; Mendelsohn Asher Wenyao - Dark Angel as Young Zhu Wei; Nicholas Lim Tao Rui - Dark Angel as Young Chen Yiyi	**Xiang Yun**; Aileen Tan; Hong Huifang; Richard Low; Zhu Houren
Best Programme Host	Best Rising Star
**Christopher Lee - Dishing With Chris Lee**; Bryan Wong - Old Taste Detective (season 3); Darren Lim - A Night Under The Stars; Dennis Chew - Mr Zhou's Ghosts Stories @ Singapore Singtings; Quan Yi Fong - Hear U Out (season 3)	**Das DD - #justswipelah**; Jarrell Huang - In Safe Handsas Wu Guangming; Jernelle Oh - #justswipelah; Kiki Lim - When Duty Calls (season 2) as Goh Guan Lin; Joey Pink- Soul Detectiveas Hannah

=== Special awards ===
This is given to an artist who has received a total of ten "Top 10 Most Popular Male / Female Artiste Awards" and/or "Most Popular Rising Star Award," which do not have to be consecutive. The artiste will receive an All-Time Favourite Artiste Award after winning the tenth popularity award.

**All Time Favourite Artiste** **超级红星**	**Rebecca Lim**	2012 | 2013 | 2014 | **2015** | **2016** | **2017** | **2018** | **2019** | 2021 | **2022**
**All Time Favourite Artiste** **超级红星**	**Felicia Chin**	2006 | 2007 | 2009 | 2010 | **2015** | **2016** | **2017** | **2018** | **2019** | **2022**

== Popularity awards ==
=== Top 10 Most Popular Artistes ===
Table key
10	Winner of 10th award to be named All-Time Favourite Artiste at next ceremony

As with all ceremonies since 2017, nominees will participate in a nationwide poll of 1,000 people from Singapore's population, with an equitable breakdown across various age groups ("Popularity Survey") and public voting, to determine the winners. The voting weightage was also changed to 20%-80% respectively.

Voting was held from 6 March until 9 April 8pm during the ceremony. For the first time ever, there was no maximum cap on the number of artistes eligible to be nominated with a total of 75 artistes (36 females and 39 males) nominated for the Top 10 Most Popular Artistes category. As with ceremonies since 2021 to promote audience participation, the 10 votes per day restriction was lifted during the final hours of voting, occurring on the actual day starting at 12am.

Top 10 Most Popular Female Artistes
Artistes	Top 10
Ann Kok	10
Jesseca Liu	10
Carrie Wong	8
Paige Chua	8
Ya Hui	7
Chantalle Ng	2
Chen Bi Yu	1
Tasha Low	1
Chen Ning	1
Denise Camillia Tan	1
Top 10 Most Popular Male Artistes
Artistes	Top 10
Romeo Tan	8
Guo Liang	8
Desmond Tan	7
Shaun Chen	6
Xu Bin	5
Marcus Chin	3
Desmond Ng	2
Brandon Wong	2
Jeff Goh	1
Jeremy Chan	1

=== Most Popular Rising Stars ===
In addition to the traditional Top 10, this award is aimed at junior artistes with no more than five years of showbiz experience; unlike the Top 10, this award is not gender-affiliated and only the three artistes with the most votes would win the award. Wins in this category will count towards the cumulative number of wins for the "All-Time Favourite Artistes".

Most Popular Rising Star Award
Top 3 Winners	No. of Awards
Ayden Sng	1
Gao Mei Gui	1
Richie Koh	1

=== MyPick! awards ===
A minor award ceremony called MyPICK! which had been presented for the second consecutive year since 2022.

The public voted to select the winners of the MY PICK! categories. Voting began at 12:00 p.m. on March 6, 2023. Voting was free and open to all voters with a valid meCONNECT account. Each voter could only vote once every day in each award category. The results were unveiled on April 9, 2023, during the Star Awards 2023 - Backstage Marathon.

MY PICK!最吸晴男角色 MY PICK! Favourite Male Show Stealer	MY PICK!最吸晴女角色 MY PICK! Favourite Female Show Stealer
Richie Koh - Your World in Mine as Zheng Tiancai 郑天才; James Seah - Soul Detective 灵探 as Bai Ye 白烨; Jeremy Chan - Soul Detective 灵探 as 4896; Qi Yuwu - Dark Angel 黑天使 as Zhu Wei 朱玮; Xu Bin - Love At First Bite 遇见你，真香！ as Martius	Jesseca Liu - Soul Detective 灵探 as Liu Shuqin 刘淑琴; Hong Ling - Your World in Mine as Zheng Tianxi 郑天希; Huang Biren - Your World in Mine as Li Jiayun 李家云; Xiang Yun - Your World in Mine as Wang Jinhui 王金慧; Tasha Low - Genie In A Cup 哇到宝 as She Xiaoqian 佘小倩
MYPICK! 最强CP MYPICK! Favourite CP
Xu Bin and Chantalle Ng - Love At First Bite 遇见你，真香！ as Martius and Chang Xiyue 常喜悦; Xu Bin and Tasha Low - Genie In A Cup 哇到宝 as Ma Deming 马德明 and She Xiaoqian 佘小倩; Desmond Ng and Hong Ling - Your World in Mine as Hong Maodan 洪茂丹 and Zheng Tianxi 郑天希; Yao Wenlong and Huang Biren - Your World in Mine as Zheng Jianqiang 郑坚强 and Li Jiayun 李家云; Herman Keh and Gini Chang - Healing Heroes 医生不是神 as Pan Youxiao 潘佑孝 and Zhou Yige 周亦格
MYPICK! 最讨人厌大反派 MYPICK! Most Hated Villain
Jeffrey Xu 徐鸣杰 - Dark Angel 《黑天使》 as Gu Wangming 顾旺明; Cavin Soh 苏梽诚 - Dark Angel 《黑天使》 as Su Zhian 苏知安; Darren Lim 林明伦 - Genie In A Cup 《哇到宝》 as Ma Xiaobao 马小宝; Lina Ng 黄嫊方- Your World in Mine 《你的世界我们懂》 as Xiuzhu 秀珠; Priscelia Chan 曾诗梅 - Your World in Mine 《你的世界我们懂》 as Chen Linlin 陈琳琳

=== Sponsored awards ===
Bioskin Most Charismatic Artiste Award - Red Carpet

Chan Brothers My Star Guide Award - Backstage

Bioskin Most Charismatic Artiste Award Bioskin 魅力四射奖	Chan Brothers My Star Guide Award 曾兄弟我的导游是红星奖
Ayden Sng; Carrie Wong; Fang Rong; Nick Teo; Richie Koh	Ayden Sng (Destination: Melbourne); Chen Han Wei (Destination: Bhutan); Guo Liang (Destination: China); Herman Keh (Destination: Turkey); Romeo Tan (Destination: Japan)

== Nominations ==
Winning category obtained are marked with bold.

Drama series
Nominations	Winning number	Drama name	Nominated category
9	5	Your World in Mine 《你的世界我们懂》	Best Drama Serial 最佳戏剧; Best Theme Song 最佳主题曲; Best Actor 最佳男主角 (2); Best Actress 最佳女主角 (2); Best Supporting Actor 最佳男配角; Best Supporting Actress 最佳女配角 (2)
6	1	Dark Angel 《黑天使》	Best Drama Serial 最佳戏剧; Best Actor 最佳男主角; Best Actress 最佳女主角; Best Supporting Actor 最佳男配角 (2); Best Supporting Actress 最佳女配角
4	—N/a	When Duty Calls S2 《卫国先锋2》	Best Drama Serial 最佳戏剧; Best Theme Song 最佳主题曲; Best Supporting Actress 最佳女配角; Best Rising Star Award 最佳潜力星
3	—N/a	Genie in A Cup 《哇到宝》	Best Drama Serial 最佳戏剧; Best Theme Song 最佳主题曲; Best Supporting Actor 最佳男配角
2	—N/a	You Can Be An Angel S4 《你也可以是天使4》	Best Drama Serial 最佳戏剧; Best Theme Song 最佳主题曲
2	—N/a	Soul Detective 《灵探》	Best Actress 最佳女主角; Best Rising Star Award 最佳潜力星

Television programme
Nominations	Winning number	Programme name	Nominated category
3	1	#justswipelah 《#刷一刷》	Best Short-Form Entertainment Programme 最佳短篇综艺节目; Best Rising Star Award 最佳潜力星 (2)
2	—N/a	Hear U Out S3 《权听你说 3》	Best Entertainment Programme 最佳综艺节目; Best Programme Host 最佳综艺及资讯节目主持人
2	—N/a	Old Taste Detective S3 古早味侦探 3	Best Entertainment Programme 最佳综艺节目; Best Programme Host 最佳综艺及资讯节目主持人
2	—N/a	A Night Under The Stars 陪你看星星	Best Entertainment Programme 最佳综艺节目; Best Programme Host 最佳综艺及资讯节目主持人
2	2	Dishing with Chris Lee 阿顺有煮意	Best Entertainment Programme 最佳综艺节目; Best Programme Host 最佳综艺及资讯节目主持人
2	1	Mr Zhou's Ghost Stories @ Singapore Sightings 周公讲鬼, 哪里有鬼？	Best Short-Form Entertainment Programme 最佳短篇综艺节目; Best Programme Host 最佳综艺及资讯节目主持人
2	1	Star Awards 2022 红星大奖2022	Best Entertainment Special 最佳综艺特备节目

MYPick! awards
Nominations	Winning number	Drama name	Nominated category
8	1	Your World in Mine 《你的世界我们懂》	Favourite Male Show Stealer 最吸晴男角色; Favourite Female Show Stealer 最吸晴女角色 (3); Favourite CP 最强CP (2); Most Hated Villain 最讨人厌大反派 (2)
3	1	Dark Angel 《黑天使》	Favourite Male Show Stealer 最吸晴男角色; Most Hated Villain 最讨人厌大反派 (2)
3	1	Soul Detective 《灵探》	Favourite Male Show Stealer 最吸晴男角色 (2); Favourite Female Show Stealer 最吸晴女角色
3	—N/a	Genie In A Cup 《哇到宝》	Favourite Female Show Stealer 最吸晴女角色; Favourite CP 最强CP; Most Hated Villain 最讨人厌大反派
2	1	Love At First Bite 《遇见你，真香!》	Favourite Male Show Stealer 最吸晴男角色; Favourite CP 最强CP

== Presenters and performers ==
Order of the presentation, name of the presenter(s), and award(s) they presented
Star Awards 2023 - Industry Achievement Awards (March 30, 2023)
Order	Presenter	Award/Role(s)
1	Kym Ng	Best Radio Programme
2	Angeline Poh; Chief Customer & Corporate Development Officer	Best Infotainment Programme
3	Chen Hanwei	Introduced Genie In A Cup Series
4	Xiang Yun	Introduced You Can Be An Angel S4 Series
5	Jaspers Lai; Mark Lee	Best Short-Form Programme
6	Angeline Poh; Chief Customer & Corporate Development Officer	Best Entertainment Programme
7	Angeline Poh; Chief Customer & Corporate Development Officer	Best Entertainment Special
8	Pierre Png	Introduced When Duty Calls S2 Series
9	Richie Koh	Introduced Your World in Mine Series
10	Lee Wei Song	Best Theme Song
11	Qi Yuwu	Introduced Dark Angel Series
12	Chen Hanwei; Xiang Yun; Pierre Png; Richie Koh; Qi Yuwu	Invited up on stage by Hazelle Teo and Dennis Chew to present Best Drama Series
Star Awards 2023 - Main Ceremony
Order	Presenter	Award/Role(s)
1	Lee Teng; Matilda Tao	Opening Monologue
2	Lee Teng; Matilda Tao	Most Popular Rising Star
3	Lee Teng; Matilda Tao	Best Rising Star
4	Lee Teng; Matilda Tao	Best Evergreen Artiste
5	Xiang Yun	Young Talent Award
6	Chen Hanwei; Xiang Yun	Introduce Best Supporting Role
7	Herman Keh	Announce Best Supporting Actor Winner
8	Jeanette Aw; Fann Wong; Zoe Tay; Huang Biren; Joanne Peh	Top 10 Male Artiste
9	Jam Hsiao	Top 10 Female Artiste
10	Sammi Cheng	Best Actor & Actress

Performers
Star Awards 2023 - Industry Achievement Awards (March 30, 2023)
Name(s)	Role
Kele; Daryl Ann	Performed Love at First Bite Theme Song
Kiki Lim; Tasha Low	Performed Genie in a Cup Theme Song
Ze Liang; Gao Meigui; AWWA Kids	Performed You Can Be An Angel S4 Theme Song
Benjamin Tan; Edwin Goh	Performed When Duty Calls S2 Theme Song
Juin Teh; Seow Sinee; Jernelle Oh	Performed Your World in Mine Theme Song
Star Awards 2023 - Main
Most Popular Rising Star Nominees	Performed 《Start It》
Best Evergreen Artiste Nominees	Performed 《夜空中最亮的星》
Rebecca Lim; Felicia Chin	Performed 《Thousand Hands》
Jam Hsiao	Performed 《皮囊》《王妃》 《只能想念你》《好想对你说》
Sammi Cheng	Performed《恰似你的温柔》

== Ceremony information ==
The ceremony had broken several traditions in the past, as some Professional award categories were presented on 30 March, 11 days prior to the main award ceremony. Like in a statement issued by Mediacorp, the ceremony follows a hybrid between ceremony and concert to emphasize the entertainment industry, hence the move of some of the awards during the actual day. On 9 March, the hosts were announced while the guest performers include Jam Hsiao and Sammi Cheng.

The Best Newcomer award was renamed to "Best Rising Star" (最佳潜力星), and a new voting award named "Most Popular Rising Star Award" (最受欢迎潜力星), along with similar eligibility requirements for the Top 10 Most Popular Artistes, aimed for artistes with no more than five years of career experience (as of 1 January 2022) was introduced. The criteria for the "All-Time Favourite Artiste" was also modified such that wins for the "Most Popular Rising Star Award" will count towards the cumulative total of 10 needed to be conferred the "All-Time Favourite Artiste" award. The Top 10 Most Popular Artistes also had an unlimited number of nominations along with similar criteria of the former, with artistes of at least five years of experience.

The Best Short-Form Drama Series 最佳短篇戏剧, "Perfect Combo 最合拍搭档" and "Most Attention Seeking New-gen Host 最强镜新晋主持人", was not presented this year.

=== Top 10 Most Popular Artistes nomination and controversy ===
The revisions to the Top 10 Most Popular Category have aroused controversy because the category will no longer be limited to its regular 20 Male and Female performers; instead, the category will nominate every artist who had contributed to Singaporean television in the past year. The rules and conditions for this year's Top 10 Most Popular Artistes award were extensively open to people who had contributed not only in Mediacorp Television, but also in Mediacorp Radio Broadcasting. Anyone with more than five years of experience in screen acting and/or screen/audio hosting as of January 1, 2022 and who meets at least one of the following requirements is eligible:

- In at least one eligible programme and had played the lead or were the major host.
- In at least three eligible programmes and had played a supporting part or hosted an episode.
- Appears in 30 episodes across all eligible programmes.

=== New regulations conceal vulnerabilities ===
Artistes that have only appeared in one drama series as a lead role may also be nominated in this category. Examples include "Sisters Stand Tall", with Malaysian actress "Jojo Goh" and Chinese actress "Jin Meng Yang Zi" being nominated for the Top 10 Most Popular Artistes Award as well, despite not being contracted under Mediacorp. Most of the Top 10 Most Popular Artistes Awards nominees were radio DJs as well, as they can be nominated just by being the host of an eligible radio programme. However, DJ "Kimberly Wang" from English radio station 987FM was also nominated for this category.
