= List of drama serials with all four Star Awards acting nominations =

This is a list of drama serials with performances that have been nominated in all of the Star Awards acting categories.

The list of all the drama series in which Mediacorp annually bestows Star Awards for acting performances in the following four categories: Best Actor, Best Actress, Best Supporting Actor, and Best Supporting Actress.

Only two drama series have won all five of the major awards: Holland V (2003), The Dream Makers (season 2) (2016). Five drama series films failed to win any of the five major awards after being nominated.

== Drama serials ==
As of 2026, there have been 30 drama serials containing at least one nominated performance in each of the four Star Awards acting categories. For the purpose of the article, dramas with nominations of all five awards will be listed here.

Award winners are listed in bold with green background; others listed are nominees who did not win. The winners will be listed first in bold, followed by nominees in stage surnames.

| Year | Name of Drama | Best Actor | Best Actress | Best Supporting Actor | Best Supporting Actress |
|---|---|---|---|---|---|
| 1997 | **The Price of Peace** | **Christopher Lee** / James Lye | **Carole Lin** | Chen Guohua / Chen Shucheng | **Hong Huifang** |
| 1998 | The New Adventures of Wisely | Li Nanxing | Zoe Tay | Lin Yisheng 林益盛 | Kym Ng |
| 1998 | The Return of the Condor Heroes | Christopher Lee | Fann Wong | Zheng Geping | Yvonne Lim |
| 1999 | **Stepping Out** | **Xie Shaoguang** / Terence Cao | **Cynthia Koh 许美珍** / Ivy Lee | **Tay Ping Hui** / Chunyu Shanshan 淳于珊珊 | Chen Huihui / Yvonne Lim |
| 2000 | **Hainan Kopi Tales** | **Chew Chor Meng** | Lin Meijiao | Vincent Ng / Yao Wenlong | Chen Huihui |
| 2000 | My Home Affairs 家事 | Tay Ping Hui | Zoe Tay | **Chen Guohua** | **Xiang Yun** |
| 2001 | **Three Women and A Half** | Huang Wenyong | **Aileen Tan** / Huang Biren | Nick Shen / Rayson Tan | Lin Meijiao |
| 2003 | **Holland V** | **Xie Shaoguang** | **Chen Liping** / Jeanette Aw | **Huang Yiliang** / Huang Wenyong / Jeff Wang / Yao Wenlong | **Patricia Mok** / Xiang Yun |
| 2004 | Double Happiness (season 1) | **Xie Shaoguang** | **Ivy Lee** / Xiang Yun | Jeff Wang | Hong Huifang / Vivian Lai |
| 2005 | Portrait of Home | Adrian Pang | Cynthia Koh | **Cavin Soh** | **Yvonne Lim** / Jesseca Liu |
| 2007 | Like Father, Like Daughter | **Zheng Geping** | Joanne Peh | Nick Shen | Jacqueline Sue 徐艳玲 |
| 2007 | Mars vs Venus | Tay Ping Hui | Huang Biren | Cavin Soh | **May Phua** |
| 2009 | The Golden Path | Tay Ping Hui | Chen Liping / Felicia Chin | **Chew Chor Meng** | Wayne Chua 蔡佩璇 |
| 2009 | **The Little Nyonya** | Pierre Png / Qi Yuwu | **Joanne Peh** / Jeanette Aw | Zen Chong / Dai Xiangyu / Darren Lim / Yao Wenlong | **Ng Hui** / **Xiang Yun** / Eelyn Kok / Li Yinzhu 李茵珠 / Lin Meijiao |
| 2010 | **Together** | Dai Xiangyu / Elvin Ng | Jeanette Aw / Eelyn Kok | Zhang Zhenxuan / Zheng Geping | Hong Huifang / Aileen Tan |
| 2011 | **Breakout** | Christopher Lee / Elvin Ng | Jeanette Aw / Zhou Ying | Darren Lim | **Pan Lingling** / Lin Meijiao |
| 2013 | **Pillow Talk** | Thomas Ong / Pierre Png | Joanne Peh | Zhu Houren | Xiang Yun |
| 2014 | **The Dream Makers (season 1)** | Chen Hanwei / Qi Yuwu | **Chen Liping** / Jeanette Aw / Rui En | **Guo Liang** / Shaun Chen / Dennis Chew | **Rebecca Lim** |
| 2015 | Against the Tide | Christopher Lee | Rui En | Aloysius Pang / Zhang Zhenxuan | Paige Chua |
| 2015 | **The Journey: Tumultuous Times** | **Shaun Chen** | Felicia Chin | **Chen Hanwei** | **Joanne Peh** / Carrie Wong |
| 2016 | 118 | Chen Hanwei | Ya Hui | Chen Tianwen | Sheila Sim / Carrie Wong |
| 2016 | **The Dream Makers (season 2)** | **Qi Yuwu** / Romeo Tan | **Jeanette Aw** / Rui En / Zoe Tay | **Zhang Zhenxuan** / Edwin Goh 吴劲威 | **Julie Tan** |
| 2017 | **Hero** | Shaun Chen | Jesseca Liu | Andie Chen | **Aileen Tan** / Paige Chua / Bonnie Loo / Pan Lingling |
| 2019 | A Million Dollar Dream | **Chen Hanwei** | **Zoe Tay** | **Chen Shucheng** | He Ying Ying |
| 2022 | **My Star Bride** | Xu Bin | Chantalle Ng | Zhu Houren | **Lin Meijiao** / Cynthia Koh |
| 2023 | Dark Angel | Qi Yuwu | Zoe Tay | **Brandon Wong** / Chew Chor Meng | Aileen Tan |
| 2023 | **Your World in Mine** | **Richie Koh** / Desmond Ng | **Huang Biren** / Hong Ling | Zhu Houren | **Xiang Yun** / Lina Ng |
| 2024 | Cash on Delivery | Richie Koh | Jernelle Oh | Peter Yu | Jin Yinji |
| 2025 | Kill Sera Sera | **Christopher Lee** | **Jessica Hsuan** | Xu Bin | Lynn Lim 林绿 |
| 2026 | **Emerald Hill - The Little Nyonya Story** | Romeo Tan | **Jesseca Liu** / Tasha Low / Chantalle Ng | **Tyler Ten** / Zhang Ze Tong | **Chen Liping** / Jojo Goh 吴俐璇 / Dawn Yeoh |

== Superlatives ==
The list of drama series that have the following results:

| Type | Count | Name (in alphabetical order) |
|---|---|---|
| Swept all five categories | 2 | The Dream Makers (season 2); Holland V |
| Won all four acting categories without winning Best Drama Serial | 0 | None |
| Won Drama Serial but did not win any acting categories | 2 | Pillow Talk; Together |
| Nominated on all categories but did not win any | 5 | 118; Against the Tide; Cash on Delivery; The New Adventures of Wisely; The Return of the Condor Heroes |

42 performers were nominated for their work in multiple different drama serials that received nominations in all acting categories:

| Performer | Wins | Nominations |
|---|---|---|
| Xiang Yun | 3 | 6 |
| Chen Liping | 3 | 4 |
| Xie Shaoguang | 3 | 3 |
| Chen Hanwei | 2 | 4 |
| Joanne Peh | 2 | 4 |
| Aileen Tan | 2 | 4 |
| Chew Chor Meng | 2 | 3 |
| Jeanette Aw | 1 | 6 |
| Lin Meijiao | 1 | 5 |
| Zoe Tay | 1 | 5 |
| Christopher Lee | 1 | 4 |
| Qi Yuwu | 1 | 4 |
| Tay Ping Hui | 1 | 4 |
| Shaun Chen | 1 | 3 |
| Hong Huifang | 1 | 3 |
| Huang Biren | 1 | 3 |
| Cynthia Koh | 1 | 3 |
| Jesseca Liu | 1 | 3 |
| Yvonne Lim | 1 | 3 |
| Zhang Zhenxuan | 1 | 3 |
| Zheng Geping | 1 | 3 |
| Chen Guohua | 1 | 2 |
| Chen Shucheng | 1 | 2 |
| Richie Koh | 1 | 2 |
| Ivy Lee | 1 | 2 |
| Pan Lingling | 1 | 2 |
| Cavin Soh | 1 | 2 |
| Rui En | 0 | 3 |
| Yao Wenlong | 0 | 3 |
| Zhu Houren | 0 | 3 |
| Chen Huihui | 0 | 2 |
| Felicia Chin | 0 | 2 |
| Paige Chua | 0 | 2 |
| Dai Xiangyu | 0 | 2 |
| Huang Wenyong | 0 | 2 |
| Eelyn Kok | 0 | 2 |
| Darren Lim | 0 | 2 |
| Elvin Ng | 0 | 2 |
| Pierre Png | 0 | 2 |
| Nick Shen | 0 | 2 |
| Jeff Wang | 0 | 2 |
| Carrie Wong | 0 | 2 |
