= Unforgivable (TV series) =

- Traditional Chinese: 不可饒恕的罪惡
- Simplified Chinese: 不可饶恕的罪恶
- Hanyu Pinyin: Bùkě ráoshù de zuì è
- Genre: Crime drama
- Written by: Alisia Pek Xue Ning; Ong Siew Sze
- Directed by: Chen Yiyou; Zhang Hui Ying
- Starring: Jesseca Liu; Hong Ling; Shane Pow; Brandon Wong; Gavin Teo
- Country of origin: Singapore
- Original language: Mandarin
- No. of episodes: Two versions; PG: 18; M18: 20

Production
- Producer: Doreen Yap
- Running time: approx. 45 minutes

Original release
- Network: MediaCorp TV Channel 8 Mewatch
- Release: 2024 – 2024

Unforgivable (Chinese: 不可饶恕的罪恶) is a 2024 Singaporean crime drama series starring Jesseca Liu, Hong Ling, Shane Pow, Brandon Wong and Gavin Teo.

As the series contains some relatively explicit scenes and dialogue, it was released in two versions: an M18 version and a PG version.

Both versions of the series debuted on 23 September 2024 on Mewatch. From 24 September 2024, the PG version was aired on weekdays at 9 pm on Mediacorp Channel 8.

It had received the most number of nominations and awards in Star Awards 2025.

== Plot ==
The drama focuses on the Sexual Offence Department within the Singapore Police Force. The department is headed by a passionate detective named Gao Shuya, who has a troubled past, whose leadership is tested as the team confronts many challenging cases.

Shuya's team consists of Guan Lin, who is influenced by her family's struggles; Lin Yifan, who is passionate about human rights; and Li Junhao, who is an investigator struggling with internal challenges.

In their mission for justice, the unit is not only challenged by the process that comes with dealing with traumatic cases but also by living up to societal expectations daily. The presence of a villain referred to as the “Werewolf,” a serial rapist, also tests the limits of the unit, making them confront the effects of crime on the victims and the law enforcers.

== Cast ==
- Jesseca Liu as Gao Shuya
- Hong Ling as Guan Lin
- Brandon Wong as Chen Fengyuan / 55
- Shane Pow as Lin Yifan
- Gavin Teo as Li Junhao
- Brian Ng as Kuang Weiliang
- Zhu Houren as Wu Yingqiu
- Xiang Yun as Jackie
- Pierre Png as Zhang Chenyi
- Chen Shucheng as Gao Guangsheng
- Pan Lingling as Wang Jinxiang
- Jernelle Oh as Hu Shujuan
- Chen Hanwei as Chen Yongren
- Tyler Ten as Guo Wenhao
- Juin Teh as Young Jinxiang

== Accolades ==
Organisation	Year	Category	Nominee(s)	Result	Ref
ContentAsia Awards	2025	Best Supporting Actor	Chen Shucheng	Won	
ContentAsia Awards	2025	Best Supporting Actress	Pan Lingling	Nominated	
Star Awards	2025	Best Actress	Jesseca Liu	Nominated	
Star Awards	2025	Best Actress	Hong Ling	Nominated	
Star Awards	2025	Best Supporting Actor	Chen Hanwei	Won	
Star Awards	2025	Best Supporting Actor	Chen Shucheng	Nominated	
Star Awards	2025	Best Drama Serial	—N/a	Won	
Star Awards	2025	Best Theme Song	"Wound" by Xie Xinni	Nominated	
Star Awards	2025	Best Rising Star	Tyler Ten	Won	
Star Awards	2025	Best Rising Star	Juin Teh	Nominated	
Star Awards	2025	Young Talent	Charlotte Chen	Nominated	
Star Awards	2025	Young Talent	Elvis Shi	Nominated	
