= Kiki Lim =

Singaporean actress (born 2002)

- Lim in 2021
- Born: 28 March 2002 (age 24); Singapore
- Other name: Lin Zhaoting
- Education: Shuqun Secondary School
- Alma mater: ITE College West
- Occupations: Actress; singer; model; TikTok personality; dancer
- Years active: 2011–present
- Musical career
- Genre: Pop
- Instrument: Vocals

Chinese name
- Traditional Chinese: 林昭婷
- Simplified Chinese: 林昭婷
- Hanyu Pinyin: Lín Zhāotíng

Kiki Lim Jiow Ting (born 28 March 2002) is a Singaporean actress and singer.

== Early life and career ==
Lim has a brother who is eight years older. Her mother is a housewife and her father is a bus driver. Lim accredited her mother for cultivating her interest in performing since young, after finding out that Lim had a talent for singing when she was three. Lim's mother accompanied her to take part in various singing, dancing and storytelling competitions and Lim developed a passion for the entertainment industry in the process. At the age of 7, Lim was one of the dancers at Hong Kong star Aaron Kwok's concert in Singapore.

Lim began acting when she was 11, with a leading role in Channel 8 children's drama Little Detective. The following year in 2014, she appeared in the Okto series Wizard of Honey Street, as well as in the Suria series A&E .

Lim has also appeared in ads for KFC Breakfast in 2011, Nickelodeon's anti bullying campaign in 2014 and a commercial for Cathay Cineplex in 2018.

Lim took a hiatus from acting for four to five years to concentrate on her studies, attending an Institute of Technical Education, majoring in business. In 2016, Lim was cast in the English-language long-form drama Tanglin.

In 2018, she took part in Huayi Brothers Icon Search, a large-scale talent competition in China. In 2019, Lim participated in the 11th edition of Mediacorp's Star Search and emerged as one of the Top 12 finalists.

She has since gone on to appear in multiple Mediacorp drama series including Last Madame (2019), All Around You (2020), A Jungle Survivor (2020) and Live Your Dreams (2021).

2022 saw Lim appearing in five Channel 8 drama series including Home Again, When Duty Calls 2, Dark Angel, Soul Doctor and Healing Heroes.

Lim's other starring roles included Strike Gold (2023), Family Ties (2023) and Kill Sera Sera (2024).

== Filmography ==
Lim has appeared in the following shows and films:

=== Television series ===
Year	Title	Role	Notes	Ref.
2012	Jump!			
2013	Little Detective	Zhi Xi	Channel 8 children series also known as "A Boy Awakening"	
2014	Wizard of Honey Street		Okto series	
2014	A&E		Suria series	
2016–2017	Tanglin			
2018	Lion Mums 3	Kylie Sng		
2019	Tribes	Kylie Sng	"Lion Mums" Spin-off	
2019	Last Madame	Mui Gwai		
2019	Fresh Take – Pei Pei	Pei Pei		
2020	All Around You	Han Fengling		
2020	Fresh Take 2 – Miss Haven't	Huang Cai Ting		
2020	A Jungle Survivor	Tammy		
2021	All That Jess	Katie		
2021	Live Your Dreams	Breena Yip		
2021	The Heartland Hero	Young Qingtian		
2022	Home Again	Mia		
2022	When Duty Calls 2	Wu Guanlin		
2022	Dark Angel	Lin You Xuan		
2022	Soul Doctor	Liu Min Min		
2022	Healing Heroes	Lin Yunxi		
2023	Strike Gold	Mei Xiao Xiao		
2023	Family Ties	Zizi		
2023	Stranger in the Dark	Gu Mei		
2024	Kill Sera Sera	Zhang Ting Ting		
2024	To Be Loved	Liao An Xin		
2024	Unforgivable	Felicia Toh	Only appear on M18 version	
2025	Emerald Hill - The Little Nyonya Story	Ah Ju		

=== Film ===
Year	Title	Role	Notes	Ref.
2016	LTA Short Film Journey		Short	
2022	Deleted			

=== Variety show ===
- Catch of the Day (2011; Channel 5)

== Discography ==
=== Extended plays ===
Year	Title	Notes/Ref.
2021	Vol.1	
2021	Covers by K.	

=== Singles ===
Year	Song title	Notes/Ref.
2020	"Xin Nian Dao"	MediaCorp Music Lunar New Year Album 21
2021	"The Only Exception"	
2021	"Starry Sky Silhouette"	
2023	"Ni Wo Zhi Jian"	Family Ties soundtrack

== Awards and nominations ==
Year	Award	Category	Nominated work	Result	Ref.
2023	Star Awards	Best Rising Star	When Duty Calls 2	Nominated	
2023	Star Awards	Top 3 Most Popular Rising Stars	—N/a	Nominated	
2024	Star Awards	Top 3 Most Popular Rising Stars	—N/a	Nominated	
2025	Star Awards	Top 3 Most Popular Rising Stars	—N/a	Nominated	
