= Seow Sin Nee =

Malaysian host and actress (born 1995)

- Born: 6 September 1995 (age 31); Johor Bahru, Malaysia
- Other name: Xiao Xinni
- Education: Bukit Panjang Government High School
- Alma mater: University of Western Australia
- Occupations: Host; actress; radio DJ
- Years active: 2019–present
- Musical career
- Member of: 4567

Chinese name
- Traditional Chinese: 蕭歆霓
- Simplified Chinese: 萧歆霓
- Hanyu Pinyin: Xiāo Xīnní

Seow Sin Nee (born 6 September 1995) is a Malaysian host, actress and radio DJ who made her debut through the Mediacorp radio DJ talent competition, The Sound Makers, in 2019.

== Early life and education ==
Seow was born in Johor Bahru, Malaysia and graduated from the University of Western Australia in 2016. She spent her adolescent years in Singapore and attended Bukit Panjang Government High School.

== Career ==
Seow later went on to win the Channel 8 talent search competition, Beyond The Camera. Since then, she has appeared as a host on various shows, including the bite-sized infotainment series #JustSwipeLah and The Sheng Siong Show. She has also been cast in a number of television series, including Your World in Mine (2022) and Fix My Life (2023), and is a member of the group "4567", created by Mediacorp's artiste management arm The Celebrity Agency, along with Jernelle Oh, Juin Teh and Gini Chang.

== Filmography ==
Seow has appeared in the following programmes:

=== Television series ===
- The Unbreakable Bond (2022)
- Your World in Mine (2022)
- Mr Zhou's Ghost Stories@Job Haunting (2022)
- I'm Actor Ah De (2022)
- Fix My Life (2023)
- The Sky is Still Blue (2023)
- Whatever Will Be, Will Be (2023)
- Stranger in the Dark (2023)
- Emerald Hill - The Little Nyonya Story (2025)

=== Variety show ===
- Hawker Academy (2020)
- The Sheng Siong Show (2020-22)
- Job Well Done (2021)
- Little Food Hunter (2021)
- #JustSwipeLah (2021–present; web series)
- Star Awards 2022 Backstage Live (2022)
- Silver Carnival (2022–present)
- The Star Athlete (2023)
- 4567 JB Makan Lobang (2023; web series)
- Pasar Malam Stars (2023)

== Discography ==
=== Compilation albums ===
Year	English title	Mandarin title	Ref
2022	MediaCorp Music Lunar New Year Album 22	新传媒群星旺虎泰哥迎春乐	

== Awards and nominations ==
Year	Award	Category	Nominated work	Result	Ref
2021	Star Awards	Best Newcomer	Hawker Academy	Nominated	
2022	Star Awards	My Pick! Most Attention Seeking New-Gen Host	#JustSwipeLah	Nominated	
2023	Star Awards	Top 3 Most Popular Rising Stars	—N/a	Nominated	
2024	Star Awards	Top 3 Most Popular Rising Stars	—N/a	Nominated	
2025	Star Awards	Top 3 Most Popular Rising Stars	—N/a	Nominated	
