= Star Awards 2026 =

Singaporean television award ceremony

Star Awards 2026 红星大奖2026
- Date: 19 April 2026 (Main Ceremony)
- Location: MES Theatre @ Mediacorp
- Country: Singapore
- Hosted by: Main show: Guo Liang; Zhang Ze Tong; Cheryl Chou; Walk of Fame: Jeremy Chan; Lee Teng; Hazelle Teo; Germaine Tan; Backstage: Jeff Goh; Chen Ning; Gao Meigui; Chen Qijia; Lin Pingjuan

Highlights
- Most awards: Emerald Hill - The Little Nyonya Story (6)
- Most nominations: Emerald Hill - The Little Nyonya Story (17)
- Formal Awards: All-time Favourite Artiste: Carrie Wong; Romeo Tan

Television/radio coverage
- Network: Astro AEC; Astro GO; Mediacorp Channel 8 Mediacorp Channel U mewatch YouTube
- Runtime: Awards Ceremony: 182 mins Walk-of-fame: 87 mins

Star Awards 2026 is an annual awards ceremony celebrating excellence in television and media. The 2026 ceremony is themed "Born to Glow", marking a conceptual shift from commemorating milestones to honoring the origins of creativity and the process behind artistic achievement.

Emerald Hill - The Little Nyonya Story, who led the award with 17 nominations, won the most awards in the ceremony with six, including Best Drama Serial and three of four acting categories; the only acting category that did not win was the Best Actor, which went to Desmond Tan for his role for Devil Behind the Gate instead. Tan, alongside Best Programme Host Guo Liang, as well as Paige Chua and Ya Hui, won its tenth award for the Top 10 Most Favourite Artistes this year, alongside first-timers Nick Teo, Hazelle Teo and Juin Teh, the latter who also won her first Most Popular Rising Star.

== Background ==
The theme emphasizes the idea that every moment of brilliance begins with a spark — where intention, imagination, and effort converge. "Born" symbolizes the first stages of creation, including initial ideas, early drafts, rehearsals, and collaborative groundwork across various roles and disciplines. The ceremony highlights how these individual beginnings collectively build momentum and culminate in the on-screen "glow" experienced by audiences.

Star Awards 2026 recognises completed televised works, individual creative processes, and production efforts across all featured performances.

=== New award categories ===
A new award category, Best Microdrama, has been introduced this year, marking Mediacorp's inaugural venture into the bite-sized, mobile-first content format. Additionally, the Best Theme Song category has been rebranded as Best Original Song, allowing original sub-theme songs to be recognised alongside main theme songs.

=== Presenters and performers ===
On 31 March 2026, it was announced that a new hosting trio—featuring returning host Guo Liang alongside Zhang Ze Tong and Cheryl Chou—will take on roles at the Star Awards event.

=== Main ceremony ===
List of performers
Artist(s)	Song(s)
Luo Yunxi	Whispers of Fate OST《与你》

== Winners and nominees ==
Winners are listed first and highlighted in boldface.

‡ The award is presented to the producer(s) of the drama or programme.

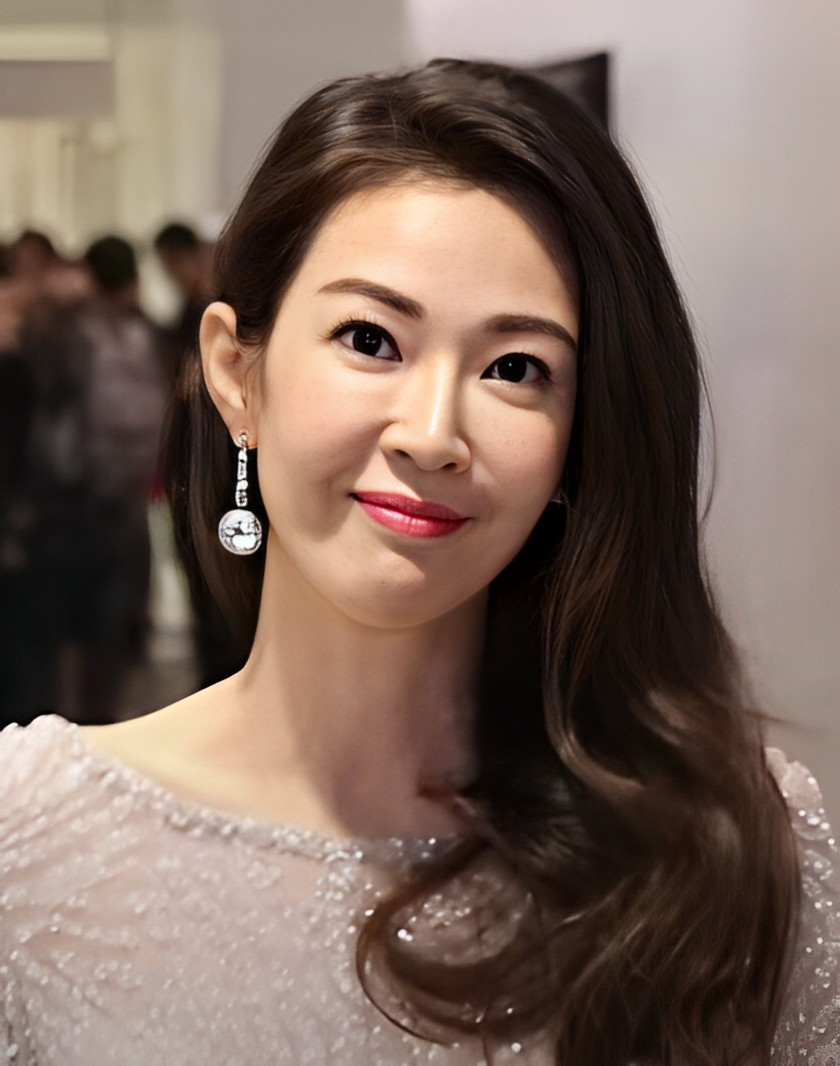
Jesseca Liu, Best Actress Winner

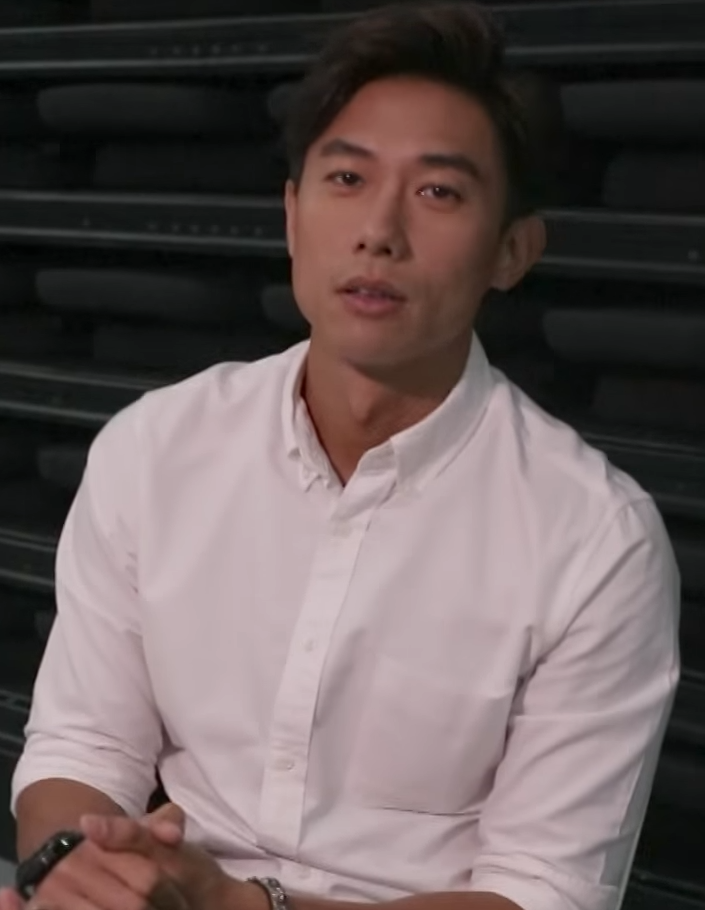
Desmond Tan, Best Actor Winner

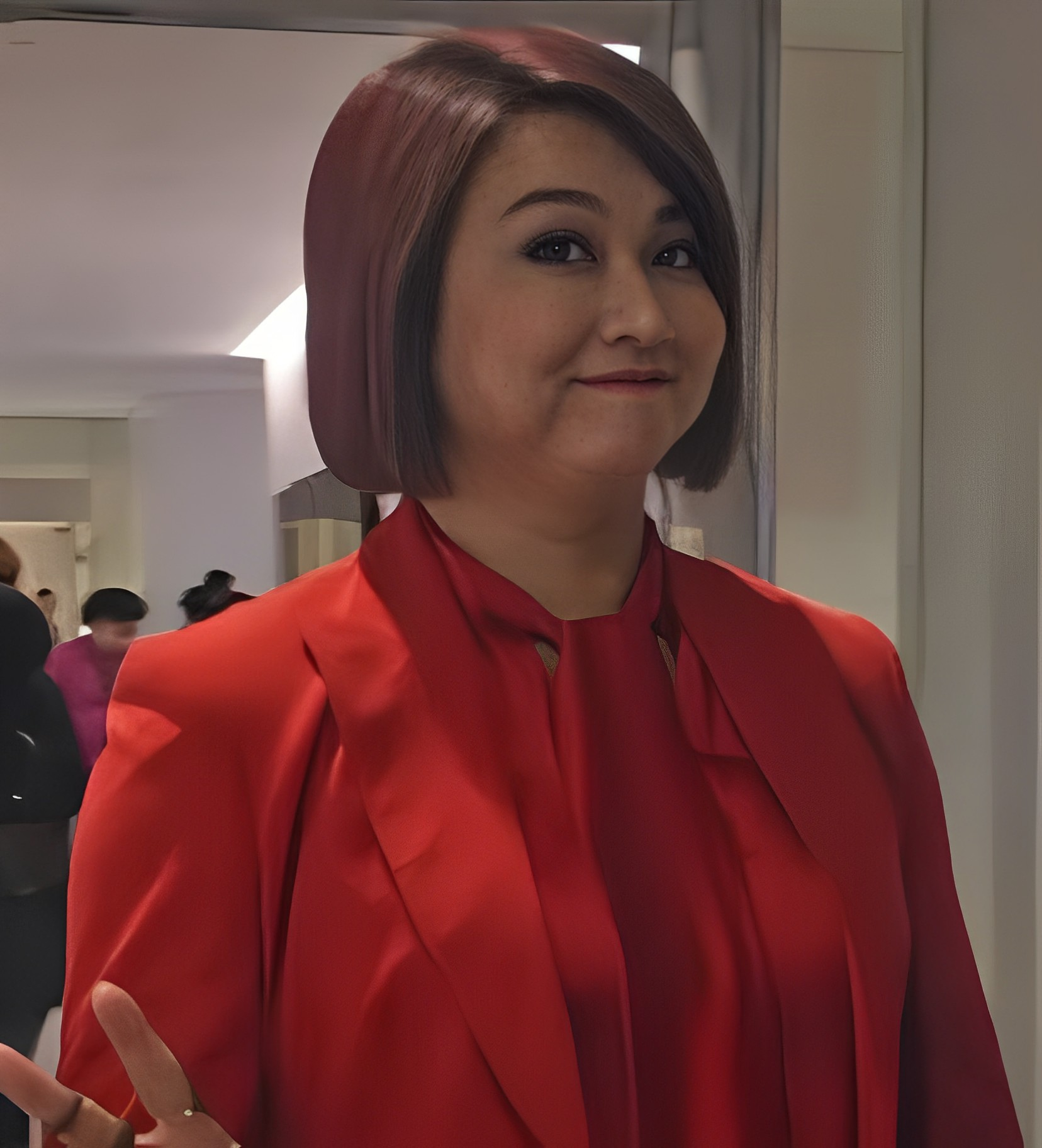
Chen Liping, Best Supporting Actress Winner

Best Actor Presented By: Julian Cheung	Best Actress Presented By: Julian Cheung
**Desmond Tan / Devil Behind The Gate**: Chen Hanwei / The Gift of Time; Richie Koh / Another Wok of Life; Romeo Tan / Emerald Hill - The Little Nyonya Story; Xu Bin / Fixing Fate	**Jesseca Liu / Emerald Hill - The Little Nyonya Story**: Chantalle Ng / Emerald Hill - The Little Nyonya Story; Cheryl Chou / Perfectly Imperfect; Hong Ling / The Spirit Hunter; Tasha Low / Emerald Hill - The Little Nyonya Story
Best Supporting Actor Presented By: Hsieh Ying Xuan	Best Supporting Actress Presented By: Hsieh Ying Xuan
**Tyler Ten / Emerald Hill - The Little Nyonya Story**: Andie Chen / Fixing Fate; James Seah / Another Wok of Life; Jeremy Chan / Another Wok of Life; Zhang Zetong / Emerald Hill - The Little Nyonya Story	**Chen Liping / Emerald Hill - The Little Nyonya Story**: Cynthia Koh / I Believe I Can Fly; Dawn Yeoh / Emerald Hill - The Little Nyonya Story; Jojo Goh / Emerald Hill - The Little Nyonya Story; Xiang Yun / The Gift of Time
Young Talent Award Presented By: Chen Shucheng, Zhu Houren, Richard Low	Best Rising Star Presented By: Angie Chai
**Ivory Chia / Emerald Hill - The Little Nyonya Story**: Alfred Ong / Devil Behind The Gate; Asher Tay / Emerald Hill - The Little Nyonya Story; Ayden Chew / Emerald Hill - The Little Nyonya Story; Charlotte Yue / Emerald Hill - The Little Nyonya Story	**Gladys Bay / Under The Net**: Cai Cheng Jun / Under The Net; Gladys Ng / Under The Net; Tan Ting Fong / YES 933 Comedy Series; Zhu Zeliang / Emerald Hill - The Little Nyonya Story
Best Audio Personality Presented By: Lee Weisong, Lee Sisong	Best Programme Host Presented By: Kevin Tsai
**Dennis Chew / LOVE 972 Mr. Zhou's Ghost Stories**: Lin Lingzhi / CAPITAL 958 Double-O-7; Pan Jia Biao / CAPITAL 958 Wake Up Call; Kenneth Chung / YES 933 The Shuang, Kunz, Jia Trio; Zhu Zeliang / YES 933 The Night is Still Young	**Guo Liang / Star Awards 2025 Award Ceremony**: Bryan Wong / Makan On Wheels S2; Darren Lim / Unusual Weddings; Dennis Chew / Mr Zhou's Ghost Stories @ Singapore Sightings S2; Xixi Lim / Say It Right! S2
Best Entertainment Programme Presented By: Kevin Tsai	Best Infotainment Programme Presented By: Kevin Tsai
**Emerald Hill - Our Hillside Moments ‡**: Camping Around The World; Makan On Wheels S2; Mr Zhou's Ghost Stories @ Singapore Sightings S2; Murder on the Menu	**Pedal On For Love ‡**: Find Me A Singaporean : The World's My Stage; Forbidding No More S3; The Indigenous; Unusual Weddings
Best Radio Programme Presented By: Lee Weisong, Lee Sisong	Best Original Song Presented By: Billy Koh
**LOVE 972 - The Breakfast Quartet ‡**: LOVE 972 - The FENtastic Show; YES 933 - The Night is Still Young; YES 933 - The Shuang, Kunz, Jia Trio; YES 933 - The DAKA Show	**"Echoes of Petals"** (落花如雨) **/ Emerald Hill - The Little Nyonya Story ‡**: "Gui Ling" (归零) / Another Wok of Life; "I Believe I Can Fly - Uncle Still Got It" (青春小鸟) / I Believe I Can Fly; "Thief of Fate" (命运小偷) / Fixing Fate; "Yi Jian Shi Jian" (一剑世间) / The Spirit Hunter
Best Short-Form Entertainment Programme Presented By: Luo Yunxi	Best Microdrama Presented By: Luo Yunxi
**YES 933 Comedy Series ‡**: Chinese? I Cannot!; Fans Ask Celebs Spill; #Justswipelah; The DAKA Show S4	**Woke Up In The 60s In My Grandma's Apron ‡**: Falling For The CEO's Son; I Became A Miracle Doctor In Kampong; Love Revenge; Who Did My Ah Ma Kill
Best Drama Serial Presented By: Bowie Lam
**Emerald Hill - The Little Nyonya Story ‡**: Another Wok of Life; Fixing Fate; I Believe I Can Fly; The Gift of Time

=== Multiple nominations and awards ===
Nomination	Drama
17	Emerald Hill - The Little Nyonya Story
5	Another Wok of Life
4	Fixing Fate
3	I Believe I Can Fly
3	The Gift of Time
3	Under The Net
2	The Spirit Hunter
Nomination	Programme
2	The Shuang, Kunz, Jia Trio
2	The DAKA Show
2	Mr Zhou's Ghost Stories @ Singapore Sightings S2
2	Unusual Weddings
2	Makan On Wheels S2

Drama with multiple wins
Awards	Drama
6	Emerald Hill - The Little Nyonya Story

=== All-Time Favourite Artiste awards ===
Presented By: Baey Yam Keng
Minister of State for Culture, Community and Youth of Singapore

The All-Time Favourite Artiste award is given to celebrities who have won the Top 10 Most Popular category 10 times.

- Carrie Wong – "A remarkable milestone with ten consecutive years of wins in the Popularity Awards category. Her sustained success reflects consistent audience recognition and appreciation for her work and dedication."
- Romeo Tan – "A consecutive winning streak in the Popularity Awards category beginning in 2017 and concluding in 2025 with his first award in 2014. His sustained recognition over more than a decade reflects consistent audience support and enduring success."

== Voting awards ==
=== Rising Stars ===
The final results for the Most Popular Rising Stars will be determined by a combination of Popularity Survey (20%) and Public Voting (80%). Voting is open to all users with a valid meconnect account, is free of charge, and runs from 13 March 2026, 15:00 to 19 April 2026, 18:00. Each account may cast up to three votes per day, except on 19 April 2026 from 00:00 to 18:00, when unlimited voting is allowed.

Table key
3	Winner is promoted to Top 10 Awards at next ceremony

Most Popular Rising Stars
Presented By: Liu Yi-Hao; Award winner audited by PwC Singapore
Winners	No. of awards
Tyler Ten	2
Juin Teh	1
Zhang Zetong	3

=== Top 10 Popularity Awards ===
Table key
10	Winner of 10th award to be named All-Time Favourite Artiste at next ceremony

The final results for the Top 10 Most Popular Male and Female Artistes will be determined by a combination of Popularity Survey (20%) and Public Voting (80%). Voting is open to all users with a valid meconnect account, free of charge, and runs from 13 March 2026, 15:00 to 19 April 2026, 19:30. Each account can cast up to 10 votes per day for each award category, except on 19 April 2026 from 00:00 to 19:30, when unlimited voting is allowed for each category. The results were announced at the Star Awards 2026 Awards Ceremony on 19 April 2026.

Top 10 Most Popular; Male Artistes
Presented By: Ada Choi
Winners	No. of awards
Marcus Chin	6
Richie Koh	3
Benjamin Tan	3
Xu Bin	7
Nick Teo	1
Shaun Chen	8
Desmond Tan	10
Jeff Goh	4
Ayden Sng	4
Guo Liang	10

Top 10 Most Popular; Female Artistes
Presented By: Ada Choi
Winners	No. of awards
Chantalle Ng	5
Chen Biyu	4
Chen Ning	4
Denise Camillia Tan	3
Ya Hui	10
Gao Mei Gui	2
Tasha Low	4
Paige Chua	10
Hong Ling	5
Hazelle Teo	1

=== MYPICK! Award Categories ===
The results for the MYPICK! Awards will be determined solely by public voting (100%). Voting is open to all users with a valid meconnect account, free of charge, and runs from 13 March 2026, 15:00 and has ended on 31 March 2026, 23:59. Each account can cast one vote per day for each award category. The results were announced during Star Awards 2026 – Backstage Live.

The Show Stealer 最吸晴角色	Most Emotional Performance 最赚人热泪奖
Ivory Chua / Emerald Hill - The Little Nyonya Story: Chen Liping / Emerald Hill - The Little Nyonya Story; Chantalle Ng / Emerald Hill - The Little Nyonya Story; Jesseca Liu / Emerald Hill - The Little Nyonya Story; Asher Tay / Emerald Hill - The Little Nyonya Story	Jesseca Liu / Emerald Hill - The Little Nyonya Story: Chen Liping / Emerald Hill - The Little Nyonya Story; Chen Hanwei / The Gift of Time; Chantalle Ng / Emerald Hill - The Little Nyonya Story; Tasha Low / Emerald Hill - The Little Nyonya Story
Most Hated Villian 最讨人厌大反派	Favourite CP 最强CP
Chantalle Ng / Emerald Hill - The Little Nyonya Story: Andie Chen / Fixing Fate; Dawn Yeoh / Emerald Hill - The Little Nyonya Story; Shane Pow / Another Wok of Life; Romeo Tan / Emerald Hill - The Little Nyonya Story	Tasha Low and Zhang Zetong / Emerald Hill - The Little Nyonya Story: Jesseca Liu and Hsiu Chieh-Kai / Emerald Hill - The Little Nyonya Story; Dawn Yeoh and Romeo Tan / Emerald Hill - The Little Nyonya Story; Xiang Yun and Chen Hanwei / The Gift of Time; Tasha Low and Tyler Ten / Emerald Hill - The Little Nyonya Story

Drama that received multiple MY PICK! nominations
Nominations	Drama
16	Emerald Hill - The Little Nyonya Story
2	The Gift of Time

Drama with multiple wins
Awards	Drama
4	Emerald Hill - The Little Nyonya Story

=== BYD Award Categories ===
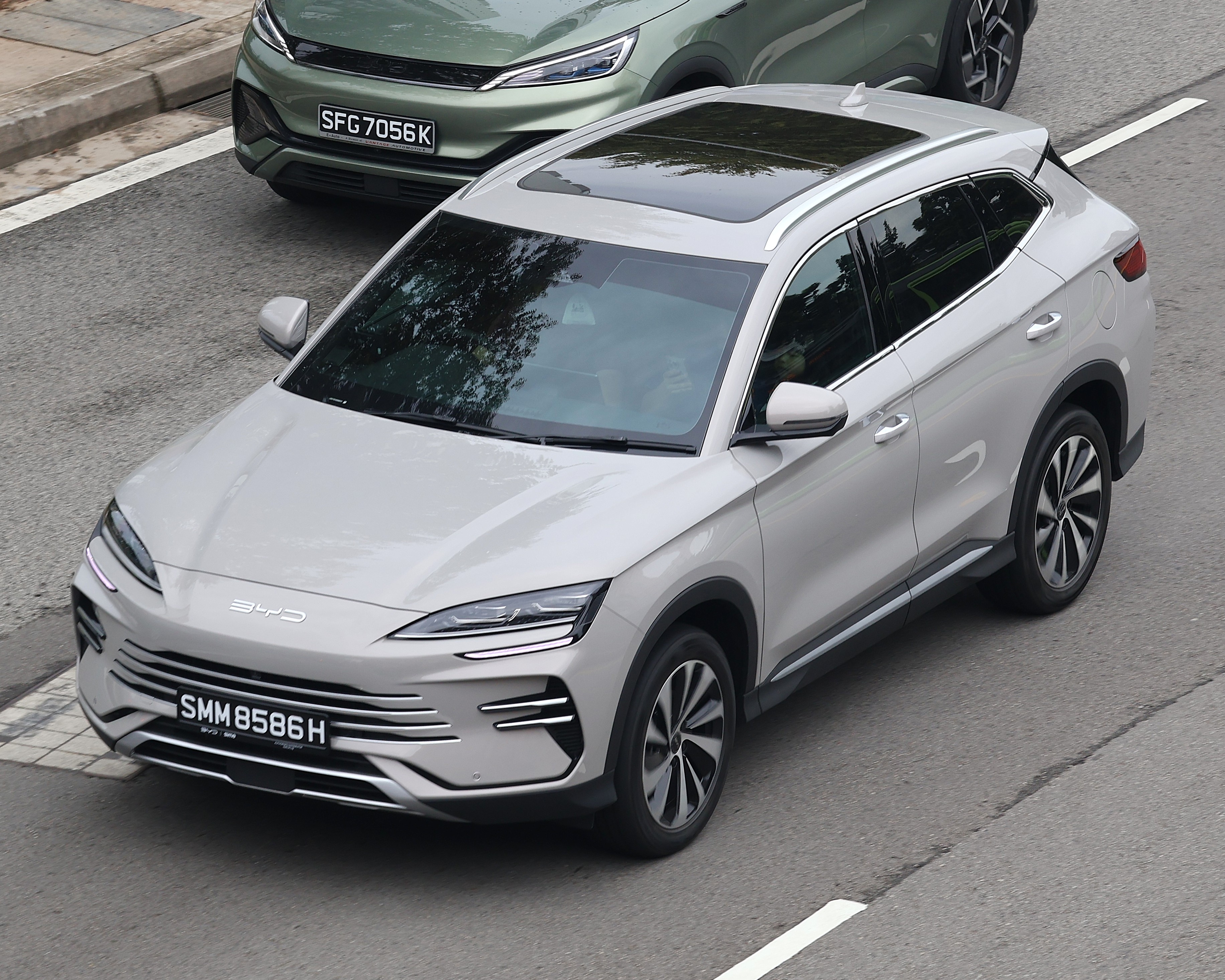
BYD Sealion 6 DM-i

Voters for the BYD Favourite Male and Female Character categories will be eligible to enter a lucky draw to be conducted by Mediacorp. The winner of the lucky draw will be announced during the show and will receive a BYD Sealion 6 DM-i. The two categories are 100% by public voting and opened for voting from 13 March to 31 March 2026. An unlimited voting period will be available on 19 April.

比亚迪最喜爱男角色 BYD Favourite Male Character Award	比亚迪最喜爱女角色 BYD Favourite Female Character Award
Desmond Tan / Devil Behind The Gate	Tasha Low / Emerald Hill - The Little Nyonya Story

=== Chan Brothers Award Categories ===
The final results for the Chan Brothers My Star Guide Award and Chan Brothers Favourite DJ Group will be determined 100% by public voting. Voting is open to all users with a valid meconnect account, free of charge, and runs from 13 March 2026, 15:00 and has ended on 31 March 2026, 23:59. Each account may cast one vote per day. The results were announced during the Star Awards 2026 – Walk of Fame and Backstage LIVE.

曾兄弟我的导游是红星奖 Chan Brothers My Star Guide Award	曾兄弟最喜爱DJ默契组合 Chan Brothers Favourite DJ Group
Dennis Chew: Feng Jian Bin; Kenneth Kong; Lin Lingzhi; Pan Jia Biao; Qiqi; Wallace Ang	YES 933 - The DAKA Show: CAPITAL 958 - CAPITAL Express; CAPITAL 958 - Wake Up Call; LOVE 972 - CCG Trio; LOVE 972 - Love Reigns; LOVE 972 - The Breakfast Quartet; YES 933 - High Noon; YES 933 - The Night Is Still Young; YES 933 - The Shuang, Kunz, Jia Trio

=== Award presented by Bioskin ===
The result were announced at the Star Awards 2026 – Walk Of Fame.

Bioskin Most Charismatic Artiste Award
Bioskin 魅力四射奖

Tyler Ten

- Denise Camillia Tan
- Ferlyn G
- Tasha Low
- Zhang Ze Tong

=== Interactive Category ===
The result were announced at the Star Awards 2026 – Backstage Live.

Best Dressed Female Artiste: Ya Hui
Best Dressed Male Artiste: Desmond Tan

== Judging Panels ==
=== Programme eligibility criteria ===
All entries for Star Awards 2026 must meet strict eligibility rules based on Mediacorp production, Chinese-language content, and a defined 2025 release window.

- Programme Eligibility: Only Chinese-language programmes produced/commissioned by Mediacorp and released between 1 Jan–31 Dec 2025 qualify, with rules on episode count (≥50% airing or ≥26 episodes for long-running shows).
- One-Time Qualification Rule: Each programme can qualify only once, even if its release spans across multiple years.
- Category-Specific Requirements: Special rules apply (e.g. original songs must have lyrics, short-form ≤20 mins, microdramas ≤3 mins, radio shows ≥60 mins weekly for 2 months).
- Performance Eligibility: Artistes must have lead/supporting roles or hosting duties (not guest), with stricter criteria for awards like Best Rising Star (≤5 years experience, no past nominations) and Young Talent (≤16 years old).

Members	Position
Alice Kwan	Veteran Journalist
Angeline Poh	Chief Customer and Corporate Development Officer, Mediacorp
Chang Long Jong	Former Deputy CEO of Mediacorp
Chew Wei Boon	Programme Director
Colin Goh	Managing Director
Cynthia Lim	Head, Production Resource
Danny Yeo	Founder
Elaine Chan	Theatre Composer, Arranger and Director
Eva Feng	Vice President
Hanes Chin	Head of Content
Jacky Chan	Hong Kong Media Veteran
Janine Stein	Editorial Director
Jesslyn Wong	Head of Content Distribution
Jim Lim	Multi Award-winning Songwriter, Producer, Music Arranger, Singer
Ken Wu	MC and Producer
Lee Hung Sheng	Head of Audience and Partnership
Lenny Leong	Senior Assistant Vice President
Lim Puay Keem	Head of Chinese Entertainment Production, Mediacorp
Mannson Yong	Assistant General Manager of Content
May-Yi Lee	Factual and Unscripted Production Unit Lead
Nan Zang	Vice President and Chief Editor
Nick Tai	Director of Brand Marketing and Public Relations, Talent Management, and Copyright Business
Oliver Chong	Head of Marketing and Communications, Mediacorp
Peter Choe	Founder and Chief Executive Officer
Sabanitha Shanmugasundram	Head of Commissioning and Community Engagement, Mediacorp
Simone Lum	Head of Growth and Audio，Mediacorp
Steven Ong	Head, English Production (Unscripted), Content, Mediacorp
Suzie Wang	Head, Commerce, Biz Dev and Emerging Biz, Mediacorp
Teo Eng Tiong	Course Chair
Timothy Oh	General Manager
