= Herman Keh =

Singaporean actor and host (born 1996)

- Born: 14 May 1996 (age 30); Singapore
- Education: LASALLE College of the Arts
- Occupations: Actor; host; TikTok personality; model; dancer
- Years active: 2019−present
- Musical career
- Member of: HST
- Modeling information
- Height: 1.9 m (6 ft 3 in)
- Hair color: Black
- Eye color: Dark Brown

Chinese name
- Traditional Chinese: 郭坤耀
- Simplified Chinese: 郭坤耀
- Hanyu Pinyin: Guō Kūnyào

Herman Keh (born 14 May 1996) is a Singaporean actor and host known for coming in second place in Star Search 2019 and for his roles in the television series I Want To Be A Towkay, Mind Jumper and Healing Heroes. He is also known for hosting the infotainment show Curious City.

== Early life ==
After completing his studies at a local junior college, Keh attended the LASALLE College of the Arts and graduated in 2020 with a Diploma in Dance.

== Career ==
He came in second place on Star Search in 2019, where he was complimented by Hong Kong star Carina Lau for “stealing the spotlight from everyone else”.

In 2020, he starred in the television series Mind Jumper, playing a genius hacker. He starred in the dialect drama series I Want To Be A Towkay in 2021. In 2022, he starred in the long-form medical drama series Healing Heroes.

In 2021, Mediacorp's artiste management arm The Celebrity Agency announced Keh, Zhai Siming and Tyler Ten as the team members of a new group named "HST".

Keh was signed to modelling agency NOW Model Management til 2022. He is also a TikTok personality who has accumulated more than 356.5K followers and 8.1 million "likes" to date.

== Filmography ==
=== Television series ===
| Year | Title | Role | Notes | Ref. |
|---|---|---|---|---|
| 2019 | All Around You | Han Fengjie | | |
| 2020 | Jungle Survivor | | | |
| 2020 | Mind Jumper | Xiao Wangzi | | |
| 2021 | I Want To Be A Towkay | Wang Yu | | |
| 2021 | Mr Zhou's Ghost Stories@Job Haunting | Tony | S1. Ep.4–5 | |
| 2021 | The Heartland Hero | | Guest | |
| 2021 | The Peculiar Pawnbroker | | | |
| 2022 | Healing Heroes | Pan Youxiao | | |
| 2022 | I'm Actor Ah De | | | |
| 2023 | I Do, Do I? | Kris | | |
| 2025 | Emerald Hill - The Little Nyonya Story | Zhang Yaoguang | | |
| 2026 | Kidnap Game | Tony Chan | | |

=== TV Hosting ===
| Year | Title | Notes | Ref. |
|---|---|---|---|
| 2021 | Just Swipe Lah | | |
| 2021 | Curious City | | |
| 2022 | Cyclepedia | | |
| 2022 | Star Awards Backstage Live | | |
| 2022 | Jiak Kan Tang | | |
| 2023 | Fake It Till You Make It | | |
| 2023 | Curious City 2 | | |
| 2023 | Makan On Wheels | | |
| 2023 | Foodie Trio | | |

=== Film ===
| Year | Title | Role | Notes | Ref. |
|---|---|---|---|---|
| 2023 | Of A Different Breed | Boon | Short film | |

== Discography ==
=== Compilation albums ===
| Year | English title | Mandarin title | Ref |
|---|---|---|---|
| 2021 | MediaCorp Music Lunar New Year Album 21 | 新传媒群星福满牛年Moo Moo 乐 | |
| 2022 | MediaCorp Music Lunar New Year Album 22 | 新传媒群星旺虎泰哥迎春乐 | |

== Awards and nominations ==
| Year | Award | Category | Nominated work | Result | Ref |
|---|---|---|---|---|---|
| 2021 | Star Awards | Best Newcomer | Interns' Survivor Guide | Nominated | |
| 2022 | Star Awards | Most Attention Seeking New-Gen Host | Curious City | Won | |
| 2022 | Star Awards | Favourite Onscreen Partners (variety) | Curious City | Nominated | |
| 2023 | Star Awards | Top 3 Most Popular Rising Stars | —N/a | Nominated | |
| 2023 | Star Awards | MYPICK! Favourite CP | Healing Heroes | Nominated | |
| 2023 | Star Awards | Chan Brothers My Star Guide Award | —N/a | Nominated | |
| 2024 | Star Awards | Top 3 Most Popular Rising Stars | —N/a | Nominated | |
| 2025 | Star Awards | Best Rising Star | House Everything (season 3) | Nominated | |
| 2025 | Star Awards | Top 3 Most Popular Rising Stars | —N/a | Nominated | |
