= Juin Teh =

Malaysian host and actress (born 1990)

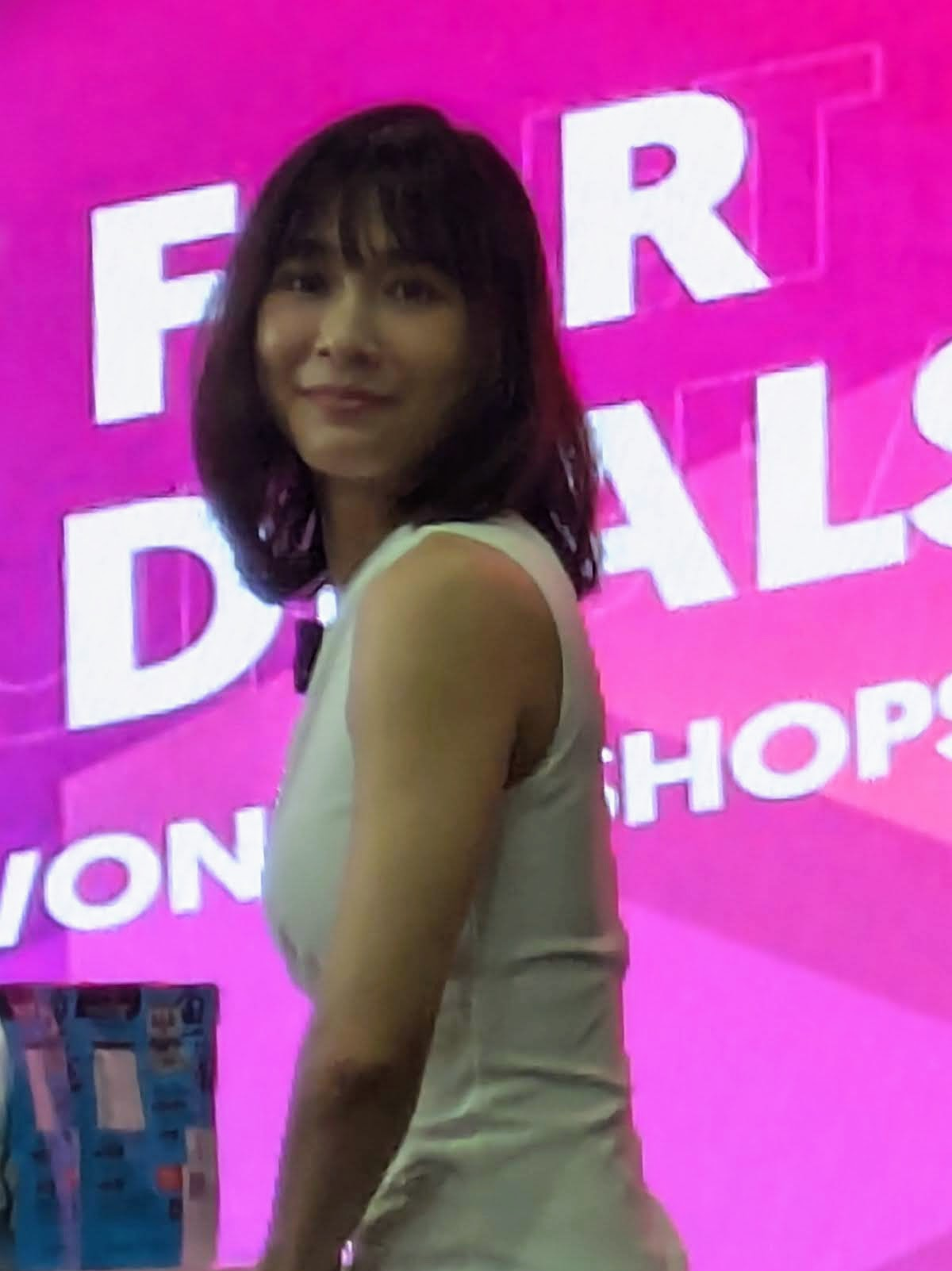
- Born: 6 June 1990 (age 36); Ipoh, Perak, Malaysia
- Other name: Zheng Liuyue
- Education: Chinese Culture University
- Occupations: Host; actress; radio DJ
- Years active: 2015–present
- Musical career
- Member of: 4567

Stage name
- Traditional Chinese: 鄭六月
- Simplified Chinese: 郑六月
- Hanyu Pinyin: Zhèng Liùyuè

Birth name
- Traditional Chinese: 鄭惠容
- Simplified Chinese: 郑惠容
- Hanyu Pinyin: Zhèng Huìróng

Juin Teh (born 6 June 1990) is a Malaysian host and actress. Teh began her career as an events host in Malaysia and took part in various television and radio stations' auditions before entering the 11th season of Mediacorp's Star Search competition in 2019, where she emerged as one of the top 12 finalists.

== Early life and career ==
Born in Ipoh, Malaysia, Teh adopted the stage name "Juin" (郑六月) when attending university as she wanted a name that is "easy and convenient to remember" and took inspiration from her birth date. Teh moved to Johor when she was between four and five years old where she completed her primary and secondary education. At the age of 17, she enrolled into the Chinese Culture University in Taipei, Taiwan where she majored in mass communications.

Teh auditioned for hosting roles at Kuala Lumpur Astro channel Evening Edition programme and Malaysia's radio station Ai FM, and participated in Singapore Mediacorp's So You Wanna Be A DJ competition, but did not make it through in either.

In 2012, veteran media personality Chang Mei-hsiang bought the Rediffusion brand and Teh was one of the top five contestants in a DJ competition organised by the station; Teh in turn was enlisted as Chang's personal assistant. She later worked as a DJ for Malaysia's ONFM for two and a half years, and shuttled between Kuala Lumpur and Johor, where she lives.

She is also part of the group "4567", which was formed by Mediacorp's artiste management arm The Celebrity Agency in 2021, along with Seow Sin Nee, Jernelle Oh and Gini Chang.

== Filmography ==
Teh has appeared in the following programmes and films:

=== Television series ===
Year	Title	Role	Notes	Ref.
2019	All Around You			
2020	The Right Time (2020; Fresh Takes! season 2)			
2020	Who Did It			
2020	Interns' Survivor Guide			
2020	The Peculiar Pawnbroker			
2021	Key Witness			
2021	CTRL			
2021	The Heartland Hero			
2021	Soul Old Yet So Young			
2022	Healing Heroes			
2022	Love At First Bite			
2022	Soul Doctor			
2022	In Safe Hands			
2022	Home Again			
2022	I'm Actor Ah De			
2023	The Sky is Still Blue			
2023	I Do, Do I?			
2024	Unforgivable			
2025	Emerald Hill - The Little Nyonya Story			

=== Film ===
- The Leakers (2018; cameo)

=== Variety show ===
- ONFM Travelling Programme (2015)
- Way Back To Beauty Season 1 (2016)
- ONFM Property Makeover Project (2016)
- Women Talk Show Season 1 (2017)
- Star Awards 2021 Backstage Live (2021)
- The Food Lab (2021)
- #JustSwipeLah (2021–present; web series)
- Star Awards 2022 Backstage Live (2022)
- Silver Carnival 2022 (2022)
- Lunar New Year Eve Specials (2022)
- The Star Athlete (2023)
- 4567 JB Makan Lobang (2023; web series)

== Discography ==
=== Singles ===
Year	Song title	Notes	Ref.
2020	"Xin Nian Dao"	MediaCorp Music Lunar New Year Album 21	

== Awards and nominations ==
Organisation	Year	Category	Nominated work	Result	Ref
Star Awards	2021	Best Newcomer	Interns' Survivor Guide	Nominated	
Star Awards	2022	My Pick! Most Attention Seeking New-Gen Host	Star Awards 2021 Backstage Live	Nominated	
Star Awards	2023	Top 3 Most Popular Rising Stars	—N/a	Nominated	
Star Awards	2024	Top 3 Most Popular Rising Stars	—N/a	Nominated	
Star Awards	2025	Best Rising Star	Unforgivable	Nominated	
Star Awards	2025	Top 3 Most Popular Rising Stars	—N/a	Nominated	
Star Awards	2026	Top 3 Most Popular Rising Stars	—N/a	Won	
