= Star Awards for Best Rising Star =

Singaporean media award

Star Awards for Best Rising Star 最佳潜力星
- Awarded for: Best Performance by a Newcomer for a Programme
- Country: Singapore
- Presented by: Mediacorp
- First award: 1994
- Most recent winner: Gladys Bay — Under The Net (2026)

The Star Awards for Best Rising Star is an award presented annually at the Star Awards, a ceremony that was established in 1994.

== History ==
The category was introduced in 1994, at the 1st Star Awards ceremony as two separate awards; Yao Wenlong received the award as the Most Popular Male Newcomer award while Ivy Lee received the Most Popular Female Newcomer award and both were given in honour of a Mediacorp male and female newcomer who were deemed the most popular among the television audience. The nominees are determined by a team of judges employed by MediaCorp; winners are selected by a majority vote from the public via telephone and SMS text voting. Between 1995 and 2006, the category eliminated the distinctions between male and female newcomers and was given as a single award under the name of Most Popular Newcomer.

From 2007, the award went through a major revamp and was renamed as Best Newcomer. It was changed from being a popularity award to a professional award, and is given in honour of a MediaCorp newcomer who has delivered an outstanding performance in their field of profession. Similar to the Most Popular Newcomer award, the nominees are determined by a team of judges employed by MediaCorp; but the winners are selected by a majority vote from the entire judging panel. Pornsak is the first winner of the newly revamped category.

The nominees for this award were selected without any reference to their respective work titles – with the exception of 1995, 1998, 1999, 2012, 2013, 2018, 2019 and 2021 when the newcomers were nominated together with the work titles which establish the public identity of the newcomers thereafter.

The award was not presented in 2003, 2010, 2011, 2014, 2016, 2017, and 2022 due to the lack of eligible nominees.

From 2023, the award went through another revamp and was renamed as Best Rising Star. This award is similar to the Best Newcomer award, with artistes being eligible as long as they have five years or less of professional screen acting and/or hosting experience the year before the awards. Artistes are also eligible if they have professional screen acting and/or hosting experience (excluding cameo appearances) and/or experiences before 18 years of age. Artistes that are nominated must have performed and/or presented in at least five episodes of eligible programmes, and similar to the Best Newcomer, nominees that have won any popularity and/or performance awards in previous awards ceremony are no longer eligible.

Since its inception, the award has been given to 24 newcomers or rising stars. Gladys Bay is the most recent winner in this category for his role in Under The Net.

== Recipients ==
Year	Newcomer	Work title (role)	Nominees	Ref
Most Popular Male Newcomer / Most Popular Female Newcomer
1994	Yao Wenlong	—N/a		
1994	Ivy Lee	—N/a		
Most Popular Newcomer
1995	Fann Wong	Chronicle of Life (Fang Ling 方玲)	Bernard Tan — Bond of Love (Song Wenhui 宋文辉); Michelle Chia — Strange Encounters 3 (Lin Fengjie 林凤姐); Thomas Ong — Love at Last (Huang Jiawei 黄家伟); Raymond Yong — Chronicle of Life (Zhou Zhiheng 周志衡)	
1996	Phyllis Quek	—N/a	Christopher Lee; Ziozio Lim; Ix Shen; Jacelyn Tay	
1997	James Lye	—N/a	Sharon Au; Irin Gan; Michelle Goh; Guo Liang; Hong Liqing; Wong Li-Lin; Li Yuling; Lynn Poh; Diana Ser; Deborah Sim; Constance Song; Xu Meiluan	
1998	Evelyn Tan	A Place to Call Home (He Yiwen 何依雯)	Jerry Chang — The New Adventures of Wisely (Qi Bai 齐白 / Da Wei 大卫); Henry Chong — Starting Point (Lin Tianhong 林天鸿); Amanda Ho — Starting Point (Li Zu'er 李祖儿); Huang Feixiang — The Test of Time (Fu Mingyi 傅明义); Huang Guoliang — Starting Point (Liu Jicheng 刘集成); Andi Lim — Starting Point (Chen Kunsheng 陈坤生); Yvonne Lim — Starting Point (He Xinjie 何芯婕); Michelle Liu — Starting Point (Zhong Yamin 钟雅敏); Vincent Ng — Sword and Honour (Tianci 天赐); Joey Swee — The Test of Time (Zhou Ailing 周爱菱); Florence Tan — Immortal Love (Fang Jiawen 方嘉文 / Lu Wenyan 卢文烟 / Qiu Wenfeng 邱文凤); Sean Tang — A Place to Call Home (Chen Haixing 陈海星); Tay Ping Hui — On the Edge: Mr Personality (Lin Chunming 林春明)	
1999	Nick Shen	My Grandpa (Fang Zhenhua 方振华)	Apple Hong — P.I. Blues (Chen Anqi 陈安琪); Carol Tham — My Grandpa (Xiaona 小娜); Samantha Toh — P.I. Blues (Deng Jiali 邓家丽)	
2000	Dasmond Koh	—N/a	Priscelia Chan; Raymond Chen; Vivian Lai; Robin Leong; Liao Yunyi; Oh Say Tuck; Qi Yuwu; Jeff Wang	
2001	Fiona Xie	—N/a	Bukoh Mary; Gan Woan Wen; Michelle Liow; Pierre Png; John Wong	
2002	Jeanette Aw	—N/a	Zully Le; Lim Leng Kee; Jaime Teo; Allan Wu	
2004	Joanne Peh	—N/a	Felicia Chin; Ng Hui; Qi Qi; Rui En	
2005	Jesseca Liu	—N/a	Julian Hee; Ezann Lee; Christina Lin; Serene Loo	
2006	Kelvin Tan	—N/a	Elvin Ng; Chew Sin Huey; Candyce Toh; Dawn Yeoh	
Best Newcomer 最佳新人
2007	Pornsak	—N/a	Nat Ho; Kang Cheng Xi; Jacqueline Sue; Tang Lingyi	
2009	Dai Xiangyu	—N/a	Andie Chen; Paige Chua; Ya Hui; Jerry Yeo; Zhang Zhenxuan	
2012	Kate Pang	A Tale of 2 Cities (Lin Le 林乐)	Adeline Lim — Devotion (Wufeng 五凤); Sora Ma — Love Thy Neighbour (Dai Peijun 戴佩君); Romeo Tan — C.L.I.F. (Xu Wenxiong 许文雄); Jeffrey Xu — Devotion (Zheng Yimin 郑逸民)	
2013	Ian Fang	Don't Stop Believin' (Bai Zhixiang 白志翔)	Edwin Goh — Don't Stop Believin' (Cai Wensheng 蔡文胜); Elizabeth Lee — Show Hand (Coco); Shane Pow — It Takes Two (B Niu B牛); Jayley Woo — Jump! (Liu Haiyan 刘海燕)	
2015	Aloysius Pang	—N/a	Hong Ling; Seraph Sun; Nick Teo; Carrie Wong	
2018	Chantalle Ng	While We Are Young (Huang Li Bai Yun 黄李白云)	He Ying Ying — 118 II (Xiao Dingdong 萧丁冬); Richie Koh — When Duty Calls (Loke Xian Feng 陆先锋); Hazelle Teo — Dear DJ (Joyce He 何九月); Zong Zijie — While We Are Young (Yang Xiaoshuai 杨小帅)	
2019	Jasmine Sim	Doppelganger (Li Jiawen 李嘉文)	Joel Choo — A Million Dollar Dream (Max); Angel Lim — Dream Walkers (Tang Ning 唐凝); Kayly Loh — Dream Walkers (Bimbo姐); Michelle Wong — Blessings II (Liu Saiwen 刘赛文)	
2021	Zhang Ze Tong	A Jungle Survivor (Zhong Jianting 钟建廷)	Sheryl Ang — All Around You (He Ruohua 何若华); Ke Le — Ah Gong Can Cook; Herman Keh — Interns' Survivor Guide (Focus); Seow Sin Nee — Hawker Academy; Benjamin Tan — My Guardian Angels (Tang Guiqiang 唐贵强); Juin Teh — Interns' Survivor Guide (Juliet)	
Best Rising Star 最佳潜力星
2023	Das DD	#JustSwipeLah	Jarrell Huang — In Safe Hands (Wu Guangming 吴光明); Joey Pink — Soul Detective (Hannah); Kiki Lim — When Duty Calls 2 (Goh Guan Lin 吴冠琳); Jernelle Oh — #JustSwipeLah	
2024	Yunis To	Stranger In The Dark (Cheryl Sun 孙雨泽)	Hank Wang — Stranger In The Dark (Yang Junzhe 杨俊哲); Isabelle Quek — Curious City S2; Karyn Wong — Battle of the Buskers; Yang Yan — Stranger In The Dark (Jin Xin 金鑫)	
2025	Tyler Ten	Unforgivable (Guo Wenhao 郭文皓)	Herman Keh — House Everything S3; Joey Tay — YES 933 TikTok Live; Juin Teh — Unforgivable (Wang Jinxiang 王金香); Ye Jia Yun — Uniquely Ours (Xia Yuling 夏语灵)	
2026	Gladys Bay	Under The Net (Bella 钟宝贝)	Cai Cheng Jun - Under The Net (Chen Jiaju 陈家驹); Gladys Ng - Under The Net (Chris 汪云林); Tan Ting Fong - YES 933 Comedy Series; Zhu Zeliang - Emerald Hill - The Little Nyonya Story (Zhang Yaoliang 张耀亮)	

== Award records ==
Won Best Newcomer or Best Rising Star and acting or hosting categories
Artiste	Won Best Newcomer or Best Rising Star	Won Best Actor / Actress	Won Best Supporting Actor / Actress	Won hosting award	Ref.
Ivy Lee	1994	2000, 2004, 2006	—N/a	—N/a	
Yao Wenlong	1994	—N/a	2001	—N/a	
Fann Wong	1995	1995	—N/a	—N/a	
Jeanette Aw	2002	2016	—N/a	—N/a	
Joanne Peh	2004	2009, 2012	2015	—N/a	
Jesseca Liu	2005	2026	—N/a	—N/a	
Pornsak	2007	—N/a	—N/a	2015 (Best Variety Show Host)	
Zhang Ze Tong	2021	—N/a	2024	—N/a	
Tyler Ten	2025	—N/a	2026	—N/a	
