= Star Awards for Best Info-Ed Programme =

Singaporean television award

Star Awards for Best Info-Ed Programme 最佳资讯节目
- Current: Star Awards 2025
- Awarded for: Best overall performance in a Mediacorp info-ed programme
- Country: Singapore
- Presented by: Mediacorp
- First award: 2006
- Currently held by: Legends of Singapore Comedy (2025)

The Star Awards for Best Info-Ed Programme is an award presented annually at the Star Awards, a ceremony that was established in 1994.

The category was introduced in 2006, at the 13th Star Awards ceremony; Y Do You Care received the award and it is given in honour of a Mediacorp info-ed programme which has delivered an outstanding overall performance. The nominees are determined by a team of judges employed by Mediacorp; winners are selected by a majority vote from the entire judging panel.

Since its inception, the award has been given to 14 info-ed programmes. Legends of Singapore Comedy is the most recent winner in this category. Since the ceremony held in 2017, Tuesday Report remains as the only info-ed programme to win in this category five times, surpassing Find Me A Singaporean which has two wins. In addition, Tuesday Report has been nominated on 19 occasions, more than any other info-ed programme. Behind Every Job, Food Hometown and Of Rites And Rituals hold the record for the most nominations without a win, with two.

== Recipients ==
Year	Title	Nominees	Ref
2006	Y Do You Care! 惊叹号！	Art Of War 孙子智慧; Of Rites And Rituals 我们的大日子; TR Report: Good Man Good Deed 2 特写：好人好事2; TR Report: Heirloom Recipe 5 特写：家传菜5 - 异国风味 ^{^{[II]}}	
2007	Find Me A Singaporean 稀游记	Design Asia 设计达人; History Teller 史迹密码; Simply Overseas 异乡人。新鲜事; Tuesday Report: Out of Bound 星期二特写：闲人免进	
2009	Tuesday Report: In The Face Of Death 星期二特写：生死一线	Come Dance with Me 与心共舞; Food Hometown 美食寻根; My World My Blog 青涩部落格; Of Rites And Rituals 2 我们的大日子2; Tuesday Report: 5 Years SARS-free 星期二特写:SARS后的天空	
2010	Stars for a Cause 明星志工队	Diminishing Horizons 消失地平线; Food Hometown 2 美食寻根2; Tuesday Report: Extraordinary People 星期二特写:不平凡的人; Tuesday Report: Life In A One-Room Flat 星期二特写:一房世界	
2011	Tuesday Report: 3 Days 2 Nights 星期二特写:三天两夜	Behind Every Job 美差事.苦差事; Food Notes 上食堂; Legendary Cuisine 传说中的料理; The Activist's Journey 仁心侠旅	
2012	Tuesday Report: Applaud to Life 星期二特写:谢幕人生	Behind Every Job 2 美差事.苦差事2; Culture In A Bowl 吃出一碗文化; Daddy 101 爸爸秘笈; Tuesday Report: A Taste of Life 星期二特写:人. 情. 味	
2013	Find Me A Singaporean 3 稀游记3	Stories 人间。事; The Banquet 大飨宴; The Era of Rising to Fame 快红时代; Tuesday Report: A Taste of Life II 星期二特写:人。情。味 II	
2014	Borders 边城故事	Tuesday Report: The Towkays 星期二特写:星洲头家; Big Factories 2: Made by Singapore! 巨工厂2 - 新加坡制造; Smart @ Work 上班不留白; Tuesday Report: Where We Connect 2 星期二特写:生活气场2	
2015	Tuesday Report: The Towkays 2 星期二特写：星洲头家2	A Taste of History 寻味地图; Hear Me Out 有话要说; Job X-Change 职业交换生; Where To Stay 到底住哪里？	
2016	Tuesday Report: Where The Home Is 星期二特写：广厦千万间	Face Off! 这样是怎样?; Homeward Bound 我家在这里; Life Extraordinaire 寻找毅中人; Tuesday Report: Lifeline 星期二特写：生命。线	
2017	Unique Towns 这个乡镇好独特	Innocence Lost 童工; Markets In Asia 游市集; Tuesday Report: All In The Family 星期二特写《家庭兵团》; Tuesday Report: The Nursing Story 星期二特写《一生。护事》	
2018	Little Masteros 小当家	Fixer 线人; Going Miles, Spreading Smiles 一人行，暖人心; National Flavours 民族味; Tuesday Report : #myconnectionsg 星期二特写:情牵新马	
2019	Business As Usual 买卖	Fixer 2 线人2; Forgotten Youths 边缘青年; Tuesday Report - #myconnectionsg 2 情牵新马2; Tuesday Report - When The Bell Rings 2 钟声响起2	
2021	Fixer S3 线人3	A Medical Journey 寻医; Be My Guest S2 我。董。你 2; Forbidding No More 极境之旅; Tuesday Report: A Hill and A River 星期二特写：一座山一条河; Tuesday Report: Home Away From Home 星期二特写：飘洋过海来这里; Tuesday Report: One Metre Apart 星期二特写：一米的距离	
2022	Cooking For A Cause 特别的食物给特别的你	Faces of Asia 印象亚洲; One In A Thousand 爱不罕见; Tuesday Report: The Towkays S3 星期二特写：星洲头家 S3; We Came This Far 我们是同乡	
2023	Forgotten Children 边缘儿童	As You Grow Old 当你老了; Being Together : A Family Portrait 当我们不在一起; Find Me A Singaporean : The Pandemic Special 稀游记之你还好吗？; Old Taste Detective S3 古早味侦探 3	
2024	Inside Crime Scene S2 狮城奇案之罪案现场	Forbidding No More S2 极境之旅; Old Taste Detective S4 古早味侦探 4; Two Worlds Apart 光照不到的角落; Wartime Food 战地食谱	
2025	Legends of Singapore Comedy 逗笑人间60年	Old Taste Detective S5 古早味侦探 5; Tuesday Report - Restart 星期二特写：重启; Women Behind Bars 女子监狱; World's Unique Neighbourhoods 世界独特社区	
2026	Pedal On For Love	Find Me A Singaporean : The World's My Stage; Forbidding No More S3; The Indigenous; Unusual Weddings	

^{^[I]} Each year is linked to the article about the Star Awards held that year.

^{^[II]} Prior to 2006, Tuesday Report was titled TR Report.

== Category facts ==
Most wins

Rank	1st	2nd	3rd
Info-ed Programme	Tuesday Report	Find Me A Singaporean	Borders; Stars for a Cause; Y Do You Care!
Total wins	5 wins	2 wins	1 win

Most nominations

Rank	1st	2nd
Info-ed Programme	Tuesday Report	Behind Every Job; Find Me A Singaporean; Food Hometown; Of Rites And Rituals
Total nominations	21 nominations	2 nominations

== See also ==
- Star Awards
- Star Awards for Best Info-Ed Programme Host
