= I Do, Do I? =

2023 Singaporean television series

- Traditional Chinese: 嫁給不同世界的你
- Simplified Chinese: 嫁给不同世界的你
- Hanyu Pinyin: Jià gěi bù tóng shì jiè de nǐ
- Genre: Romance; Drama
- Written by: Yan Peng Cheong
- Directed by: Doreen Yap
- Starring: Felicia Chin; Jason Godfrey; Tyler Ten; Zong Zijie; Cynthia Koh; Ferlyn Wong; Panitsara Yang
- Country of origin: Singapore
- Original languages: Mandarin; English; Italian; Thai; Korean; Bahasa Indonesia
- No. of seasons: 1
- No. of episodes: 20

Production
- Running time: 45 minutes
- Production company: Mediacorp

Original release
- Network: Channel 8; meWATCH
- Release: 21 December 2023 – 17 January 2024

I Do, Do I? (Chinese: 嫁给不同世界的你) was a Singaporean television series starring Felicia Chin, Jason Godfrey, Cynthia Koh, Ferlyn Wong, Tyler Ten, Zong Zijie and Thai actress Panitsara Yang. Revolving around three interracial couples, the series marks Chin's first leading role in a Channel 8 drama series since leaving Mediacorp in June 2022. The series debuted on meWATCH on 18 December 2023 and aired on Channel 8 every weekday at 9 pm local time.

== Cast ==
- Felicia Chin as Tu Youmi
- Jason Godfrey as Leonardo De Luca
- Cynthia Koh as Pan Anyu
- Ferlyn Wong as Jiang Yihua
- Tyler Ten as Ma Jiabao
- Zong Zijie as Johan
- Panitsara Yang as Fon
- Marcus Chin as Tu Jinsheng
- Aileen Tan as Hong Lixia
- Herman Keh as Kris
- Juin Teh as Zhong Meishi
- Kevin as Theo
- Kayly Loh as Lian Yurou
- Pierre Png as Hugo

== Production ==
In an interview, Chin revealed that she took no-pay leave for three months from her full-time content creator job to film the series.
