= Jump! (TV series) =

Singapore Chinese drama

- 跳浪
- Genre: Drama; Comedy; School; Romance; Jump Rope
- Directed by: Wang Guo Le 王国乐
- Starring: Jeanette Aw 欧宣; Zhang Zhenhuan 张振寰; Wong Jing Lun 黄靖伦
- Opening theme: 幸福号召 by 蔡艾珈
- Ending theme: 亚国转 by 蔡艾珈
- Country of origin: Singapore
- Original language: Chinese
- No. of episodes: 13

Production
- Producer: Han Guang Wei 韩光伟
- Running time: 45 minutes
- Production company: threesixzero production

Original release
- Network: MediaCorp Channel U
- Release: 16 May – 1 June 2012

Related
- Don't Stop Believin' (2012); While We Are Young (2017); My School Daze (2009)

Jump! (跳浪) is a Singaporean Chinese drama which aired on MediaCorp Channel U in May 2012. It was aired on weekdays in the 10pm time slot. The series features Jeanette Aw, Zhang Zhenhuan, and Taiwan-based Singaporean singer Wong Jing Lun in his acting debut.

== Plot ==
Xiao Chunli is a Chinese teacher at Blue Sky Secondary School, neighbourhood school notorious for its rock-bottom results and delinquency. Her efforts to help her students are hampered by Mr Yan, the school principal who cares more about KPIs than the students themselves. One of the teachers Xu Dele is a master with the skipping rope and he begins recruiting students to participate in a double Dutch competition. Much to Miss Xiao and Mr Xu's frustration, several of the more problematic students or those rejected by other CCAs are "dumped" into the team.

Mr Xu and his students embark on a quest to win a medal at the competition. The students learn some valuable lessons about life and teamwork along the way.

== Cast ==
Cast	Role	Description
Jeanette Aw	Xiao Chunli 萧春丽	Miss Xiao (萧老师); A Teacher in Blue Sky Secondary School; Form Teacher of 5D but later no longer a form teacher due to principals punishment Teacher in charge of Gymnastics Club; Xu Dele's Girlfriend; Xu Dele Stayed in her house with her mum but got chased out by her when she found out he was working for the principal but misunderstood him
Kiki Lim	Xiao Chunli 萧春丽	Young Xiao Chunli
Zhang Zhenhuan	Xu Dele 徐德乐	Mr Xu (徐老师); Judge Xu; Director Xu; Speed; Pose as a Mathematics & PE Teacher in Blue Sky Secondary School; Teacher in charge of Gymnastics Club; Form Teacher of 5D; Coulstant for Director Lin; Xiao Chunli's boyfriend Liu Haiyan, Chen Xi, Li Guohui, Guo Xingnan & Zhuang Meixin 's Form Teacher
Wong Jing Lun	Zhang Guolun 章国伦	Mr Zhang (章老师); A Chinese Teacher of 5D; A Teacher in Blue Sky Secondary School but resigned and went abroad to get a degree
Jayley Woo	Liu Haiyan 刘海燕	Yen; A student of Blue Sky Secondary School; A member of the Gymnastics Club and Jump Rope Team; Xiao Chunli & Xu Dele's Student
Edwin Goh	Chen Xi 陈熙	Rascal (臭小子); A student of Blue Sky Secondary School; A member of the Gymnastics Club and Jump Rope Team; Xiao Chunli & Xu Dele's Student
Tan Mei Kee 陈美琪	Fu Xiaomin 傅晓敏	A student of Blue Sky Secondary School; A member of the Gymnastics Club and Jump Rope Team; Became a leader of Wave Jumpers; Miss Deng's Student
Justin Peng 彭修轩	Li Guohui 李国辉	A student of Blue Sky Secondary School; A member of the Gymnastics Club and Jump Rope Team; He was once an express stream drop to normal stream Xiao Chunli & Xu Dele's Student
Phua Yida	Guo Xingnan 郭邢男	A student of Blue Sky Secondary School; A member of the Gymnastics Club and Jump Rope Team; Transferred Student and has music talent Xiao Chunli & Xu Dele's Student
Fang Rong	Zhuang Meixin 庄美心	A student of Blue Sky Secondary School; A member of the Volleyball team and Jump Rope Team; Scored one A1, two A2 & two B3 eligible to study in JC; Xiao Chunli & Xu Dele's Student
Cavin Soh	Yan Tianfa 颜天发	Mr Yan (校长); The new principal of Blue Sky Secondary School; His motive is to build the school reputation and KPI
Richard Low	Uncle Cai	Chen Xi's Grandfather
Lina Ng	Mrs Fu 傅太太	Fu Xiaomin's Mum
Chen Guohua	HOD	Tried to Expelled Chen Xi from School; Tried to disband Gymnastics Team and Jump Rope Group
Ng Hui	Miss Deng 登老师	Help a student to achieve a dream but cause him to walk with a limp Transferred to Blue Sky Secondary as a teacher and counselor Fu Xiaomin's Form Teacher

== Accolades ==
Year	Award	Category	Nominee	Result	Ref
2013	Star Awards	Young Talent Award	Tan Mei Kee 陈美琪	Nominated	
2013	Star Awards	Best Newcomer	Jayley Woo	Nominated	
