= Star Awards for Best Supporting Actor =

Singaporean television award

Star Awards for Best Supporting Actor 最佳男配角
- Awarded for: Best Performance by an Actor in a Supporting Role
- Country: Singapore
- Presented by: Mediacorp
- First award: 1995
- Most recent winner: Tyler Ten — Emerald Hill - The Little Nyonya Story (2026)

Highlights
- Most awards: Huang Yiliang (3)
- Most nominations: Chen Shucheng (12)

The Star Awards for Best Supporting Actor is an award presented annually at the Star Awards, a ceremony that was established in 1994.

The category was introduced in 1995, at the 2nd Star Awards ceremony; Xie Shaoguang received the award for his role in Larceny of Love and it is given in honour of a Mediacorp actor who has delivered an outstanding performance in a supporting role. The nominees are determined by a team of judges employed by Mediacorp; winners are selected by a majority vote from the entire judging panel.

Since its inception, the award has been given to 21 actors. Tyler Ten is the most recent winner in this category for his role in Emerald Hill - The Little Nyonya Story. Since the ceremony held in 2006, Huang Yiliang and Chen Hanwei are both the only actors to win in this category thrice, surpassing Chen Guohua, Chen Shucheng, Tay Ping Hui, and Xie who have two wins each. Chen Shucheng has also been nominated on 12 occasions, more than any other actor. Andie Chen holds the record for the most nominations without a win, with seven.

== Recipients ==
Year	Actor	Work title (role)	Nominees	Ref.
1995	Xie Shaoguang	Larceny of Love (Jiang Zefu 江泽夫)	Chen Shucheng — Strange Encounters (Cai Hong 蔡弘); Richard Low — Coffee or Tea (Gu Qi 顾七); Zhang Xinxiang — Young Justice Bao (Zhan Zhao 展昭); Zhu Houren — Thunder Plot (Ren Yonggang 任永刚)	
1996	Xie Shaoguang	The Golden Pillow (Sai Wei 賽威)	Ang Puay Heng — Dr Justice 2 (He Yongli 何勇立); Zhang Xinxiang — The Golden Pillow (Zhou Hongsheng 周洪生); Zheng Geping — Tofu Street (Wang A'xiong 王阿雄); Zhu Houren — The Teochew Family (Fu Guobing 符国炳)	
1997	Richard Low	The Silver Lining (Huang Qinghe 黄庆和)	Chen Guohua — The Price of Peace (Zhang A'da 张阿大); Chen Shucheng — The Price of Peace (Tan Kah Kee 陈嘉庚); Chen Tianwen — The Royal Monk (Tie Tong 铁桶); Huang Yiliang — Brave New World (Gao Hongfei 高鸿飞)	
1998	Chen Guohua	Around People's Park (Qing 阿青)	Chunyu Shanshan — Rising Expectations (Zheng Zhijie Jack 郑志杰); Lin Yisheng — The New Adventures of Wisely (Chen Changqing 陈长青); Richard Low — Living in Geylang (Wang A'pao 王阿炮); Zheng Geping — The Return of the Condor Heroes (Gold Wheel Imperial Advisor 金轮法王)	
1999	Tay Ping Hui	Stepping Out (Liu Mei 刘妹)	Chunyu Shanshan — Stepping Out (Lin Baotian 林保田); Brandon Wong — Wok of Life (Wang Xia 汪虾); Zheng Geping — Wok of Life (Huang Xiaodong 黄小东); Zhu Houren — Wok of Life (Zeng Nanhua 曾南华)	
2000	Chen Guohua	My Home Affairs (Zheng Dayong 郑大勇)	Vincent Ng — Hainan Kopi Tales (Long Yonglin 龙永霖); Ix Shen — Hero of the Times (Nalan Degang 纳兰德刚); Yao Wenlong — Hainan Kopi Tales (Long Yong'an 龙永安); Zheng Geping — The Legendary Swordsman (Yue Buqun 岳不群)	
2001	Yao Wenlong	Looking for Stars (Tequila)	Chen Shucheng — Beyond the Axis of Truth (Wu Mingwei 伍名卫); Vincent Ng — Heroes in Black (Fan Yuan 范元); Nick Shen — Three Women and A Half (Jeffery); Rayson Tan — Three Women and A Half (Ken)	
2002	Huang Yiliang	The Vagrant (Huang Jinlang 黄金浪)	Chen Shucheng — The Wing of Desire (Hu Tie 胡铁); Huang Bingjie — The Wing of Desire (Lin Jiahao 林家豪); Nick Shen — The Reunion (San Wan 三万); Yao Wenlong — Viva Le Famille (Sun Yutai 孙裕泰)	
2003	Huang Yiliang	Holland V (Tian Dahua 田大华)	Huang Wenyong — Holland V (Lin Jingcai 林精彩); Andrew Seow — Love Is Beautiful (Huang Leshan 黄乐善); Jeff Wang — Holland V (Ying Tiancheng Edison 应天承); Yao Wenlong — Holland V (Li A'ming 李阿明)	
2004	Andrew Seow	Man at Forty (Tang Tang 糖糖)	Chen Shucheng — Room in My Heart (Li Ashun 李阿顺); Nick Shen — Always on My Mind (Tang Xinhai 汤心海); Jeff Wang — Double Happiness I (Luo Jiafu 罗家福); Zhang Xinxiang — Timeless Gift (Wang Xi 王喜)	
2005	Cavin Soh	Portrait of Home (Zhou Daqiu 周大丘)	Darren Lim — A New Life (Lin Laifa 林来发); Andrew Seow — A New Life (Zhang Hongyun 张鸿运); Alan Tern — Double Happiness II (Lin Wenjie 林文杰 / Lin Wenxiong 林文雄); Yao Wenlong — My Mighty-in-Laws	
2006	Huang Yiliang	Women of Times (Kuang Qicai 邝奇才)	Adam Chen — The Shining Star (Ah B 阿B); Shaun Chen — C.I.D. (Lin Chenghui 林成辉); Rayson Tan — The Undisclosed (Chong); Zheng Geping — The Shining Star (Huang Feilong 黄飞龙)	
2007	Darren Lim	Kinship (Xu Naifa 徐乃发)	Nick Shen — Like Father, Like Daughter (Gui 阿贵); Cavin Soh — Mars vs Venus (Wu Guohan Hanns 吴国汉); Brandon Wong — The Homecoming (Lai Guoqiang 赖国强); Yao Wenlong — Happily Ever After (Yang Jian 杨戬)	
2009	Chew Chor Meng	The Golden Path (Huang Kaida 黄凯达)	Zen Chong — The Little Nyonya (Robert Zhang 罗伯张); Dai Xiangyu — The Little Nyonya (Yamamoto Yousuke 山本洋介); Darren Lim — The Little Nyonya (Huang Jincheng 黄金成); Yao Wenlong — The Little Nyonya (Liu Yidao 刘一刀); Zhu Houren — The Defining Moment (Tang Weiye 唐伟业)	
2010	Zhu Houren	Reunion Dinner (Liang Zhigao 梁志高)	Darren Lim — My School Daze (Tang Andi 唐安迪); Jerry Yeo — The Ultimatum (Ye Rende 叶仁德); Zhang Zhenxuan — Together (Yao Wuji 姚无忌); Zheng Geping — Together (Qin Xianglin 秦相林)	
2011	Terence Cao	The Best Things In Life (Song Daming 宋达明)	Andie Chen — Precious Babes (Fu Weide 傅炜德); Zen Chong — Unriddle (Yu Zhenbang 余振邦); Darren Lim — Breakout (Wang Lianzhou 汪连州); Yao Wenlong — The Family Court (Huang Guanying 黄冠英)	
2012	Chen Shucheng	The Oath (Wu Zhixiong 吴志雄)	Chen Hanwei — A Song to Remember (Xu Kun 许昆); Cavin Soh — Love Thy Neighbour (Dai Deliang 戴德良); Rayson Tan — A Song to Remember (Black Snake 黑蛇); Brandon Wong — Love Thy Neighbour (Shen Jindao 沈金道)	
2013	Tay Ping Hui	Unriddle 2 (Zhang Yuze 张雨泽)	Huang Wenyong — Joys of Life (Han Jianren 韩健仁); Rayson Tan — It Takes Two (Zhang Yang 张扬); Romeo Tan — Joys of Life (Qian Erduo 钱二多); Zhu Houren — Pillow Talk (Zhang Qian 张谦)	
2014	Guo Liang	The Dream Makers (Yao Jianguo 姚建国)	Shaun Chen — The Dream Makers (Du Zhanpeng 杜展鹏); Dennis Chew — The Dream Makers (Fang Yuanren 方元仁); Jeffrey Xu — Marry Me (Xu Xiaodong Dave 徐小东); Zhang Zhenxuan — Break Free (Ye Zhibin 叶志斌)	
2015	Chen Hanwei	The Journey: Tumultuous Times (Hu Weiren 胡为人)	Chen Shucheng — Blessings (Lian Mengyong 连梦勇); Aloysius Pang — Against the Tide (Zhao Keji 赵克己); Zhang Zhenxuan — Against the Tide (Zhuo Dingkang 卓定康); Zhu Houren — In The Name Of Love (Wang Weiguo 王伟国)	
2016	Zhang Zhenxuan	The Dream Makers II (Chen Guang 陈光)	Andie Chen — The Journey: Our Homeland (Hong Dangyong 洪当勇); Chen Tianwen — 118 (Zhang Tiancheng 张天成); Ian Fang — Tiger Mum (Chen Haowei 陈浩威); Edwin Goh — The Dream Makers II (Eddy)	
2017	Romeo Tan	The Dream Job (Tim Goh 吴康顺)	Andie Chen — Hero (Ou Jinguang 区金光); Chen Shucheng — Fire Up (Zhuang Dexian 庄德贤); Ian Fang — The Dream Job (Lin Zijie 林梓杰); Jeffrey Xu — Peace & Prosperity (Lu Xiaoqiang 鹿小强)	
2018	Chen Hanwei	The Lead (Lin Xiaohu 林小虎)	Chen Shucheng — Home Truly (Hong Shan 洪山); Marcus Chin — Have a Little Faith 相信我 (Qian Zaide 钱载德); Shane Pow — When Duty Calls (Yao Weiguo Gordon 姚卫国); Brandon Wong — My Friends from Afar (Chen Xiaolong 陈小龙)	
2019	Chen Shucheng	A Million Dollar Dream (Hu Tianhao 胡添豪)	Andie Chen — My Agent Is a Hero (Max); Ian Fang — Till We Meet Again (Shuai Ge 帅戈); Shane Pow — Mind Matters (Hu Ruiming 胡锐铭); Xu Bin — Doppelganger (Li Zijian 李子健)	
2021	Bryan Wong	A Quest to Heal (Sun Xi 孙喜)	Chen Shucheng — Old Is Gold (Zhou Renfa 周仁发); Ian Fang — All Is Well – Singapore (Li Hao 李昊); Guo Liang — A Jungle Survivor (Titan); Darren Lim — While You Were Away (Yu Guanming 余冠铭); James Seah — C.L.I.F. 5 (Lu Jiahao 陆家豪); Brandon Wong — Hello From the Other Side (Lao-ma 老马)	
2022	Jeffrey Xu	The Takedown (Lin Jinxiong 林金雄)	Chew Chor Meng — The Heartland Hero (Zhong Buzhang 钟布长); James Seah — Key Witness (Dex Ang); Zhang Ze Tong — Key Witness (Nick Zhu 朱靖翔); Zhu Houren — My Star Bride (Chung Yongnian 钟永年)	
2023	Brandon Wong	Dark Angel (Ke Zhixiong 柯志雄)	Andie Chen — Sisters Stand Tall (Yang Liwen 杨立文); Chew Chor Meng — Dark Angel (Yang Tao 杨涛); Darren Lim — Genie in a Cup (Ma Xiaobao 马小宝); Zhu Houren — Your World in Mine (Hong Xingwang 洪兴旺)	
2024	Zhang Ze Tong	All That Glitters (Richard Mo)	Andie Chen — Whatever Will Be, Will Be (Lin Guangjian 林光建); Darren Lim — SHERO (Dai Guowei 戴国威); Peter Yu — Cash on Delivery (Qiu Tian 邱天); Zhu Houren — Till the End (Li Zhiyin 李智音)	
2025	Chen Hanwei	Unforgivable (Chen Yongren 陈勇仁)	Chen Shu Cheng — Unforgivable (Gao Guangsheng 高广生); Guo Liang — To Be Loved (Zhuo Youhai 卓有海); Pierre Png — Moments (Hanzo 云翰佐); Xu Bin — Kill Sera Sera (Lin Guoguang 林国光)	
2026	Tyler Ten	Emerald Hill - The Little Nyonya Story (Bai Ah Li 白阿力)	Andie Chen - Fixing Fate (Inspector Hong / Hong Dashi 洪警长 / 洪达实); James Seah - Another Wok of Life (Ye Tian Yong 叶天勇); Jeremy Chan - Another Wok of Life (Guan Daji 关大吉); Zhang Ze Tong - Emerald Hill - The Little Nyonya Story (Huang Zu Ye 黄祖业)	

== Nominees distribution chart ==
Colour key
Actor won the award
Actor was nominated for the award
Actor was not nominated for the award
Actor is currently nominated for the award

Actor	Year																														Wins	Noms
Actor	1995	1996	1997	1998	1999	2000	2001	2002	2003	2004	2005	2006	2007	2009	2010	2011	2012	2013	2014	2015	2016	2017	2018	2019	2021	2022	2023	2024	2025	2026	Wins	Noms
Huang Yiliang			N					1	2			3																			3	4
Chen Hanwei																	N			1			2						3		3	4
Xie Shaoguang	1	2																													2	2
Chen Guohua			N	1		2																									2	3
Tay Ping Hui					1													2													2	2
Chen Shucheng	N		N				N	N		N							1			N		N	N	2	N				N		2	12
Richard Low	N		1	N																											1	3
Yao Wenlong						N	1	N	N		N		N	N		N															1	8
Andrew Seow									N	1	N																				1	3
Cavin Soh											1		N				N														1	3
Darren Lim											N		1	N	N	N									N		N	N			1	8
Chew Chor Meng														1												N	N				1	3
Zhu Houren	N	N			N									N	1			N		N						N	N	N			1	10
Terence Cao																1															1	1
Guo Liang																			1						N				N		1	3
Zhang Zhenxuan															N				N	N	1										1	4
Romeo Tan																		N				1									1	2
Bryan Wong																									1						1	1
Jeffrey Xu																			N			N				1					1	3
Brandon Wong					N								N				N						N		N		1				1	6
Zhang Zetong																										N		1		N	1	3
Tyler Ten																														1	1	1
Andie Chen																N					N	N		N			N	N		N	0	7
Zheng Geping		N		N	N	N						N			N																0	6
Nick Shen							N	N		N			N																		0	4
Rayson Tan							N					N					N	N													0	4
Ian Fang																					N	N		N	N						0	4
Zhang Xinxiang	N	N								N																					0	3
James Seah																									N	N				N	0	3
Chen Tianwen			N																		N										0	2
Chunyu Shanshan				N	N																										0	2
Vincent Ng						N	N																								0	2
Jeff Wang									N	N																					0	2
Huang Wenyong									N									N													0	2
Shaun Chen												N							N												0	2
Zen Chong														N		N															0	2
Shane Pow																							N	N							0	2
Xu Bin																								N					N		0	2
Ang Puay Heng		N																													0	1
Lin Yisheng				N																											0	1
Ix Shen						N																									0	1
Huang Bingjie								N																							0	1
Alan Tern											N																				0	1
Adam Chen												N																			0	1
Dai Xiangyu														N																	0	1
Jerry Yeo															N																0	1
Dennis Chew																			N												0	1
Aloysius Pang																				N											0	1
Edwin Goh																					N										0	1
Marcus Chin																							N								0	1
Peter Yu																												N			0	1
Pierre Png																													N		0	1
Jeremy Chan																														N	0	1

== Award records ==
Record	Actor	Count	Remarks
Most wins	Huang Yiliang	3	2002, 2003, 2006
Most wins	Chen Hanwei	3	2015, 2018, 2025
Most nominations	Chen Shucheng	12	1995, 1997, 2001, 2002, 2004, 2012, 2015, 2017, 2018, 2019, 2021, 2025
Longest gap between wins	Tay Ping Hui	14 years	1999—2013
Shortest gap between wins (consecutive wins)	Xie Shaoguang	1 year	1995—1996
Shortest gap between wins (consecutive wins)	Huang Yiliang	1 year	2002—2003
Most nominations before first award	Chen Shucheng	5	Won first award (6th nomination) in 2012
Most nominations before first award	Brandon Wong	5	Won first award (6th nomination) in 2023
Most nominations without a win	Andie Chen	7	2011, 2016, 2017, 2019, 2023, 2024, 2026
Longest gap between nominations	Chen Tianwen	19 years	1997—2016
Most consecutive nominations	Yao Wenlong	4	2000, 2001, 2002, 2003
Most consecutive nominations	Darren Lim	4	2007, 2009, 2010, 2011
Most consecutive nominations	Chen Shucheng	4	2017, 2018, 2019, 2021
Won at first nomination	Xie Shaoguang	8	1995
Won at first nomination	Tay Ping Hui	8	1999
Won at first nomination	Cavin Soh	8	2005
Won at first nomination	Chew Chor Meng	8	2009
Won at first nomination	Terence Cao	8	2011
Won at first nomination	Guo Liang	8	2014
Won at first nomination	Bryan Wong	8	2021
Won at first nomination	Tyler Ten	8	2026
Nominated for Best Actor and Best Supporting Actor in the same year	Xie Shaoguang	5	1996
Nominated for Best Actor and Best Supporting Actor in the same year	Chen Shucheng	5	2002
Nominated for Best Actor and Best Supporting Actor in the same year	Chen Hanwei	5	2015
Nominated for Best Actor and Best Supporting Actor in the same year	Andie Chen	5	2017, 2024
Nominated for Best Actor and Best Supporting Actor in the same year	Brandon Wong	5	2023
Won Best Actor and Best Supporting Actor	Xie Shaoguang	1	1996

== Multiple awards and nominations ==
The following individuals received two or more Best Supporting Actor awards:

Wins	Actor	Nominations
3	Huang Yiliang 黄奕良	4
3	Chen Hanwei 陈汉玮	4
2	Chen Shucheng 陈澍城	12
2	Chen Guohua 陈国华	3
2	Tay Ping Hui 郑斌辉	2
2	Xie Shaoguang 谢韶光	2

The following individuals received two or more Best Supporting Actor nominations:

Nominations	Actor
12	Chen Shucheng 陈澍城
10	Zhu Houren 朱厚任
8	Darren Lim 林明伦
8	Yao Wenlong 姚彣隆
7	Andie Chen 陈邦鋆
6	Brandon Wong 黄炯耀
6	Zheng Geping 郑各评
4	Ian Fang 方威捷
4	Huang Yiliang 黄奕良
4	Nick Shen 沈炜竣
4	Rayson Tan 陈泰铭
4	Zhang Zhenxuan 张振煊
4	Chen Hanwei 陈汉玮
3	Chen Guohua 陈国华
3	Chew Chor Meng 周初明
3	Richard Low 刘谦益
3	Andrew Seow 萧乙铭
3	Cavin Soh 苏梽诚
3	Jeffrey Xu 徐鸣杰
3	Zhang Xinxiang 张信祥
3	Guo Liang 郭亮
3	James Seah 谢俊峰
3	Zhang Ze Tong 张哲通
2	Shaun Chen 陈泓宇
2	Chen Tianwen 陈天文
2	Zen Chong 章证翔
2	Chunyu Shanshan 淳于珊珊
2	Huang Wenyong 黄文永
2	Vincent Ng 翁清海
2	Shane Pow 包勋评
2	Romeo Tan 陈罗密欧
2	Tay Ping Hui 郑斌辉
2	Jeff Wang 王振復
2	Xie Shaoguang 谢韶光
2	Xu Bin 徐彬
