= Emerald Hill - The Little Nyonya Story =

- Theatrical Poster
- 小娘惹之翡翠山
- Genre: Period drama
- Written by: Ang Eng Tee
- Directed by: Loo Yin Kam
- Starring: Tasha Low; Chantalle Ng; Ferlyn Wong; Zhang Zetong; Tyler Ten; Jesseca Liu; Kai Hsiu; Romeo Tan; Dawn Yeoh; Shaun Chen; Jojo Goh; Zoe Tay
- Opening theme: 落花如雨 by Kit Chan
- Ending theme: 南风吹 by Olivia Ong
- Country of origin: Singapore
- Original languages: Mandarin (with partial English, Malay and Hokkien)
- No. of episodes: 30

Production
- Producer: Loh Woon Woon
- Running time: 45 minutes

Original release
- Network: Netflix mewatch Channel 8
- Release: 19 March – 30 April 2025

Related
- The Little Nyonya (2008); The Little Nyonya (2020 Chinese remake)

Emerald Hill - The Little Nyonya Story (Chinese: 小娘惹之翡翠山) is a 2025 Singaporean drama serial on Mediacorp's Channel 8. It stars Tasha Low, Chantalle Ng, Ferlyn Wong, Zhang Zetong, Tyler Ten, Jesseca Liu, Kai Hsiu, Romeo Tan, Dawn Yeoh, Shaun Chen, Jojo Goh and Zoe Tay as the main cast. This series serves as a standalone sequel to Channel 8's 2008 series, The Little Nyonya, with Jeanette Aw reprising her role as Yamamoto Yueniang. It is set in the 1950s to 1970s and centres around an extended Peranakan Chinese family in Emerald Hill, Singapore.

The series first aired on Netflix and mewatch Prime on 10 March 2025, and every weekday on Channel 8 from 19 March 2025, at 21:00 (SGT). The drama became the first Channel 8 series to top Netflix Singapore's most-watched list after its streaming debut on 10 March 2025. The season finale was broadcast on 21 April 2025 for Netflix and meWatch Prime, and 30 April 2025 for Channel 8.

During the 2026 Star Awards, the series had 17 nominations and won six awards.

== Plot ==
The series follows the lives of three Nyonyas from the Zhang family, a Baba Nyonya household in Emerald Hill, Singapore. The story follows Zhang Xinniang, Zhang Anna, and Zhang Anya.

Anya, born into a wealthy family, is abducted at a young age and forced into a brothel, facing a turbulent life. Xinniang, once a street beggar, is adopted by a wealthy family and grows into a striking and accomplished young woman. Anna, regarded as a bringer of misfortune by her birth family, is raised away from home, only to return with a changed temperament that unsettles her household.

As their destinies become intertwined, the three women navigate the complexities of family ties and love. Their journey explores themes of resilience and self-determination as they strive to overcome adversity and reshape their futures.

== Cast ==
=== Zhang family ===
- Tasha Low as Zhang Xinniang Emily/Zhenen, Zhang Jin He and Li Shu Qin's daughter
- Chantalle Ng as Zhang Anna, Zhang Jin Quan and Kang Si Li's youngest daughter
- Ferlyn Wong as Zhang Anya/Zhou Hongyu (Chew Hong Ee), Zhang Jin He and Li Shu Qin's daughter
- Herman Keh as Zhang Yaoguang, Zhang Jin Quan and Kang Si Li's eldest son
- Zhu Zeliang as Zhang Yaoliang, Zhang Jin Quan and Kang Si Li's second son
- Zoe Tay as Liu Xiu Niang, Zhang Jin Hai/Jin He/Jin Quan/Yin Niang's mother
- Nick Teo as Zhang Yaozu, Zhang Jin Hai and Li Shu Yu's son
- Shaun Chen as Zhang Jinhai, Liu Xiu Niang's eldest son
- Jojo Goh as Li Shuyu, Zhang Jin Hai's wife
- Kai Hsiu as Zhang Jinhe, Liu Xiu Niang's second son
- Jesseca Liu as Li Shuqin, Zhang Jin He's wife
- Romeo Tan as Zhang Jinquan, Liu Xiu Niang's third son
- Dawn Yeoh as Kang Sili, Zhang Jin Quan's wife
- Sheila Sim as Zhang Yinniang, Liu Xiu Niang's youngest daughter
- Rayson Tan as Zhang Qiye (Cameo appearance), Liu Xiu Niang's husband
- Priscelia Chan as Ping Jie, Zhang family's maid, serve Liu Xiu Niang
- Jolynn Min as Ah Fang, Zhang's family's maid, Serve Li Shuyu
- Juin Teh as Yan Jie, Zhang family's maid, serve Li Shuqin
- Gini Chang as Ah Zhen, Zhang family's maid, serve Kang Sili
- Jernelle Oh as Ah Hua, Zhang family's maid, serve Zhang Xinniang
- Kiki Lim as Ah Ju, Zhang family's maid
- Seow Sin Nee as Ah Hao, Zhang family's maid

=== Huang family ===
- Zhang Zetong as Huang Zuye (Ng Chor Yap), Yueniang's adopted son, Zhang Xinniang's love interest
- Jeanette Aw as Yamamoto Yueniang, Zhang family's friend, Huang Zuye‘s adopted mother
- Huang Yuzhu, Yueniang’s stepsister, Zu Ye’s biological mother (Mentioned only)
- Huang Ju Xiang, Yueniang’s mother (Mentioned only)
- Tian Lan, Yueniang’s grandmother (Mentioned only)
- An Qi, Yueniang’s granddaughter, Zu Ye’s daughter (Archival footage)

=== Other characters ===
- Tyler Ten as Bai Ah Li, gangster and childhood friend of Zhang Xinniang, likes Zhang Xinniang
- Chen Liping as Cai Zhuniang/Ah Zhu, Zhang Xinniang's foster mother
- Elvin Ng as Simon Chen Donghao, Zhang Yin Niang's boyfriend
- Desmond Ng as Kang Zhijie, Kang Si Li's younger brother
- Aileen Tan as Su Guifeng, brothel owner
- Chen Tianwen as Wu De, brothel customer
- Chen Huihui as Ying Jie, Gui Feng's maid
- Zhai Siming as Xiao Laoshu, gangster, Bai Ah Li’s fellow, Xiao Hui’s boyfriend
- Yunis To as Xiao Hui, student, Xiao Lao Shu’s girlfriend
- Guo Liang as Gao Si, police inspector
- Dennis Chew as Ni Lao Zi, storyteller
- Cavin Soh as Qian Duoduo, a supervisor working for Yamamoto Yueniang
- Chen Shucheng as Uncle Qing, Li Shu Qin's family's old worker
- Eric Lay as Guo Zhi Bang, Zhang Anna’s fiancee, but like Zhang Anya
- Ah Tao, Yueniang’s maid (mentioned only)
- Chen Xi, Yueniang’s love interest (Archival footage)

== Production ==
Mediacorp first announced the development of the series in October 2023 as a sequel to The Little Nyonya. Production officially began on 30 January 2024, with a main cast that includes Tasha Low, Chen Liping, Jesseca Liu, Chantalle Ng, Ferlyn Wong, Kiki Lim, Sheila Sim, Elvin Ng, Zoe Tay, Shaun Chen, Romeo Tan, Tyler Ten, Zhang Zetong, Dawn Yeoh, Desmond Ng, Herman Keh, Zhai Siming and Zhu Zeliang. Zhang Zetong took over the role of middle-aged Zhang Zuye originally portrayed by Edsel Lim and Zen Chong.

Actress Jeanette Aw reprised her role as Yamamoto Yueniang, the protagonist in The Little Nyonya (2008 tv series).

Filming for the series took place primarily in Singapore, with select outdoor scenes shot in Malacca and Johor, Malaysia. Mediacorp leased a two-storey conserved bungalow known as the Keppel House located in Mount Faber that is managed by the Singapore Land Authority to serve as the Zhang family's residence. Built in 1899, the property underwent a S$1 million refurbishment for the production. The set included a specially constructed outdoor kitchen, along with the acquisition and rental of various Peranakan furniture pieces, including a round wooden table valued at S$50,000.

The series showcases traditional Peranakan attire, primarily the sarong kebaya, along with traditional beaded shoes. Designed by Raymond Wong and Tee Yu Yan, the outfits feature intricate motifs embellishing each kebaya. After filming concluded, the costumes and accessories were donated to the Peranakan Museum, where they are now exhibited in a section highlighting the significance of costume in Peranakan theatre and television.

On 2 December 2024, Mediacorp released the music video for the opening theme song, "落花如雨", sung by Kit Chan, on YouTube.

== Release ==
Mediacorp secured its first pre-sale distribution agreement with Netflix for Emerald Hill – The Little Nyonya Story in Southeast Asia. This milestone marks the first time a Mediacorp Chinese drama has been acquired through a pre-sale deal and premiered simultaneously on both Netflix and mewatch Prime on 10 March 2025. The series also debuted on 19 March 2025, on Channel 8 at 21:00 (SGT) in Singapore and on Astro AEC at 20:30 (MST) in Malaysia. It would be also debuted on sometime in 2026, simultaneously on TV5, ALLTV2 (through its ABS-CBN licensing), Kapamilya Channel and A2Z in the Philippines.

The final episode for the series was released on 21 April, and 30 April for Channel 8; it was originally scheduled for 29 April, but was pre-empted due to the coverage for the Chinese Roundtable Forums for the 2025 Singaporean general election.

== Controversy ==
=== Unauthorised redecoration ===
In July 2024, The Straits Times revealed that the redecoration works done at the bungalow which served as the Zhang family residence in the series were done without first getting the necessary permissions from government authorities.

The changes made to the bungalow were revealed during a media tour in June 2024, and officials with the Urban Redevelopment Authority inspected the site days later, amid feedback from an unidentified member of the heritage conservation community. The URA later allowed the changes on the basis of them being "superficial in nature." Mediacorp was not penalised, but was reminded that such works require permission.

=== Discriminatory portrayal of people with mental illness ===
On May 8, 2025, Dr. Charmaine Tang, a psychiatrist from Singapore’s Institute of Mental Health, wrote in her column for Lianhe Zaobao that the final episode of the drama portrayed schizophrenia inaccurately and in a stigmatizing way. In the drama, the character Zhang An Na is depicted from start to end as a cunning and manipulative villain. Yet in the final episode, she is suddenly diagnosed with schizophrenia, despite never exhibiting any symptoms consistent with the condition.

Dr. Tang emphasized that schizophrenia is a complex and serious mental disorder. Its symptoms include hallucinations, delusions, disorganized thinking, social withdrawal, and cognitive difficulties—none of which are reflected in Zhang An Na’s scheming and calculating behavior. She argued that using schizophrenia to explain moral failings or harmful actions conflates a severe medical condition with personality issues. The drama also wrongly portrays individuals with schizophrenia as dangerous, which may discourage them from seeking help and further isolate them socially, making recovery more difficult. She urged content creators to consult mental health professionals when depicting mental illness, and to portray individuals with such conditions seriously and realistically.

Executive producer Loh Woon Woon apologized for unintentionally reinforcing negative stereotypes about schizophrenia in the drama and stated that there was no intention to equate mental illness with moral deficiency.

== Accolades ==
Organisation	Year	Category	Nominee(s)	Result	Ref.
Star Awards	2026	Best Actor	Romeo Tan	Nominated	
Star Awards	2026	Best Actress	Jesseca Liu	Won	
Star Awards	2026	Best Actress	Chantalle Ng	Nominated	
Star Awards	2026	Best Actress	Tasha Low	Nominated	
Star Awards	2026	Best Supporting Actor	Tyler Ten	Won	
Star Awards	2026	Best Supporting Actor	Zhang Zetong	Nominated	
Star Awards	2026	Best Supporting Actress	Chen Liping	Won	
Star Awards	2026	Best Supporting Actress	Dawn Yeoh	Nominated	
Star Awards	2026	Best Supporting Actress	Jojo Goh	Nominated	
Star Awards	2026	Young Talent Award	Ivory Chia	Won	
Star Awards	2026	Young Talent Award	Asher Tay	Nominated	
Star Awards	2026	Young Talent Award	Ayden Chew	Nominated	
Star Awards	2026	Young Talent Award	Charlotte Yue	Nominated	
Star Awards	2026	Best Rising Star	Zhu Zeliang	Nominated	
Star Awards	2026	Best Theme Song	"落花如雨" by Kit Chan	Won	
Star Awards	2026	Best Drama Serial	—N/a	Won	
Star Awards	2026	The Show Stealer	Ivory Chua	Won	
Star Awards	2026	The Show Stealer	Chen Liping	Nominated	
Star Awards	2026	The Show Stealer	Chantalle Ng	Nominated	
Star Awards	2026	The Show Stealer	Jesseca Liu	Nominated	
Star Awards	2026	The Show Stealer	Asher Tay	Nominated	
Star Awards	2026	Most Emotional Performance	Jesseca Liu	Won	
Star Awards	2026	Most Emotional Performance	Chen Liping	Nominated	
Star Awards	2026	Most Emotional Performance	Chantalle Ng	Nominated	
Star Awards	2026	Most Emotional Performance	Asher Tay	Nominated	
Star Awards	2026	Most Hated Villain	Chantalle Ng	Won	
Star Awards	2026	Most Hated Villain	Dawn Yeoh	Nominated	
Star Awards	2026	Most Hated Villain	Romeo Tan	Nominated	
Star Awards	2026	Favourite CP	Tasha Low and Zhang Zetong	Won	
Star Awards	2026	Favourite CP	Jesseca Liu and Hsiu Chieh-Kai	Nominated	
Star Awards	2026	Favourite CP	Dawn Yeoh and Romeo Tan	Nominated	
Star Awards	2026	Favourite CP	Tasha Low and Tyler Ten	Nominated	

== Legacy ==
The sarong kebayas worn by Jeanette Aw, Tasha Low, Chantalle Ng, and Ferlyn Wong in the series, as well as the beaded shoes and other items, were donated by Mediacorp to the Peranakan Museum in Singapore, and subsequently placed on display.
