= Jernelle Oh =

Singaporean actress-host (born 1994)

- Born: 3 July 1994 (age 32); Singapore
- Education: Ngee Ann Polytechnic
- Alma mater: Nanyang Technological University
- Occupations: Actress; host; radio DJ
- Years active: 2019–present
- Musical career
- Member of: 4567

Chinese name
- Traditional Chinese: 胡煜詩
- Simplified Chinese: 胡煜诗
- Hanyu Pinyin: Hú Yùshī

Jernelle Oh Yu Shi (born 3 July 1994) is a Singaporean actress and host who made her debut through the Star Search 2019 where she was one of the 12 finalists in the talent search competition. Oh is the first in her Star Search batch to have received a nomination for Star Awards for Best Actress for her role as Huang Mei Zhen in Cash On Delivery.

== Early life and career ==
Oh attended Ngee Ann Polytechnic where she majored in Chinese media and communication. Oh then went on to obtain a bachelor's degree in linguistics and multilingual studies from Nanyang Technological University. She had worked as a TV extra and English-Chinese tutor before joining Star Search 2019.

A finalist in Star Search 2019, Oh has been cast in vastly different roles. She played a Vietnamese national in My Star Bride (2021) and a Thai woman in long-form drama The Heartland Hero (2021). In 2023, she played a food delivery worker with cerebral palsy in Cash on Delivery, where the character was based on a real-life person.

In 2021, Mediacorp's artiste management arm The Celebrity Agency created the girl group "4567", where Oh was part of the group with Gini Chang, Juin Teh and Seow Sin Nee.

In mid-August 2023, Oh started her guest-hosting gig on the news radio station Capital 95.8FM.

== Filmography ==
Oh has appeared in the following programmes and films:

=== Television series ===
Year	Title	Role	Notes	Ref.
2013	Crimewatch	Kai Wen	S27 Ep. 3	
2015	Crimewatch	Feng Jianyu	S29 Ep. 4	
2016	Crimewatch		S30 Ep. 2	
2020	Crimewatch	IO Nicole	S34 Ep. 9	
2020	All Around You	Reporter Xiao Zhen		
2021	The Heartland Hero	Cai Lai		
2021	My Star Bride	Hu Xianglan (Ho Huong Lan)		
2021	Mr Zhou's Ghost Stories@Job Haunting''	Eileen	S1 Ep. 7–8, 10	
2022	Soul Doctor			
2022	Healing Heroes			
2022	I’m Actor, Ah De	May		
2023	Cash on Delivery	Huang Meizhen		
2023	The Sky is Still Blue	Tang Xiuya		
2023	Crimewatch	IO Ivy	S37 Ep. 8	
2024	Love on a Shoestring	Kai Di		
2025	Emerald Hill - The Little Nyonya Story (小娘惹之翡翠山)	Ah Hua		

=== Web series ===
Year	Title	Role	Notes	Ref.
2018	Demystifying TV			
2020	Who's The Better Actor?			

=== Variety and reality show ===
Year	Title	Notes	Ref.
2020	Deals for Joy		
2021–present	#JustSwipeLah	Web series	
2022	Silver Carnival 2022		
2022	House Everything?	S2	
2023	Star Awards 2023 Backstage Live		
2023	The Star Athlete		
2023	Silver Carnival 2023		
2023	4567 JB Makan Lobang	Web series	
2023	Pasar Malam Stars		

=== Radio hosting ===
- Capital 95.8FM - 城市007 (2023-14 May 2024; every Thursday 12pm-2pm)

== Awards and nominations ==
Year	Award	Category	Nominated work	Result	Ref.
2022	Star Awards	Most Attention Seeking New-Gen Host	#JustSwipeLah	Nominated	
2023	Star Awards	Top 3 Most Popular Rising Stars	—N/a	Nominated	
2023	Star Awards	Best Rising Star	#JustSwipeLah	Nominated	
2023	Asian Academy Creative Awards	Best Actress in a Leading Role (national winner - Singapore)	Cash on Delivery	Won	
2024	Star Awards	Best Actress	Cash on Delivery (as Huang Mei Zhen)	Nominated	
2024	Star Awards	Top 3 Most Popular Rising Stars	—N/a	Won	
2024	Star Awards	MY PICK Favourite Show Stealer	Cash on Delivery (as Huang Mei Zhen)	Nominated	
2025	Star Awards	Top 3 Most Popular Rising Stars	—N/a	Nominated	
