= Tyler Ten =

Singaporean actor (born 1996)

- Born: 19 March 1996 (age 30); Singapore
- Other name: Deng Weide
- Education: Jurongville Secondary School; Singapore Polytechnic
- Alma mater: Singapore Institute of Management
- Occupations: Actor; TikTok personality; model; martial arts instructor
- Years active: 2019−present
- Musical career
- Member of: HST
- Modeling information
- Height: 1.9 m (6 ft 3 in)
- Hair color: Black
- Eye color: Black

Chinese name
- Traditional Chinese: 鄧偉德
- Simplified Chinese: 邓伟德
- Hanyu Pinyin: Dèng Wěidé

Tyler Ten (born 19 March 1996) is a Singaporean actor, model and martial arts instructor.

== Early life and education ==
Ten's father is an engineer and his mother helps out at a drinks stall. He has an older brother who works in the automotive industry.

Ten practised Muay Thai from a young age and won his first competition at age 14. He is also trained in bodybuilding and is a martial arts instructor. Before becoming an actor and model, Ten was also a waiter and did mascot jobs.

Ten studied at Jurongville Secondary School and then studied interior design at Singapore Polytechnic. He attended Singapore Institute of Management studying marketing while juggling acting commitments.

== Career ==
Ten is also a model and was formerly signed to modelling agency NOW Model Management.

In 2019, Ten participated in Mediacorp Star Search in 2019, and was one of the top 12 finalists. He was cast in the Channel 8 drama series All Around You in the same year.

Ten had played minor roles in the television series Key Witness, Super Dad, Watch Out! Alexius, and Mister Flower.

In 2021, Ten scored his first leading role in the firefighting-themed drama series In Safe Hands. Shortly after in 2022, he went on to appear in more television series, including playing the role of an army officer in When Duty Calls 2 and a nurse in You Can Be An Angel 4 .

In 2023, Ten appeared in the drama series Strike Gold and played a social worker in Family Ties. He was also cast in the blockbuster series All That Glitters.

Ten, Herman Keh and Zhai Siming are members of the group "HST", formed by Mediacorp's artiste management arm The Celebrity Agency in 2021.

== Filmography ==
Ten has appeared in the following shows:

=== Television series ===
Year	Title	Role	Notes	Ref.
2019	All Around You	Calvin Ong		
2020	Watch out! Alexius			
2020	A Quest to Heal	Derrick		
2020	Interns' Survivor Guide			
2020	Mister Flower			
2020	Super Dad	Tim		
2021	In Safe Hands	Jayden Chee		
2021	Key Witness			
2022	When Duty Calls 2	Zeng Anqing		
2022	You Can Be An Angel 4	Fang Jinxiang		
2022	Mr Zhou's Ghost Stories@Job Haunting II	Sean	S2. Ep.3–4	
2023	Strike Gold	Ray		
2023	Family Ties	Lin Jianan		
2023	All That Glitters	Sudsakorn		
2023	I Do, Do I?	Ma Jiabao		
2024	Love on a Shoestring	Chen Shi		
2024	Unforgivable			
2025	Emerald Hill - The Little Nyonya Story	Bai Ah Li		

== Discography ==
=== Compilation albums ===
Year	English title	Mandarin title	Ref
2021	MediaCorp Music Lunar New Year Album 21	新传媒群星福满牛年Moo Moo 乐	
2022	MediaCorp Music Lunar New Year Album 22	新传媒群星旺虎泰哥迎春乐	

== Awards and nominations ==
Organisation	Year	Category	Nominated work	Result	Ref.
Star Awards	2023	Top 3 Most Popular Rising Stars	—N/a	Nominated	
Star Awards	2024	Top 3 Most Popular Rising Stars	—N/a	Nominated	
Star Awards	2025	Best Rising Star	Unforgivable	Won	
Star Awards	2025	Top 3 Most Popular Rising Stars	—N/a	Won	
Star Awards	2025	Favourite CP	I Do, Do I?	Nominated (Note: Shared with Ferlyn Wong)	
Star Awards	2026	Best Supporting Actor	Emerald Hill - The Little Nyonya Story	Won	
Star Awards	2026	Top 3 Most Popular Rising Stars	—N/a	Won	
Star Awards	2026	Favourite CP	Emerald Hill - The Little Nyonya Story	Nominated (Note: Shared with Tasha Low)	
