= Kill Sera Sera =

Singaporean television series

- Traditional Chinese: 誰殺了她
- Simplified Chinese: 谁杀了她
- Literal meaning: "Who Killed Her"
- Hanyu Pinyin: Shéi shāle tā
- Genre: Erotic thriller; Crime; Mystery
- Written by: Rebecca Leow
- Starring: Jessica Hsuan; James Wen; Christopher Lee; Xu Bin; Chantalle Ng
- Country of origin: Singapore
- Original language: Mandarin
- No. of seasons: 1
- No. of episodes: 12

Production
- Executive producer: Chow Wai Thong
- Running time: 46 minutes
- Production company: August Pictures

Original release
- Network: Channel 8; meWATCH
- Release: April 2024 – 2024

Kill Sera Sera (Chinese: 谁杀了她) is a Singaporean crime mystery television series starring Jessica Hsuan, James Wen, Christopher Lee, Xu Bin, Chantalle Ng, Damien Teo, Kiki Lim, Zhang Xinxiang and Lynn Lim. Produced by August Pictures, the series premiered in January 2024 and aired on Singapore meWATCH.

== Cast ==
=== Main and supporting ===
- Jessica Hsuan as May Shaw Ruoyun
- Christopher Lee as Allan Sun Ailun
- James Wen as Zhang Yage
- Xu Bin as Lin Guoguang
- Chantalle Ng as Sera Sun Shanqi
- Damien Teo as Sun Shanwen
- Kiki Lim as Zhang Tingting
- Zhang Xinxiang as Fu Dashu
- Lynn Lim as Ruby

=== Cameo appearances ===
- Terence Cao as Deng Wanhao
- Darren Lim as Sun Dehui
- Chen Huihui as Yu Xin
- Valnice Yek as Cindy
- Lina Ng as Reporter
- Jesseca Liu as Exhibition Boss
- Ian Fang as Paul
- Cynthia Koh as Zhuo Lili
- Mei Xin as Pretty Girl

== Production ==
Filming began in early March 2023.

== Accolades ==
Organisation	Year	Category	Nominee(s)	Result	Ref
Asian Academy Creative Awards	2024	Best Actress in a Supporting Role (National Winners - Singapore)	Lynn Lim	Won	
Asian Academy Creative Awards	2024	Best Editing (National Winners - Singapore)	Cheah Pooi Sin	Won	
Asian Academy Creative Awards	2024	Best Promo of Trailer (National Winners - Singapore)	—N/a	Won	
Asian Academy Creative Awards	2024	Best Screenplay (National Winners - Singapore)	Rebecca Leow	Won	
Asian Television Awards	2024	Best Actor in a Leading Role	Christopher Lee	Nominated	
Asian Television Awards	2024	Best Leading Male Performance - Digital	Christopher Lee	Nominated	
Asian Television Awards	2024	Best Leading Male Performance - Digital	James Wen	Nominated	
Asian Television Awards	2024	Best Leading Female Performance - Digital	Jessica Hsuan	Won	
Asian Television Awards	2024	Best Actress in a Supporting Role	Lynn Lim	Nominated	
Asian Television Awards	2024	Best Original Screenplay	Rebecca Leow	Nominated	
Asian Television Awards	2024	Best Production Design	Jocelyn Tay	Nominated	
Asian Television Awards	2024	Best Original Digital Drama Series	—N/a	Nominated	
Star Awards	2025	Best Actress	Jessica Hsuan	Won	
Star Awards	2025	Best Actor	Christopher Lee	Won	
Star Awards	2025	Best Supporting Actor	Xu Bin	Nominated	
Star Awards	2025	Best Supporting Actress	Lynn Lim	Nominated	
Star Awards	2025	Best Drama Serial	—N/a	Nominated	
