= Cash on Delivery (TV series) =

2023 Singaporean television series

- Promotional poster
- Traditional Chinese: 送餐英雄
- Simplified Chinese: 送餐英雄
- Literal meaning: "Food Delivery Hero"
- Hanyu Pinyin: Sòngcān yīngxióng
- Genre: Drama
- Screenplay by: Lim Gim Lan; Kao Lie Boon
- Directed by: Guo Zhihao
- Starring: Richie Koh; He Ying Ying; Cavin Soh; Jernelle Oh
- Opening theme: "Yi Fen Yi Fen De Ai" by Cavin Soh
- Country of origin: Singapore
- Original language: Mandarin
- No. of seasons: 1
- No. of episodes: 10

Production
- Executive producer: Wu Yulin
- Cinematography: Chen Hongjun
- Editors: Xie Sushan; Li Minghui
- Running time: 45 minutes
- Production company: Mediacorp

Original release
- Network: Channel 8
- Release: 29 May – 9 June 2023

Cash on Delivery (Chinese: 送餐英雄) is a 2023 Singaporean drama series starring Richie Koh, He Ying Ying, Cavin Soh and Jernelle Oh. It tells the stories of food delivery riders during the COVID-19 pandemic circuit breaker period in Singapore. It aired on weeknights 9pm on Mediacorp Channel 8 starting from 29 May 2023.

== Cast ==
- Richie Koh as Lin Juncong
  - Nicholas Lin Daorui as young Juncong
- He Ying Ying as Qiu Siting
- Cavin Soh as Wu Weizhong
- Jernelle Oh as Huang Meizhen
- Jin Yinji as Zhu-ma
- Chen Tianwen as Qian
- Pan Lingling as Luo Lifen
- Peter Yu as Qiu Tian
- Adam Chen as Juncong's father
- Adele Wong as Juncong's mother
- Joy Yak as Luo Yunyun
- Hong Yuheng as Wu Jialiang
- JJ Neo as Serene
- Das DD as Raj
- Xuan Ong as Xiaohuan
- Chen Tianxiang as Elderly man
- Eelyn Kok as Fang Ruishan
- Zhu Yuye as Weizhong's mother

== Awards and nominations ==
Awards	Category	Recipient	Result	Ref.
Asian Academy Creative Awards	Best Actress in a Leading Role (national winner - Singapore)	Jernelle Oh	Won	
Asian Academy Creative Awards	Best Screenplay (national winner - Singapore)	Lim Gim Lan and Kao Lie Boon	Won	
Star Awards 2024	Best Screenplay	Lim Gim Lan and Kao Lie Boon	Nominated	
Star Awards 2024	Young Talent	Ang Yu Heng	Won	
Star Awards 2024	Best Supporting Actress	Jin Yinji	Nominated	
Star Awards 2024	Best Supporting Actor	Peter Yu	Nominated	
Star Awards 2024	Best Actress	Jernelle Oh	Nominated	
Star Awards 2024	Best Actor	Richie Koh	Nominated	
Star Awards 2024	Best Drama Serial	—N/a	Nominated	
Star Awards 2024	The Show Stealer	Richie Koh	Nominated	
Star Awards 2024	The Show Stealer	Jernelle Oh	Nominated	
Star Awards 2024	Favourite CP	Richie Koh & He Ying Ying	Nominated	
