= Star Awards 2025 =

Singaporean television award ceremony

Star Awards 2025 红星 30
- Date: 6 July 2025 (Main Ceremony)
- Location: MES Theatre @ Mediacorp
- Country: Singapore
- Hosted by: Backstage: Jeff Goh; Chen Ning; Gao Meigui; Walk of Fame: Dennis Chew; Herman Keh; Hazelle Teo; Denise Camillia Tan; Main show: Guo Liang; Chantalle Ng; Post-Party: Jeff Goh; Dennis Chew; Herman Keh; Chen Ning; Gao Meigui

Highlights
- Most awards: Unforgivable (3)
- Most nominations: Unforgivable (10)
- Formal Awards: All-time Favourite Artiste: Pornsak; Yvonne Lim; Special Achievement Award: Christopher Lee

Television/radio coverage
- Network: Astro AEC; Astro GO; Mediacorp Channel 8 Mediacorp Channel U mewatch YouTube
- Runtime: Awards Ceremony: 175 mins Walk-of-fame: 90 mins Post-Party: 28 mins

The 30th installment of Star Awards, Star Awards 2025, honoured the best in Singaporean Mandarin television programming in 2024. The ceremony was held on 6 July 2025 with Channel 8, Channel U airing the show and simulcast on mewatch and YouTube. The ceremony was the first to be held outside April since the revision of the nomination period in 2008, as it was announced to be postponed to 6 July on its initial announcement on 11 February due to the 2025 general election, which coincided with the celebration themes.

Crime drama Unforgivable won three awards during the ceremony, which were Best Drama Serial, as well as Rising Star and Supporting Actor, going to Tyler Ten and Chen Hanwei respectively. Kill Sera Sera won both the lead actor and actress roles, played by Christopher Lee and Jessica Hsuan respectively, the former also won three individual awards that night including Best Programme Host for his third season of his show Dishing With Chris Lee, and Special Achievement Award. In popularity awards, Zong Zijie won his first Top 10 Most Favourite Artiste while Tyler Ten won his first Most Popular Rising Star award, while Romeo Tan and Carrie Wong completed their tenth award into the Top 10 Most Favourite Artistes. Pornsak and Yvonne Lim were inducted as the year's All-Time Favourite Artistes.

== Background ==
Star Awards 2025 marked the 30th anniversary of the annual Singaporean television awards ceremony, themed "Walking Through Time Together." The event celebrated three decades of local entertainment, reflecting on past milestones, present achievements, and future aspirations. This milestone edition highlighted the enduring bond between Mediacorp and its audiences, featuring a star-studded lineup of local and international artistes who came together to honour the contributions of Singapore's media professionals.

As with previous ceremonies, the Walk of Fame was aired first at 5pm, before the ceremony commenced at 7pm. The Backstage Live ran concurrently on MeWatch and YouTube, with the ceremony starting at 3.30pm until the ceremony ended. For the first time since 2018, a half-hour Post Party ceremony was held after the ceremony ended.

=== New award categories ===
With BYD joining as a new presenter for Star Awards 2025, two fan-voted categories — Favourite Male and Female Character — were revealed during the Red Carpet show on 6 July 2025. Voting officially closed on 15 June 2025. A voter would be selected via a lucky draw to win a BYD Sealion 7 vehicle.

=== Presenters and performers ===
On 18 June 2025, it was announced that Chantalle Ng would co-host the ceremony along with Guo Liang. This was her debut hosting role.

=== Main ceremony ===
List of performers
Artist(s)	Song(s)
Orchestra V The Versatile Orchestra Group - Singapore	Served as the Orchestral Conductor for the 30th Star Awards
Li Rongde	Served as announcer for the 30th Star Awards
Kit Chan	《家事》from "My Home Affairs (2000)" 《倔强》from "Devotion (2011)" 《落花如雨》 from "Emerald Hill (2025)"

=== Special awards ===
Special Achievement Award
Awards presented by: Josephine Teo
Minister for Digital Development and Information of Singapore
Christopher Lee

When the Star Awards began in 1994, the Special Achievement Award emerged as an honour — bestowed each year to celebrate those whose unwavering brilliance has illuminated the path through decades of excellence.

== Winners and nominees ==
Winners are listed first and highlighted in boldface.

‡ The award is presented to the producer(s) of the drama or programme.

Best Actor Presented by: Sean Lau	Best Actress Presented by: Sean Lau
**Christopher Lee / Kill Sera Sera**: Andie Chen / Born to Shine; Gavin Teo / To Be Loved; Qi Yuwu / Once Upon A New Year's Eve; Richie Koh / Coded Love	**Jessica Hsuan / Kill Sera Sera**: Chantalle Ng / Hope Afloat; Felicia Chin / I Do, Do I?; Hong Ling / Unforgivable; Jesseca Liu / Unforgivable
Best Supporting Actor Presented by: Zheng Geping, Qi Yuwu, Tay Pinghui	Best Supporting Actress Presented by: Xiang Yun, Chen Liping
**Chen Hanwei / Unforgivable**: Chen Shu Cheng / Unforgivable; Guo Liang / To Be Loved; Pierre Png / Moments; Xu Bin / Kill Sera Sera	**Cynthia Koh / Hope Afloat**: Lynn Lim / Kill Sera Sera; Mei Xin / Born to Shine; Tasha Low / Coded Love; Ya Hui / Coded Love
Young Talent Award Presented by: Rebecca Lim, Elvin Ng	Best Rising Star Presented by: Huang Biren, Chen Hanwei
**Lincoln Ang / Born to Shine**: Camans Kong / Born to Shine; Charlotte Chen / Unforgivable; Elvis Shi / Unforgivable; Goh Wee Ann / Born to Shine	**Tyler Ten / Unforgivable**: Herman Keh / House Everything (season 3); Joey Tay / YES 933 TikTok Live; Juin Teh / Unforgivable; Ye Jia Yun / Uniquely Ours
Best Audio Personality Presented by: Dasmond Koh, Dennis Chew	Best Programme Host Presented by: Mark Lee, Quan Yifong
**Zhong Kun Hua / The Shuang, Kunz, Jia Trio**: Chen Ning / The DAKA Show; Hazelle Teo / The Shuang, Kunz, Jia Trio; Pan Jia Biao / CAPITAL 958 Wake Up Call; Zhu Zeliang / The Night is Young	**Christopher Lee / Dishing With Chris Lee (season 2)**: Bryan Wong / Makan On Wheels; Hazelle Teo / Star Awards 2024 – Walk of Fame; Jeremy Chan / Double J BAEcation; Joanne Peh / A Conversation with Minister
Best Entertainment Programme Presented by: Sharon Au, Kym Ng, Bryan Wong	Best Infotainment Programme Presented by: Sharon Au, Kym Ng, Bryan Wong
**Dishing With Chris Lee (season 2) ‡**: King of Culinary (season 4); Makan On Wheels; Pasar Malam Stars; Star Awards 2024 – Award Ceremony	**Legends of Singapore Comedy ‡**: Old Taste Detective (season 5); Tuesday Report - Restart; Women Behind Bars; World's Unique Neighbourhoods
Best Drama Serial Presented by: Fann Wong, Li Nanxing, Zoe Tay	Best Theme Song Presented by: Kit Chan
**Unforgivable ‡**: Born to Shine; Kill Sera Sera; Once Upon A New Year's Eve; To Be Loved	**《残念》/ Once Upon A New Year's Eve by Jim Lim**: 《孺子可教也》/ Born to Shine by Matthew Teng, Lincoln Ang, Bernice Lok, Chen Rui En; 《不同世界的你》/ I Do, Do I? by Ling Kai; 《伤口》/ Unforgivable by Jurine Chia Xin Ni; 《虚构》/ Coded Love by Colbie Ong
Best Radio Programme Presented by: Dasmond Koh, Dennis Chew	Best Short-Form Entertainment Programme Presented by: Vivian Lai, Ann Kok
**YES 933 - The Shuang, Kunz, Jia Trio ‡**: CAPITAL 958 - Wake Up Call; LOVE 972 - Breakfast Quartet; LOVE 972 - Mr. Zhou's Ghost Stories; YES 933 - The DAKA Show	**#JustSwipeLah ‡**: Behind The Lens: Star Search (season 12) in Focus; Outcast: Battle Of The Stars; The DAKA Show (season 2); Yes933 Drama-tainment Series

=== All-Time Favourite Artiste awards ===
The All-Time Favourite Artiste award is given to celebrities who have won the Top 10 Most Popular category 10 times.

- Pornsak – for wins spanning 2009, 2011, 2013–2015, 2017–2021, and 2024.
- Yvonne Lim – for wins spanning 1998, 2009–2014, 2021, 2022, and 2024.

=== Voting awards ===
Three voting categories were also included in this ceremony, the Top 10 Most Popular Male/Female Artistes and Most Popular Rising Stars (eligible for amateur and fresh celebrities), first introduced in 2023. There were 43 artistes eligible for Rising Star, and 60 Male and 62 Female artistes for the Top 10 awards. The Rising Star Award is counted as equivalent to a Most Popular Artiste award. Artistes who have won the Most Popular Artiste Award ten times — including three Rising Star Award wins — will be conferred the All-Time Favourite Artiste title and will no longer be eligible for future Top 10 nominations. Additionally, artistes who win the Rising Star Award three times will automatically be included in the Top 10 Most Popular Artistes list.

Public voting was done via a registered meConnect account. Depending on the award category, the public may be entitled to one, three or ten votes and may submit an unlimited number of votes on 6 July depending on the award category. The public voting period for all awards with public voting ended on 15 June 2025 except for the Top 10 Most Popular Artiste and the Most Popular Rising Stars awards which ended on 6 July 2025.

**Most Popular Rising Stars**
**Award presenter:** **Joanne Peh, Jesseca Liu, Jeannette Aw, Felicia Chin**; Award winner audited by PwC Singapore
Top 3 winners	No. of awards
Ayden Sng	**3**
Tyler Ten	**1**
Zhang Ze Tong	**2**

Table key
10	Winner of 10th award to be named All-Time Favourite Artiste at next ceremony

**Top 10 Most Popular Male Artistes**
**Award presenter: Chow Yun-fat**
Top 10 winners	No. of awards
Romeo Tan	10
Xu Bin	6
Jeremy Chan	3
Jeff Goh	3
Benjamin Tan	2
Zong Zijie	1
Marcus Chin	5
Desmond Tan	9
Richie Koh	2
Guo Liang	9

**Top 10 Most Popular Female Artistes**
**Award presenter: Chow Yun-Fat**
Top 10 winners	No. of awards
Ya Hui	9
Chen Ning	3
Denise Camillia Tan	2
Chantalle Ng	4
Carrie Wong	10
Chen Biyu	3
Gao Mei Gui	2
Tasha Low	3
Hong Ling	4
Paige Chua	9

=== MY PICK awards ===
The My Pick awards segment at Star Awards 2025 featured 6 fan-voted categories, including The Show Stealer, Favourite CP, and Most Emotional Character. Three new categories presented by sponsors include the Bioskin Most Charismatic Award, BYD Favourite Male Character, and BYD Favourite Female Character.

The Show Stealer 最吸晴角色	Most Emotional Performance 最赚人热泪奖
**Jesseca Liu / Unforgivable as Gao Shuya**: Richie Koh / Coded Love as Lu Xiaoming; Chantalle Ng / Hope Afloat as Xu Tianqing; Qi Yuwu / Once Upon a New Year's Eve as Cai Yiren; Hong Ling / Unforgivable as Guan Lin	**Hong Ling / Unforgivable as Guan Lin**: Cheryl Chou / Furever Yours as Zhang Wenyu; Qi Yuwu / Once Upon a New Year's Eve as Cai Yiren; Liu Ling Ling / To Be Loved as Liu Junhong; Jesseca Liu / Unforgivable as Gao Shuya
Favourite CP (Note: Couple Pairing is abbreviated to CP)
**Chantalle Ng and Zhang Zetong / Hope Afloat as Xu Tianqing and Cheng Changfeng**: Ferlyn Wong and Tyler Ten / I Do, Do I? as Jiang Yihua and Ma Jiabao; Paige Chua and Desmond Tan / Moments as Gu Yuexin and Zhan Hefeng; Jesseca Liu and Qi Yuwu / Once Upon a New Year's Eve as Zhou Chenxi / Yuan Jie and Cai Yiren; Xixi Lim and James Seah / The Blockbusters as Bree and YY

Series that received multiple MY PICK! nominations and awards
Nominations	Awards	Series
4	2	Unforgivable
3	0	Once Upon a New Year's Eve
2	1	Hope Afloat

=== Sponsored awards ===
BYD Favourite Male and Female Character awards
The winners of the BYD Favourite Male and Female Character Awards were determined entirely by public voting. Winners were announced during the Star Awards 2025 – Walk Of Fame event.

比亚迪最喜爱男角色 BYD Favourite Male Character Award	比亚迪最喜爱女角色 BYD Favourite Female Character Award
**Romeo Tan / Mr Zhou's Ghost Stories@Job Haunting III**	**Carrie Wong / Coded Love**

As part of the live event, a lucky draw was conducted and the BYD Sealion 7 was awarded to one of the audience members selected during the show. The winner, a randomly selected attendee, was announced on stage as part of the fan engagement segment.

Awards provided by Bioskins Singapore

Bioskin Most Charismatic Artiste Award
Bioskin 魅力四射奖

**Chantalle Ng**

- He Ying Ying
- James Seah
- Jeremy Chan
- Zhang Zetong

=== Interactive category ===
During the live broadcast of the Star Awards on 6 July, viewers were able to participate in interactive segments, including live call-ins through Backstage Live, voting for the night's "Best Dressed" celebrities, and engaging in real-time polls. These interactive features were accessible via QR codes shown on Channel 8 and Channel U, on-screen prompts on meWATCH, and announcements made by the programme hosts.

Hallyu
Best Dressed 最佳着装	Elvin Ng; Jeanette Aw

== Multiple nominations and awards ==
=== Drama with multiple nominations and awards ===
Drama with multiple nominations
Nomination	Drama
10	Unforgivable
7	Born to Shine
5	Kill Sera Sera
4	Coded Love
3	Once Upon A New Year's Eve
3	To Be Loved
2	I Do, Do I?
2	Hope Afloat

Drama with multiple wins
Awards	Series
3	Unforgivable
2	Kill Sera Sera

=== Programme with multiple nominations and awards ===
Programme with multiple nominations
Nomination	Programme
3	The DAKA Show
2	The Shuang, Kunz, Jia Trio
2	Dishing with Chris Lee (Season 2)

Programme with multiple wins
Awards	Programme
2	The Shuang, Kunz, Jia Trio
2	Dishing with Chris Lee (Season 2)

=== Individuals with three or more nominations ===
Nominations	Individual
6	Jesseca Liu
5
5	Qi Yuwu
5	Chantelle Ng
5	Hong Ling
5	Zhang Zetong
5	James Seah
4	Paige Chua
3	Andie Chen
3	Christopher Lee
3	Liu Lingling
3	Gavin Teo
3	Richie Koh
3	Jessica Hsuan
3	Xu Bin
3	Zong Zijie
3	Tasha Low
3	XiXi Lim
3	Yahui
3	Tyler Tan
3	Jeremy Chan
3	He Yingying
3	Hazelle Teo
3	Cheryl Chou
3	Zhai Siming

== Judging panels ==
=== Programme eligibility criteria ===
All programmes commissioned and/or produced by Mediacorp for at least one of the following:

Mediacorp-owned and operated platforms, and/or Mediacorp-operated third-party platforms, such as:

- Television: Channel 8, Channel U
- Radio: CAPITAL 958, LOVE 972, YES 933
- Digital: meWATCH, meLISTEN
- Music streaming: Mediacorp channels on Spotify and Apple Music
- Online video: Mediacorp YouTube channels

The qualifying period was from 1 January 2024 to 31 December 2024, with programmes released during this period considered eligible for Star Awards 2025.

Members	Position
Alice Kwan 管雪梅	Veteran Journalist
Angeline Poh	Chief Customer & Corporate Development Officer, Mediacorp
Billy Koh 许环良	Founder & Chief Executive Officer, Amuse Rights Management
Chang Long Jong 章能容	Chief Executive Officer, mm2 Asia
Colin Goh 吴剑峰	Managing Director, Ocean Butterfly
Elaine Chan	Theatre Composer, Arranger & Director, The Voice Company
Eva Feng 馮英琪	Vice President, KKTV
Hanes Chin	Head of Content, FriDay
Janine Stein	Editorial Director, ContentAsia
Jesslyn Wong	Head of Content Distribution, Mediacorp
Kevin Foo 付传艺	Chief Operating Officer of Content, Commercial & Channel Business, Media Prima
Lawrence Cheng 郑丹瑞	Director & Screenwriter
Lee Ee Wurn 李仪文	Programme Director, Singapore Chinese Cultural Centre
Lee Hung Sheng 李鸿升	Head of Audience & Partnership, Mediacorp
Lenny Leong	Senior Assistant Vice President, Astro
Li Si Song 李偲菘	Composer, Music Producer & Founder, Lee Wei Song School of Music
Lim Puay Keem 林培琴	Head of Chinese Entertainment Production, Mediacorp
Man Shu Sum 文树森	Media Veteran & Associate Director, Academy of Film Hong Kong Baptist University
Mannson Yong	Assistant General Manager of Content, 988
Mark Huang	Senior Producer of Production & Development, Warner Bros. Discovery
May-Yi Lee	Factual & Unscripted Production Unit Lead, Warner Bros. Discovery
Nick Tai 戴天易	Head of Content & Artiste Management, TVBS
Sabanitha Shanmugasundram	Head of Commissioning & Community Engagement, Mediacorp
Simone Lum 林美芳	Head of Growth & Audio, Mediacorp
Suzie Wang	Head of Commerce, Mediacorp
Teo Eng Tiong	Course Chair, Ngee Ann Polytechnic Media Studies
Zhou Wei Boon	Programme Director, My FM

== Public response to nominations ==
Jessica Hsuan's Best Actress win and nominations marked a historic moment for the Star Awards, being the first time the accolade was awarded to a non-Mediacorp artiste and non-Singaporean, reflecting a move towards greater inclusivity and transparency in the judging process.

Zhang Yaodong, who had previously been embroiled in a personal scandal and had stepped away from acting, remained a valid nominee for public voting categories due to his appearance in an eligible programme within the qualifying period. However, he did not receive any awards that night.
