= GeTai Challenge =

Singaporean television show

- Genre: Reality television
- Presented by: Pornsak; Wang Weiliang (season 1); Shane Pow (season 1, guest); Desmond Ng (season 2–); Dennis Chew (season 2); Ho Ai Ling (season 2)
- Judges: Chen Hanwei (season 1); Wang Lei; Jim Lim; Liu Lingling
- Country of origin: Singapore
- Original languages: Chinese; Hokkien (season 2)
- No. of seasons: 2
- No. of episodes: 31

Production
- Production locations: Various (auditions); MPC@Khatib (prelude); Arumugam Road (season 2, episode 13-14); Mediacorp TV Theatre; Resorts World Sentosa (finals, season 1)
- Running time: 50-160 minutes

Original release
- Network: Mediacorp Channel 8
- Release: 22 May 2015 – 10 August 2018

Related
- Campus SuperStar; Project SuperStar; The Voice of China; Sing! China; I Am a Singer; Happy Can Already! 4 Eat Already? 4

GeTai Challenge (GTC, Chinese: 歌台星力量; pinyin: Gē Tái Xīng Lìliàng) is a singing talent search competition for renowned getai singers organised by Mediacorp and broadcast on Channel 8 in Singapore. The show began on 22 May 2015 and ended on 17 August 2015. A second season was renewed in 2018 with the show collaborated with Ministry of Communications and Information; the second season premiered on 20 April 2018 and ended on 10 August 2018.

The concept of GeTai Challenge aims to promote the culture of getai in Singapore, and to find aspiring singers coming from the Getai industry; those singers were put together to compete for the GeTai Challenge title where the winner is determined by the judges' score itself. The winners of two currently aired seasons were Desmond Ng and Angie Lau. Winners received a S$20,000 cash prize and a trophy.

The series employs a panel of judges who critique the contestants' performances. Veteran Getai singers Wang Lei and Liu Lingling, and Singaporean composer Jim Lim were appointed as the show's judges. Other guest judges featured in the show include actors Chen Hanwei, Irene Ang, Tosh Zhang, Cavin Soh, Royston Tan, and musicians Allen Moo, Eric Moo and Daniel Luo. Mediacorp host Pornsak and former winner Desmond Ng were the current emcees of the show, with Wang Weiliang and Shane Pow previously taking hosting roles. Dennis Chew and Ho Ai Ling took supporting hosts during season 2, for segments promoting the community.

== Format ==
Breaking a tradition to reality competitions, instead of having live shows, all of the shows were taped throughout the course of the season, with the show airing usually a few weeks later. Most of the competition was usually held at the Mediacorp Studios, but some of the weeks were taped on different locations, which include MPC@Khatib, Arumugam Road and Resorts World Sentosa.

The competition begins on auditions which Getai singers performed one or more songs, and judges decided on which 10 (season 1) or 20 (season 2) singers advanced to the main show. Those singers undergo various stages of the competition lasting 13 (season 1) or 17 (season 2) weeks. At the end of each performance, judges assigned the singers a score of up of 100 (with increments of 0.1). Similar to other singing competitions, each week shows were usually assigned to a theme. Throughout the course of the season, singers either with the lowest score or were not saved by the judges are progressively eliminated in some weeks until the competition is down to the final six (season 1) or five (season 2); at that point the singers then compete for the title of GeTai Challenge champion.

The competition have various stages that tests the singer's skill, which typically include:

- Prelude Episode (前奏): An exhibition performance held at MPC@Khatib, which showcased the entire cast of the season plus selected singers from former seasons. The showcase was broadcast on the premiere episode and no eliminations were held.
- Themed Cumulative Round (积分主题赛): A series of rounds last between four and six weeks (though singers have to perform only two to four shows), with scores from each singer accumulating throughout each show. Singers with the lowest cumulative score as of the last cumulative round would be eliminated.
- Battle Rounds (PK战): A round which follow similarities to the Crossover Pairing rounds as seen in The Voice of China (season 4) and Sing! China (season 1), where singers compete head to head with another singer from the opposing team. Scoring from this round still apply, and all the contestant's scores are added up to the group's final score which determine the team/contestant's status quo. A similar variant of Battle Round was seen in the Top 9 rounds of season 2, with singers battled against the season 1 finalists, and no scores are used in this round. The contestants whose part of the winning group (or battle winners) directly advanced to the next round, while singers from the losing group (or battle losers) are either put through to another elimination round (usually Second Chance Sing-off) or was eliminated from the competition, which was decided based on the scores received from prior rounds or from the judges' decision alone.
- Second Chance Sing-off (二度考验): Singers failing to fulfil a certain criteria during the previous elimination round (such as being defeated from the Battle Round) but was saved by the judges participated in a sing-off, where singers sang for their lives to stay in the competition. The sing-off was also titled "Breakthrough" (突破赛) during the Top 8 rounds on Season 2.
- Judges' Voting Round (评审投票): Occurred in the Season 1 Semi-finals and Season 2 Preliminary Rounds, in-lieu of traditional scoring format, each judge would use their smartphone devices to decide whether the contestant was awarded a vote by flashing the show's logo. Singers who fail to receive enough votes were placed under the "Pending Zone" (待定区) where they may face elimination.
- Popularity Round (人气赛): As seen in the Top 7 rounds on Season 2 in a format similar to the elimination rounds from I Am a Singer, singers performed for a 300-member audience who will then cast their one-vote to a particular singer. The scores are weighed in favour of the total valid votes and added towards the judge's scores.

== Series overview ==
To date, two seasons have been broadcast, as summarised below.

Season	Start	Finish	Episodes	Contestants	Winner	Runner-up	Third place	Main hosts	Guest/Supporting hosts	Main judges	Guest judges
1	22 May 2015	17 August 2015	14	10	Desmond Ng	Marcus Chin	Hao Hao	Pornsak; Wang Weiliang	Shane Pow	Chen Hanwei; Wang Lei; Jim Lim; Liu Lingling	Irene Ang; Tosh Zhang; Allen Moo; Eric Moo
2	20 April 2018	10 August 2018	17	20	Angie Lau	Jason Chung	Jessie Yeong	Pornsak; Desmond Ng	Dennis Chew; Ho Ai Ling	Wang Lei; Jim Lim; Liu Lingling	Irene Ang; Daniel Luo; Royston Tan; Cavin Soh

=== Season 1 (2015) ===
The first season of GeTai Challenge premiered on 20 May 2015 and ended on 17 August 2015, with the grand finals aired 16 August 2015 at Resorts World Sentosa. A total of 10 singers participated in the competition.

Desmond Ng was announced the winner of the season, while Marcus Chin, Hao Hao, Michelle Choo, Wina Xie and Lee Baoen placed second, third, fourth, fifth and sixth, respectively.

=== Season 2 (2018) ===
The second season of GeTai Challenge (stylised as GeTai Challenge 2018- Heng Ong Huat (Chinese: 歌台星力量-兴旺发; pinyin: Gē Tái Xīng Lìliàng-XīngWàng Fā)) which was sponsored by the Ministry of Communications and Information, premiered on 20 April 2018 and ended on 10 August 2018. This season featured 20 (an increase from 10) singers cast in the competition; they were coached and battled with all but one (Wina Xie) of the season 1 finalists. The show also changed its timeslot from Monday 8.00pm to Friday 11.30am, allowing to cater the program for the elderly, and was broadcast mostly in Hokkien dialect, despite being a Chinese program.

Angie Lau was announced the winner of the season, while Jason Chung, Jessie Yeong, Zhuang Qing Yu and Cola Lau placed second, third, fourth and fifth, respectively.

== Accolades ==
Organisation	Year	Category	Nominees	Result	Ref.
Star Awards	2016	Best Variety Producer	Gan Bee Khim 颜美琴	Nominated	
Star Awards	2016	Best Variety Research Writer	Rachel Han Xinru 韩欣如	Nominated	
Star Awards	2016	Best Variety Programme	—N/a	Won	
Star Awards	2016	Best Variety Special	GeTai Challenge 2015: The Ultimate Battle 歌台星力量-决战今夜	Won	
Star Awards	2016	Best Programme Host (Variety, Info-Ed & Infotainment)	Pornsak	Nominated	
Star Awards	2016	Top Rated Variety Programme	—N/a	Won	
Star Awards	2019	Best Variety Producer	Rachel Han Xinru 韩欣如	Nominated	
Star Awards	2019	Best Variety Programme	—N/a	Won	
Star Awards	2019	Best Variety Special	GeTai Challenge 2018 Grand Finals 歌台星力量-大决赛	Nominated	
