= Star Awards for Best Variety Programme =

Singaporean television award

Star Awards for Best Variety Programme 最佳综艺节目
- Current: Star Awards 2025
- Awarded for: Best overall performance in a Mediacorp variety programme
- Country: Singapore
- Presented by: Mediacorp
- First award: 1998
- Currently held by: Dishing With Chris Lee (season 2) (2025)

The Star Awards for Best Variety Programme is an award presented annually at the Star Awards, a ceremony that was established in 1994.

The category was introduced in 1998, at the 5th Star Awards ceremony; Comedy Night received the award and it is given in honour of a Mediacorp variety programme which has delivered an outstanding overall performance. The nominees are determined by a team of judges employed by Mediacorp; winners are selected by a majority vote from the entire judging panel.

Since its inception, the award has been given to 23 variety programmes. Dishing With Chris Lee (season 2) is the most recent winner in this category. Since the ceremony held in 2019, City Beat, The Joy Truck, Say It If You Dare and GeTai Challenge remain as the only four variety programmes to win in this category twice. In addition, City Beat has been nominated on five occasions, more than any other variety programme. Food Source holds the record for most nominations without a win, with three.

== Recipients ==
Year	Title	Nominees	Ref
1998	Comedy Night 搞笑行动	City Beat 城人杂志; Battle of the Best 强中自有强中手; Yidu Kongjian 异度空间; Yanqing Youyue 嬿青有约	
1999	City Beat 城人杂志	Battle of the Best 强中自有强中手; Comedy Night 搞笑行动; Juedui Xingwen 绝对星闻; Travel Hunt 奇趣搜搜搜	
2000	City Beat 城人杂志	Affairs of the Heart 心手相连; Battle of the Best 强中自有强中手; NKF Charity Show 2000- MediaCorp Artistes 群星照亮千万心- 新传媒人齐献力; Travel Hunt 奇趣搜搜搜	
2001	Who Wants To Be A Millionaire? 百万大赢家	Celebrity Squares 名人Tic Tac Toe; City Beat 城人杂志; Food Glorious Food 大小通吃; Top Fun 欢乐巅峰	
2002	The Mission 创业无敌手	City Beat 城人杂志; Sweet and Sour Talk 美味天王; Top Fun 欢乐巅峰; Who Wants To Be A Millionaire? 百万大赢家	
2003	Innocent Moment 小小儿戏	Comedy Night 2003 搞笑行动2003; Kin-ergy 亲劲十足; The Mission II 创业无敌手II; Who Wants To Be A Millionaire? 百万大赢家	
2004	Creatively Mine 我是创新王	Barter Trade 物物大交换; Maid to Order 明星好帮手; School Belle and the Beau 流星校园; True Colours 秀出真我	
2005	Say It If You Dare 有话好好说	101 Shopping Guide 陪你去Shopping; Love Bites 缘来就是你; Rail Adventure 男得风光; Shoot! 有话就说	
2006	Home Decor Survivor 摆家乐	Dollar and Sense 神机妙算; My Star Guide 我的导游是明星; Property Classified 吉屋出售; Where the Queue Starts 排排站，查查看	
2007	Say It If You Dare 3 有话好好说3	Adventure Clicks 代你看世界; Code Red 爱上小红点; I Cook For You 名厨上菜; Star Search 2007 才华横溢出新秀2007	
2009	Life Transformers 心晴大动员	Buzzing Cashier 抢摊大行动; CelebriTEA Break 艺点心思; King of Thrift 2 SMART省钱王 2; Star Chef 2 至尊厨王2; SuperBand 非常SuperBand	
2010	It's A Small World 国记交意所	3-Plus-1 II 三菜一汤II; CelebriTEA Break 2 艺点心思2; Destination Most Wanted 优游天下; Paris and Milan 女王本色	
2011	Love On A Plate 名厨出走记	Dream Potter 梦．窑匠; Food Source 食在好源头; Gatekeepers 小兵迎大将; Going Home 回家走走	
2012	Renaissance 旧欢.心爱	Food Source 食在好源头; Going Home 回家走走; Mission Possible 小村大任务; Rail Thrill 铁路次文化	
2013	Body SOS 小毛病 大问题	Jobs Around the World 走遍天涯打工乐; Star Reunion 那些年，我们一起看电视; Street Smart 自由脚步; United Neighbours Society 邻里合作社	
2014	The Joy Truck 快乐速递	Say It! 好好说 慢慢讲; Finding U 寻U先锋; Counter Fake 识货衙门; Campus SuperStar 2013 校园 Superstar 2013	
2015	The Joy Truck 快乐速递	Back to School 超龄插班生; Body SOS 小毛病 大问题; Food Source 食在好源头; Neighbourhood Chef 邻里厨王	
2016	Ge Tai Challenge 歌台星力量	Body SOS 小毛病 大问题; The Games We Played 那些年，我们一起玩的游戏; Little Shops 小店铺; Love On A Plate 3 名厨出走记3	
2017	Hearts & Hugs 爱心72小时	BENGpire 黑黑真好玩; Chefs on Wheels 大厨驾到; The 4 Chefs 4 大名厨; Happy Can Already! 欢喜就好	
2018	Ah Ma Can Cook 阿嫲来做饭	I Love You Mum Challenge - A Gift for Mum 大声说出我爱你 - 妈妈的礼物; Oh My Heroes! 超人那里找 ？; Take A Break! 说走就走~短假游; The Love 97.2 Breakfast Quartet 玉建煌崇 电视版	
2019	GeTai Challenge 2018 歌台星力量 兴旺发	By Your Side 谢谢你不离不弃; Dennis Uncovers 周公找茶; Taste of Love 两代美味关系; Thrift Hunters 我赚到了!	
2021	King of Culinary 三把刀	Ah Gong Can Cook 阿公来做饭; Beyond The Cameras 我是媒体人; Hawker Academy 小贩学院; House Everything? 家简尘除; The Destined One S2 众里寻一2; Yi Fong & Eleanor's Kitchen 怡凤和妹妹的厨房	
2022	The Inner Circle 神秘嘉宾	Creme De La Creme 糖朝冠冕; Curious City 小岛国 大发现; Hear U Out S2 权听你说 2; Towkay, Take a Break 街坊请关照	
2023	Dishing with Chris Lee 阿顺有煮意	A Night Under The Stars 陪你看星星; Hear U Out S3 权听你说 3; House Everything? S2 家简尘除2; King Of Culinary 三把刀	
2024	Foodie Trio 三吃客	Battle of the Buskers - Grand Final 游走的歌王-大决赛; Hear U Out S4 权听你说 4; The Reunion 小团剧; The Star Athlete 星牌运动员	
2025	Dishing With Chris Lee S2 《阿顺有煮意》2	King of Culinary S4 三把刀 4; Makan On Wheels 开着餐车趴趴走; Pasar Malam Stars 开档咯! 夜市星手; Star Awards 2024 – Award Ceremony 红星大奖2024 颁奖典礼	
2026	Emerald Hill - Our Hillside Moments	Camping Around The World; Makan On Wheels S2; Mr Zhou's Ghost Stories @ Singapore Sightings S2; Murder on the Menu	

^{^[I]} Each year is linked to the article about the Star Awards held that year.

== Category facts ==
Most wins

Rank	1st
Variety Programme	City Beat; GeTai Challenge; The Joy Truck; Say It If You Dare
Total wins	2 wins

Most nominations

Rank	1st	2nd	3rd
Variety Programme	City Beat	Battle of the Best; Body SOS; Comedy Night; Food Source; Who Wants To Be A Millionaire?	CelebriTEA Break; GeTai Challenge; Going Home; The Joy Truck; Love On A Plate; Say It If You Dare; The Mission; Top Fun; Travel Hunt
Total nominations	5 nominations	3 nominations	2 nominations

== See also ==
- Star Awards
- Star Awards for Best Variety Show Host
