= GeTai Challenge season 1 =

First season of the Singaporean reality-singing competition

GeTai Challenge
- Season 1
- Hosted by: Pornsak; Wang Weiliang (Episode 1, 4-13); Shane Pow (Episode 2-3)
- Judges: Chen Hanwei; Jim Lim; Liu Lingling; Wang Lei; Irene Ang (guest); Tosh Zhang (guest); Allen Moo (guest); Eric Moo (guest)
- No. of contestants: 20
- Winner: Desmond Ng 黄振隆
- Runner-up: Marcus Chin 陈建彬
- Finals venue: Resorts World Sentosa

Release
- Original network: MediaCorp Channel 8
- Original release: 25 May – 17 August 2015

Season chronology
- Next → Season 2

GeTai Challenge 2015 (Chinese: 歌台星力量; pinyin: Gē Tái Xīng Lìliàng) is the first season of Singaporean singing reality competition GeTai Challenge that premiered on 25 May 2015 and run for 13 weeks, with the finals taped at Resorts World Sentosa on 13 August 2015 and ended on 17 August 2015. The competition features Getai singers from all across Singapore competing out for the title of GeTai Challenge winner. The show was hosted by Pornsak and Wang Weiliang, and guest host Shane Pow on two performance shows at Yishun.

On 16 August 2015, MediaCorp actor Desmond Ng was named the winner of GeTai Challenge and won a $20,000 cash award, with Love 97.2FM radio personality and actor Marcus Chin as runner-up and won $10,000. Taiwanese Getai singer Hao Hao, Mingzhu Sisters band member Michelle Choo, Indonesian Getai singer Wina Xie, and Malaysian Getai singer Lee Baoen were named third, fourth, fifth and sixth place, respectively. However, the finale drew criticism after a news article about the results was leaked out on The Straits Times the day before the finals was broadcast, causing a dismay among the netizens due to its spoiler nature.

Due to the success of the program and winning three major variety show awards in Star Awards 2016, the show was renewed for a second season, which premiered on 20 April 2018.

== Development ==
The first season of GeTai Challenge was first announced in March 2015 and as a part of Singapore's golden jubilee celebrations. The show was notable for becoming the first show to be Getai-themed. Auditions were held in February 2015 and ten singers were chosen as the finalists of the show.

== Contestants ==
The ten singers were announced on May.

Singer Name	Chinese	Age	Notability (known for)	Getai Experience	Status
2Z Sisters	2Z姐妹	16-18	Nanyang Technology University undergraduates	8 years	Eliminated 1st Eliminated on 6 July 2015
The Babes	宝贝姐妹	31-33	Veteran Getai band singers	17 years	Eliminated 1st Eliminated on 6 July 2015
Leon & Febe	承泽秀萍	25-33	Married couple	1 year	Eliminated 2nd Eliminated on 10 August 2015
Sherraine Law	罗翊绮	22	Student/Blogger	5 years	Eliminated 2nd Eliminated on 10 August 2015
Lee Baoen	李宝恩	23	Malaysian Getai singer	9 years	Sixth Place on 16 August 2015
Wina Xie	谢伟娜	20	Student/Indonesian Getai singer	8 years	Fifth Place on 16 August 2015
Michelle Choo	朱莉莉	52	Band member, Ming Zhu Sisters	48 years	Fourth Place on 16 August 2015
Hao Hao	皓皓	34	Taiwanese Getai singer	20 years	Third Place on 16 August 2015
Marcus Chin	陈建彬	61	Love 97.2FM radio personality/Television actor	38 years	Runner-up on 16 August 2015
Desmond Ng	黄振隆	28	Television actor/Stage host	5 years	Winner on 16 August 2015

== Scoring chart ==
The highest score (or received all five judge's votes in the semifinals) each week is indicated in bold green with a dagger (†), while the lowest score each week (or received three out of five judge's votes in the semifinals) is indicated in italicized red with a double-dagger (‡).

Color key:

Winner
Runner-up
Third place
Fourth place
Fifth place
Sixth place
Did not perform that week
Judge's save/lost Battle
Eliminated

GeTai Challenge (season 1) - Weekly scores
Singer	Pl.	Week										
Singer	Pl.	1					2		3	4		
Singer	Pl.	Week 1	Week 2	Week 3	Week 4	1+2+3+4	PK	SC	3	Round 1	Round 2	1+2
Desmond Ng	1st	71.7	79	**80**†	80	310.7	81.1	**88**†	**5**†	**90.2**†	**95.8**†	**186**† (Note: This singer finished in first place.)
Marcus Chin	2nd	**86.3**†	77	72.3	**80.5**†	**316.1**†	81.8	N/A	**5**†	88.6	92.4	181 (Note: This singer finished in second place.)
Hao Hao	3rd	81.3	73‡	77.5	77.9	309.7	**83.3**†	N/A	3†	87	89	176 (Note: This singer finished in third place.)
Michelle Choo	4th	70‡	**89.4**†	76	78.5	313.9	80.3	86.3	**5**†	**90.2**†	85.4‡	175.6‡ (Note: This singer finished in fourth place.)
Wina Xie	5th	79.7	78.7	66.5	74.5	299.4	75.8	79.3‡	3†	86.8 (Note: This singer finished in fifth place.)		
Lee Baoen	6th	82.7	74.7	71.8	68.5	297.4	74.8‡	N/A	4	82.4‡ (Note: This singer finished in sixth place.)		
Leon & Febe	7th-8th	77.3	84.8	65.8‡	71.8	299.7	75.5	N/A	3† (Note: This singer was eliminated.)			
Sherraine Law	7th-8th	76	83	67	68‡	294	75.5	81.8	3†			
The Babes	9th-10th	73.7	76	67.8	75	292.5						
2Z Sisters	9th-10th	71	77.7	69.8	68‡	286.5†						

== Televised Show Details ==
=== Week 1- Prelude (25 May) ===
Week one features showcases of the ten performers and all three resident judges, Chen Hanwei, Liu Lingling and Wang Lei. The prelude showcase, along with the next two weeks, were taped at MPC@Khatib. Member of Parliament for Nee Soon GRC, and Parliament Secretary of Health and Transport Associate Professor Muhammad Faishal Ibrahim made his appearance for this episode.

- Group Performances: "热情的沙漠" (Liu Lingling, Wang Lei, Leon & Febe, Marcus Chin, Michelle Choo, Hao Hao, Lee Baoen, Desmond Ng), "Rolling In the Deep" (Sherraine Law, Wina Xie, The Babes, 2Z Sisters), "一人一半" (Top 10)

Act	Order	Song
The Babes and 2Z Sisters	1	"真情"
Lee Baoen and Leon & Febe	2	"征服"
Desmond Ng and Sherraine Law	3	"屋顶"
Marcus Chin and Michelle Choo	4	"就在今夜"
Hao Hao and Wina Xie (with Liu Lingling and Wang Lei)	5	"你是我的花朵"/"小苹果"

=== Week 2/3- Themed Cumulative Round 1 (1/8 June) ===
Starting from week two, the ten singers will be judged based on their performance and assigned a score. The first four weeks will see singers split into two groups of five, each performing on either odd or even-numbered weeks, and then the singers performed together after week five. The scores were accumulated until week seven, and the two singers receiving the two lowest cumulative scores after six weeks will be eliminated from the competition. Getai organisers Tang Hu and Aaron Tan made their guest appearances on Week 2, followed by Love 97.2FM radio personalities Violet Chen and Chua Lilian on Week 3. Host Wang Weiliang was absent for the next two shows; actor Shane Pow took over him as the guest host.

- Theme: Salute to Youths (dubbed as "Black Monday")

Week	Act	Order	Song	Score
Week 2 (1 June)	Michelle Choo	1	"幸福要自己去闯"	70
Week 2 (1 June)	Desmond Ng	2	"没离开过"	71.7
Week 2 (1 June)	2Z Sisters	3	"说唱脸谱"	71
Week 2 (1 June)	Wina Xie	4	"大海"	79.7
Week 2 (1 June)	Hao Hao	5	"你冷得像风"	81.3
Week 3 (8 June)	The Babes	1	"冬天里的一把火"	73
Week 3 (8 June)	Sherraine Law	2	"细水长流"	76
Week 3 (8 June)	Leon & Febe	3	"天黑黑"	77.3
Week 3 (8 June)	Lee Baoen	4	"说不出的快活"/"我要你的爱"	82.7
Week 3 (8 June)	Marcus Chin	5	"请你再说一篇"	86.3

Singer's Score as of Week Three
Rank	Act	Cumulative Score
1	Marcus Chin	86.3
2	Lee Baoen	82.7
3	Hao Hao	81.3
4	Wina Xie	79.7
5	Leon & Febe	77.3
6	Sherraine Law	76
7	The Babes	73.7
8	Desmond Ng	71.7
9	2Z Sisters	71
10	Michelle Choo	70

=== Week 4/5- Themed Cumulative Round 2 (15/22 June) ===
Week four marks the first show to be taped inside the MediaCorp Campus at Caldecott, and also the debut of the fourth resident judge Jim Lim. The performance order was determined through the scores on their first performance, starting from the highest scorer. Chinese singer Ling Xiao made their appearance on Week 4, and Getai singers Lin Ruping and Hsu Chiung-Fang on Week 5.

- Group Performances: "你是我的花朵" (Week 4 singers), "姑娘的酒窝" (Week 5 singers)
- Theme: Songs for their Loved Ones

Week	Act	Order	Song	Score
Week 4 (15 June)	Hao Hao	1	"千言万语"	73
Week 4 (15 June)	Wina Xie	2	"爱什么稀罕"	78.7
Week 4 (15 June)	Desmond Ng	3	"孙悟空"	79
Week 4 (15 June)	2Z Sisters	4	"Don’t Touch Me"	77.7
Week 4 (15 June)	Michelle Choo	5	"至少还有你"	89.4
Week 5 (22 June)	Marcus Chin	1	"天亮了"	77
Week 5 (22 June)	Lee Baoen	2	"火柴天堂"	74.7
Week 5 (22 June)	Leon & Febe	3	"亲爱的小孩"	84.8
Week 5 (22 June)	Sherraine Law	4	"外面的世界"	83
Week 5 (22 June)	The Babes	5	"酒无倘卖无"	76

Singer's Score as of Week Five
Rank	Act	Cumulative Score
1	Marcus Chin	163.3
2	Leon & Febe	162.1
3	Michelle Choo	159.4
4	Sherraine Law	159
5	Wina Xie	158.4
6	Lee Baoen	157.4
7	Hao Hao	154.3
8	Desmond Ng	150.7
9	The Babes	149.7
10	2Z Sisters	148.7

=== Week 6- Themed Cumulative Round 3 (29 June) ===
For the next two weeks, two contestants were assigned as pairs to perform a duet. The first week were assigned by the production, and the second week through contestant's decision. The scores for both round was judged individually after each duet. Chen Hanwei was absent in the judging role for the next five weeks; FLY Entertainment artiste Irene Ang took his role for the judging panel for this week. Classic musician Chung Gu and band member John Teo made their appearance this week.

- Group Performances: "爱神"
- Theme: Contestants' duets: designated duets

Act	Order	Song	Score
Wina Xie	1	"离歌"	66.5
Leon & Febe	1	"离歌"	65.8
Sherraine Law	2	"夏天的浪花"	67
The Babes	2	"夏天的浪花"	67.8
Hao Hao	3	"当"	77.5
Desmond Ng	3	"当"	80
Michelle Choo	4	"把握"	76
2Z Sisters	4	"把握"	69.8
Marcus Chin	5	"High歌"	72.3
Lee Baoen	5	"High歌"	71.8

Singer's Score as of Week Six
Rank	Act	Cumulative Score
1	Marcus Chin	235.6
2	Michelle Choo	235.4
3	Hao Hao	231.8
4	Desmond Ng	230.7
5	Lee Baoen	229.2
6	Leon & Febe	227.6
7	Sherraine Law	226
8	Wina Xie	224.9
9	2Z Sisters	218.5
10	The Babes	217.5

=== Week 7- Themed Cumulative Round 4 (6 July) ===
Two acts were eliminated during the seventh week of shows, based on the cumulative scores as of this week. Students from Ngee Ann Polytechnic made their appearance this week.

- Group Performances: "好好爱我"
- Theme: Contestants' duets: freely-chosen songs

Act	Order	Song	Score
Marcus Chin	1	"大门"	80.5
Michelle Choo	1	"大门"	78.5
Lee Baoen	2	"王妃"	68.5
Leon & Febe	2	"王妃"	71.8
Sherraine Law	3	"I Believe I Can Fly"	68
2Z Sisters	3	"I Believe I Can Fly"	68
Desmond Ng	4	"拒绝再玩"	80
Wina Xie	4	"拒绝再玩"	74.5
Hao Hao	5	"忘情森巴扇"	77.9
The Babes	5	"忘情森巴扇"	75

Singer's Score as of Week Seven
Rank	Act	Cumulative Score	Results
1	Marcus Chin	316.1	Safe
2	Michelle Choo	313.9	Safe
3	Desmond Ng	310.7	Safe
4	Hao Hao	309.7	Safe
5	Leon & Febe	299.7	Safe
6	Wina Xie	299.4	Safe
7	Lee Baoen	297.7	Safe
8	Sherraine Law	294	Safe
9	The Babes	292.5	Eliminated
10	2Z Sisters	286.5	Eliminated

=== Week 8/9- Battle Rounds (13/20 July) ===
The Battle rounds was split into two episodes, and the round saw eight singers assigned into two groups of four. In this battle round, a singer would be sent by his or her teammates to compete against another singer from the opposing team. The selection of the singer and their order of appearance were all decided by their respective teams, and all of which were done without the knowledge of the opposing team. Therefore, the pairings were completely by random, and would only be revealed when the teams revealed their selection on stage. At the end of each match, the winning singer will earn the right to decide whether the singer will perform first or second. At the end of all four matches, the group with a higher combined total will directly advance to the semi-finals, while singers from the losing group would have to compete in the Second Chance Judges Challenge next week. Additionally, the scores for the prior round were reset. Ah Boys to Men actor Tosh Zhang was brought in as the guest judge.

- Group Performances: "失恋阵线联盟"
- Theme: "Four hands fights" (No theme)

Color key

**Bold**	– Singer was the first to perform
	Singer won the match (judges' score)
	The group with a higher score and all the members advanced to the semi-finals
	The group with a lower score and all the members had to perform again in the Second Chance Judges Challenge

Episode	Order	Team A			Team B		
Episode	Order	Singer	Song	Score	Singer	Song	Score
Week 8 (13 July)	1	**Marcus Chin**	**"Deluian"/"眼光"**	81.8	Michelle Choo	"What's Up?"	80.3
Week 8 (13 July)	2	**Leon & Febe**	**"一个人的精彩"**	75.5^{1}	Sherraine Law	"一眼瞬间"	75.5
Week 9 (20 July)	3	**Hao Hao**	**"寒江雪"**	83.3	Desmond Ng	"艾菲尔的骄傲"	81.1
Week 9 (20 July)	4	**Lee Baoen**	**"乡音"/"风筝"**	74.8	Wina Xie	"炫亮"	75.8
Total Score		Team A		315.4	Team B		313.1

1. Won by a Rock–paper–scissors tiebreaker.

=== Week 10- Second Chance Judges Challenge (27 July) ===
In this round, the four singers who were defeated in the Battle Rounds performed for a chance to stay in the competition. Singers who attained at least 80 points will advance to the semi-finals. Musician Allen Moo was brought in as the guest judge.

- Group Performances: "真心英雄"
- Theme: "Songs to get you to the semi-final" (no theme, dubbed as "Real gold is not afraid of the fire")

Color key

Singer scored at least 80 points and advanced to the semi-finals

Contestants' performances on the third live show
Act	Order	Song	Score
Sherraine Law	1	"眼泪"	81.8
Wina Xie	2	"如果云知道"	79.3^{1}
Michelle Choo	3	"我等到花儿也谢了"	86.3
Desmond Ng	4	"不让我眼泪我过夜"	88

1. At the end of the challenge, Xie would have been eliminated from the competition after she failed the challenge, but was later advanced to the semi-finals following the audience and judges’ deliberation to bring all the singers to the semi-finals.

=== Week 11/12- Semi-finals (3/10 August) ===
The semi-final round was split into two episodes, with the first five singers performing on the first episode, and the last three on the second episode. For this round, singers a medley of songs which were assigned by the judges, starting off their performances with a ballad, followed by an uptempo song. In deciding who moves on, each judge will cast their vote by flashing the show's logo on their smartphones. Singers receiving a minimum of four (out of five) judges' votes will directly advance to the grand finals; failure to will land them in the Pending Zone, where singers have to perform again in the 90-second sing-off. After the sing-off, the judges choose which two singers advanced to the grand final, and which two singers were to be eliminated. Irene Ang was brought in as the guest judge.

- Group Performances: "给我一个吻"
- Theme: Fast and Slow-tempo medley songs, judges' assigned

Color key

Judge cast a "Yes" vote
Judge cast a "No" vote
Singer received four or more judges' votes and advanced to grand finals
Singer received less than four judges' votes and was placed in the Pending Zone
Singer won the sing-off and advanced to the grand finals
Singer lost the sing-off and was eliminated

Episode	Act	Order	Song	Judges votes					Results
Episode	Act	Order	Song	Lim	Ang	Chen	Liu	Lei	Results
Episode 11 (3 Aug)	Wina Xie	1	"想念你的歌"/"我就是这样"						To Pending Zone
Episode 11 (3 Aug)	Michelle Choo	2	"白天不懂夜的黑"/"慢慢来"						Advanced
Episode 11 (3 Aug)	Sherraine Law	3	"天冷就回来"/"燕尾蝶"						To Pending Zone
Episode 11 (3 Aug)	Lee Baoen	4	"手掌心"/"向天再借五百年"						Advanced
Episode 11 (3 Aug)	Marcus Chin	5	"春天里"/"燃烧吧火鸟"		^{1}	^{1}	^{1}	^{1}	Advanced
Episode 12 (10 Aug)	Desmond Ng	6	"天黑"/"波间带"						Advanced
Episode 12 (10 Aug)	Leon & Febe	7	"天下有情人"/"小夫妻"						To Pending Zone
Episode 12 (10 Aug)	Hao Hao	8	"天空"/"越飞越高"						To Pending Zone
Episode 12 (10 Aug)	Pending Zone (90-second sing-off)								
Episode 12 (10 Aug)	Wina Xie	1	"三天三夜"	Saved					
Episode 12 (10 Aug)	Sherraine Law	2	"雪人"	Eliminated					
Episode 12 (10 Aug)	Leon & Febe	3	"新不了情"	Eliminated					
Episode 12 (10 Aug)	Hao Hao	4	"是否"	Saved					

1. Originally cast as a "No" vote. Chin's results was not revealed until Episode 12 (10 August).

=== Week 13- Grand Finals ===
==== Part 1- The Ultimate Battle (16 August) ====
The grand finals were taped on 13 August 2015 at Resorts World Sentosa and broadcast on a three-hour special starting at 7.00pm. In the first round of the competition, the six finalists performed a duet or trio with celebrities (if any). Based on the judges scores in the first round, the bottom two singers with the lowest judges' score would be eliminated.

The final four singers would then sing their winner's song in the second round of the competition; the singer who received the highest total combined score was announced as the winner. Local musician Eric Moo was brought in as a guest judge. Local musician Lee Wei Song and the cast of Ah Boys to Men made their appearance in the finale. Minister of the Prime Minister Office Chan Chun Sing was the guest-of-honour for the finale.

- Group Performances: "给我感觉" (The Babes, Leon & Febe, Sherraine Law, 2Z Sisters), "至少还有你" (Marcus Chin, Michelle Choo), "爱什么稀罕" (Lee Baoen, Wina Xie), "不让我眼泪我过夜" (Desmond Ng), "寒江雪" (Hao Hao), "跟着感觉走" (Top 10)
- Theme: Celebrity duet (dubbed as "reinforcement round"), winner's song (dubbed as "final battle")
- Guest Performance: Eric Moo ("太傻")

Act	First Round			Second Round			Total	Result
Act	Score	Song	Order	Score	Song	Order	Total	Result
Hao Hao	1	"菊花台" (with Vanessa Voon)	87	7	"Para Para Sakura"	89	176	Third place
Wina Xie	2	"愛要坦蕩蕩" (with Lin Wen-yu)	86.8	N/A (already eliminated)				Fifth place
Marcus Chin	3	"船歌" (with Dong Shi Qiang, Kelvin Soon, Zhang Xiong, Qiu Wen, Hsu Chiung-Fang, Sally Yeo, Mai Hui and Jenny)	88.6	8	"霸王别姬"	92.4	181	Runner-up
Desmond Ng	4	"霍元甲" (with Wang Weiliang)	90.2	10	"父亲"	95.8	186	Winner
Lee Baoen	5	"乌兰巴托的夜" (with Xie Wen)	82.4	N/A (already eliminated)				Sixth place
Michelle Choo	6	"爱的迷恋" (with Choo Lengleng)	90.2	9	"走在红地毯一天"	85.4	175.6	Fourth place

==== Part 2- Finals Special (17 August) ====
The Finals Special was aired the following day of the finale, featuring a clip show as well as a look-back on their journey in the competition, and to celebrate the success of the season and the crowning of the winner. The results for the three voting categories, which opened throughout the season until the semi-finals, was revealed in the episode.

Award	Winner
Best Costume	Hao Hao
Most Popular	Hao Hao
Most Interactive	Desmond Ng
