= Star Awards for Best Variety Research Writer =

Singaporean television award

Star Awards for Best Variety Research Writer 最佳综艺资料撰稿
- Current: Star Awards 2024
- Awarded for: Best Variety Research Writer in Mediacorp Variety show
- Country: Singapore
- Presented by: Mediacorp
- Currently held by: Chua Ing Tze / Curious City S2 (2024)

The Best Variety Research Writer is an award presented annually at the Star Awards, an annual ceremony held in Singapore where the media organisation Mediacorp recognises entertainers under their employment for outstanding performances of the year.

== Recipients ==
Table key
indicates the winner

=== 2010s ===
Year	Best Variety Research Writer	Representative Variety Show	Ref
2016	Lin Shih Han 林诗涵	The Joy Truck 3 快乐速递	
2016	Rachel Han Xinru 韩欣如	GeTai Challenge 歌台星力量	
2016	Sheffie Liang 梁雪慧	Going Home 3 回家走走	
2016	Ng Jin Puay 黄仁佩	The Games We Played 那些年，我们一起玩的游戏	
2016	Evelyn Gow 吴慧玲	The Successor 锁住味道	
2017	Lam Yen Fong 蓝燕芳	As I Hold Your Hand 大手牵老手	
2017	Evelyn Gow 吴慧玲	Lunar New Year Eve Special 2016 灵猴庆丰年	
2017	Lim Kar Yee 林嘉仪	As I Hold Your Hand 大手牵老手	
2017	Seow Zi Xian 萧孜玹	BENGpire 黑黑真好玩	
2017	Wong Eng Hong 王应鸿	Chefs on Wheels 大厨驾到	
2018	Teo Kim Kee 张琴棋	Going Miles, Spreading Smiles 一人行，暖人心	
2018	Evelyn Gow 吴慧玲	Hey Chef! 2 大厨帮帮忙2	
2018	Lam Yen Fong 蓝燕芳	Unique Lodging 不一样的旅店	
2018	Ng Jin Puay 黄仁佩	SPD Charity Show 2017 SPD真情无障爱	
2018	Seow Zi Xian 萧孜玹	Going Miles, Spreading Smiles 一人行，暖人心	
2019	Loong Li Li 龙俐利	Taste of Love 两代美味关系	
2019	Teo Kim Kee 张琴棋	Taste of Nanyang 翻乡找味	
2019	Wong Eng Hong 王应鸿	Home Dining 开门见餐	
2019	Rachel Han Xinru 韩欣如	GeTai Challenge 2018 歌台星力量 兴旺发	
2019	Yu Jiajing 游佳静	SPOP SING! - Grand Final SPOP听我唱！- 大决赛	

=== 2020s ===
Year	Best Variety Research Writer	Representative Variety Show	Ref
2022	Ng Jin Puay 黄仁佩	The Food Lab 科学食验事	
2023	Sheffie Liang 梁雪慧	It's A Small World 2022 国记交意所2022	
2024	Chua Ing Tze 蔡蕴芝	Curious City S2 小岛国大发现 2	
