= GeTai Challenge season 2 =

GeTai Challenge
- Season 2
- Hosted by: Desmond Ng; Pornsak; Dennis Chew; Ho Ai Ling
- Judges: Wang Lei; Jim Lim; Liu Lingling; Irene Ang (guest); Cavin Soh (guest); Royston Tan (guest); Daniel Luo (guest)
- No. of contestants: 20
- Winner: Angie Lau 刘心玲
- Runner-up: Jason Chung 曾詠恒
- Finals venue: MES Theatre, Mediacorp Studios

Release
- Original network: Mediacorp Channel 8
- Original release: 20 April – 10 August 2018

Season chronology
- ← Previous; Season 1

GeTai Challenge 2018 (Chinese: 歌台星力量-兴旺发; pinyin: Gē Tái Xīng Lìliàng-XīngWàng Fā), is the second season of GeTai Challenge, a hit reality-singing competition organised by Mediacorp Channel 8, returning after a three-year hiatus. The second season consist of 17 episodes premiered on Channel 8 on 20 April 2018, with the grand finals taped on 26 July 2018 at MES Theatre and aired on 10 August 2018. For the first time, the episodes were available on catchup on Gov.sg's YouTube channel, in addition to the Toggle website (unlike the last season, all episodes were uploaded) The show was sponsored by the Ministry of Communications and Information.

On 10 August 2018, 50-year old Getai veteran singer and sister of resident judge Liu Lingling, Angie Lau was declared the winner of GeTai Challenge 2018 and took home a $20,000 cash award; 45-year old restaurant owner Jason Chung was named the runner-up and won $10,000. Jessie Yeong finished in third place, while Zhuang Qing Yu and Cola Lau finished in fourth and fifth place respectively; they each won $5,000, $3,000 and $2,000, respectively.

The show won the Best Variety Programme in the Star Awards 2019.

== Development ==
The show was first announced on 12 March 2018 with the auditions happening in February 2018, where Allen Moo and Peter Chen were the judges. Out of hundreds of auditionees with an age range of between 12 and 63, 20 singers were selected and put through to the shows.

The new theme song, "大家兴旺发", was first unveiled to the public during the Lunar New Year Special on 15 February 2018 (Hao Hao and Wina Xie were absent), and their music video was uploaded on YouTube on 6 April 2018. The video was composed by resident judge Jim Lim, lyrics by last season runner-up Marcus Chin, and featured all of the season 1 finalists, except for Wina Xie.

The three judges who were resident judges from the first season, Jim Lim, Liu Lingling and Wang Lei, returned this season, while Chen Hanwei did not return. Pornsak reprises his hosting role, while Desmond Ng, the winner of the last season, replaces Wang Weiliang as the co-host of the show. Two supporting hosts, Dennis Chew and Ho Ai Ling, portrayed their roles of Kachang Puteh Man and Kiam Sng Tee Auntie, respectively, on segments for the community.

Unlike the last season airing on prime-time slot (Mondays at 8 p.m.), the show was aired on every Fridays at 11.30 a.m. Additionally, where GeTai Challenge was a Mandarin Chinese television program, most of the dialogue was presented in Hokkien dialect, similar to another program aired on a morning time-slot Eat Already? and Happy Can Already!.

== Contestants ==
The Top 20 contestants were announced on the premiere episode, as follows:

Singer Name	Chinese	Age	Notability (known for)	Getai Experience	Status
Ah Lun	阿伦	51	Tour guide/Private-hire Taxi driver	10 Years	Eliminated 1st on Top 20; Eliminated on 4 May 2018
Jaspers Lai	Jaspers ^{1}	31	Rapper/Actor, J Team	1 Year	Eliminated 1st on Top 20; Eliminated on 4 May 2018
Shining Sisters	闪亮姐妹	23	Twins/Undergraduates	8 Years	Eliminated 1st on Top 20; Eliminated on 4 May 2018
Anddi Goh	天悦	33	Concert actor/Healthcare Executive	10 Years	Eliminated 2nd on Top 20; Eliminated on 11 May 2018
Liz Low	刘丽芝	30	Housewife/Stage hostess	6 Years	Eliminated 2nd on Top 20; Eliminated on 11 May 2018
Xie Wen	谢温	33	Malaysian-born Getai singer	7 Years	Eliminated 2nd on Top 20; Eliminated on 11 May 2018
Chen Xiao Xin	陈晓欣	34	Teacher	26 Years	Eliminated 3rd on Top 20; Eliminated on 18 May 2018
Raybe Oh	胡秀惠	24	Financial consultant	6 Years	Eliminated 3rd on Top 20; Eliminated on 18 May 2018
Ryan Lian	廖永谊	33	Actor	2 Years	Eliminated 3rd on Top 20; Eliminated on 18 May 2018
Qiu Wen	秋文	63	China-born Getai singer	33 Years	Eliminated 3rd on Top 20; Eliminated on 18 May 2018
Mai Hui	麦卉	53	Stage hostess	30 Years	Eliminated 4th Eliminated on 22 June 2018
Anderene Choo	朱慧真	20	Republic Polytechnic student	6 Years	Eliminated 5th Eliminated on 6 July 2018
Apple Zheng	郑晓慧	23	Nanyang Technology University undergraduate	5 Years	Eliminated 6th Eliminated on 13 July 2018
Jayden Chew	宏扬	30	Stage host/Project SuperStar 2014 Top 10 finalist	9 Years	Eliminated 7th Eliminated on 20 July 2018
Angel Law	罗恩琪	17	Student/Blogger	2 Years	Eliminated 8th Eliminated on 3 August 2018
Cola Lau	阳光可乐	21	Belly dancer/Stage hostess	9 Years	Fifth place on 10 August 2018
Zhuang Qing Yu	庄清玉	50	Private-hire Taxi driver/Renovation contractor	15 Years	Fourth place on 10 August 2018
Jessie Yeong	杨千荭	31	Housewife	22 Years	Third place on 10 August 2018
Jason Chung	曾詠恒	45	Restaurant owner	19 Years	Runner-up on 10 August 2018
Angie Lau	刘心玲	50	Full-time Getai singer	42 Years	Winner on 10 August 2018

Lai's Chinese name was 赖宇涵, but the on-screen captions was displayed as Jaspers instead.

== Scoring chart ==
The highest score (or received all three judge's votes in Top 20) each week is indicated in bold green with a dagger (†), while the lowest score each week (or received none of any judge's votes in Top 20) is indicated in italicized red with a double-dagger (‡).

Color key:

Winner
Runner-up
Third place
Fourth place
Fifth place
Did not perform that week
Judge's save/lost Battle
Eliminated

GeTai Challenge (season 2) - Weekly scores
Singer	Pl.	Week												
Singer	Pl.	1			2			3		4	5	6		
Singer	Pl.	Week 1	Week 2	SC	Top 10	Battle	1+2	PK	BT	4	5	Round 1	Round 2	1+2
Angie Liu	1st	**3**†	N/A	N/A	72.3	**78.3**†	**150.6**†	Lose	**75.7**†	74.3+13.2=87.5	(74+75.2)/2=74.6	**85.5**†	+**97.1**†	=**182.6**† (Note: This singer finished in first place.)
Jason Chong	2nd	**3**†	N/A	N/A	**73.7**†	71.7	145.4	Win	N/A	76.7+18.3=**95**†	(71.3+80.9)/2=76.1	84.2	+92.7‡	=176.9‡ (Note: This singer finished in second place.)
Jessie Yeong	3rd	**3**†	N/A	N/A	70.7	75.7	146.4	Lose	73.7	72.3+16.4=88.7	(78.3+78.9)/2=**78.6**†	80 (Note: This singer finished in third place.)		
Zhuang Qing Yu	4th	2 (Note: This singer was saved by Jim Lim.)	N/A	**81**†	69	75.5	144.5	Win	N/A	73.3+14.8=88.1	(78.3+76.3)/2=77.3	76.2 (Note: This singer finished in fourth place.)		
Cola Lau	5th	N/A	2 (Note: This singer was saved by Wang Lei.)	79	66.2‡	69.7	135.9	Lose	69.7	68.3+12.4=80.7	(74+75.2)/2=74.6	73.4‡ (Note: This singer finished in fifth place.)		
Angel Lau	6th	N/A	**3**†	N/A	69.7	69.5	135.2	Lose	70.7	66.7+21.1=87.8	(71.3+68.5)/2=69.9‡ (Note: This singer was eliminated.)			
Jayden Chew	7th	N/A	**3**†	N/A	68	73.5	141.5	Win	N/A	69.7+4.0=73.7‡				
Apple Zheng	8th	**3**†	N/A	N/A	69.8	67.2	137	Lose	66.7‡					
Anderene Choo	9th	N/A	**3**†	N/A	71.3	71.2	142.5	Lose						
Mai Hui	10th	**3**†	N/A	N/A	70.3	65‡	135.3‡							
Chen Xiao Xin	11th-20th	N/A	2	78										
Qiu Wen	11th-20th	N/A	2 (Note: This singer was saved by Liu Lingling.)	77										
Raybe Oh	11th-20th	N/A	1	70										
Ryan Lian	11th-20th	1	N/A	68‡										
Anddi Goh	11th-20th	N/A	2											
Liz Low	11th-20th	N/A	2											
Xie Wen	11th-20th	N/A	0‡											
Ah Lun	11th-20th	1												
Jaspers Lai	11th-20th	0‡												
Shining Sisters	11th-20th	0‡												

== Show details ==
Unless otherwise stated, all the group performances (except for weeks 2, 9, 14 and 16) at the start of the show were "大家兴旺发", the show's theme song. Starting in Week 3 until 15, the song was shortened to fit in the 1-hour time slot. All season 1 finalists lists only nine of ten finalists, with the exception of Wina Xie.

=== Week 1/2 (20/27 April)- Prelude ===
The first two shows were taped at MPC@Khatib on 6 April 2018, showcasing all the singers' (nine from Season 1 and 20 from Season 2) performances.

Singer	Order	Song
Week 1 (20 April)
All Season 1 finalists	1	"大家兴旺发"
Raybe Oh, Cola Lau and Apple Zheng	2	"好胆你就来"
Jayden Chew and Jason Chung	3	"友情岁月"
Zhuang Qing Yu, Mai Hui and Ah Lun	4	"有影无"
Angie Lau and Qiu Wen	5	"两忘烟水里"
Hao Hao, Leon & Febe, The Babes and Desmond Ng	6	"山顶黑狗兄"
Week 2 (27 April)
All Season 2 finalists (with Desmond Ng)	7	"红日"
Sherraine Law, Lee Baoen and 2Z Sisters	8	"墓仔埔也敢去"
Liz Low, Jessie Yeong and Chen Xiao Xin	9	"追追追"
Michelle Choo and Marcus Chin	10	"世界始终你好"
Anderene Choo, Shining Sisters and Angel Law	11	"一人一半感情不散"
Jaspers Lai, Ryan Lian, Anddi Goh and Xie Wen (with 16 Season 2 finalists)	12	"世界第一等"

=== Week 3/4 (4/11 May)- Battle For Top 10 (Part 1)- Preliminary Rounds ===
This is the first show of the season to be taped at Mediacorp Studios at 1 Stars Avenue. For the next two weeks, 20 singers were paired up and performed with one of nine Season 1 singers (Leon & Febe paired with four singers instead of two) to vie for the 10 spots in the next round. The result was decided solely through judges' votes; judges cast their vote through their tablet device by flashing either one of the three Heng Ong Huat logos. Singers receiving all three judges' votes would directly advance to the top 10, but singers receiving only one or two judges' votes will land them into Pending Zone, where they were eligible to be saved from the judges' immunity (each immunity may be used once on each show). Singers either receiving no judges' votes or were not saved by the judges from the Pending Zone, will be eliminated from the competition.

- Theme: Alumni duets (billed as "Duet with Seniors")

Color key

Judge cast their "Heng Ong Huat" vote
Judge did not cast their "Heng Ong Huat" vote
Singer received all three judges' votes and advanced to Top 10
Singer received the judge's immunity and had to sing again in the Final Round
Singer did not receive the judge's immunity and was eliminated
Singer received no judges' vote and was eliminated immediately

Week	Singer	Order	Song	Judges Votes			Results
Week	Singer	Order	Song	Lei	Liu	Lim	Results
Week 3 (4 May)	Zhuang Qing Yu	1	"男人的汗" (with Marcus Chin)				Judge's Immunity Save
Week 3 (4 May)	Ah Lun	1	"男人的汗" (with Marcus Chin)				Eliminated
Week 3 (4 May)	Apple Zheng	2	"阿龙阿花" (with Lee Baoen)				Advanced
Week 3 (4 May)	Ryan Lian	2	"阿龙阿花" (with Lee Baoen)				Judge's Immunity Save
Week 3 (4 May)	Jessie Yeong	3	"相爱很难" (with Desmond Ng)				Advanced
Week 3 (4 May)	Jason Chung	3	"相爱很难" (with Desmond Ng)				Advanced
Week 3 (4 May)	Shining Sisters	4	"燃料"/"独家试唱" (with The Babes)				Eliminated Immediately
Week 3 (4 May)	Jaspers Lai	4	"燃料"/"独家试唱" (with The Babes)				Eliminated Immediately
Week 3 (4 May)	Angie Lau	5	"爱到坎站" (with Michelle Choo)				Advanced
Week 3 (4 May)	Mai Hui	5	"爱到坎站" (with Michelle Choo)				Advanced
Week 4 (11 May)	Qiu Wen	1	"顺流逆流"/"红尘梦" (with Hao Hao)				Judge's Immunity Save
Week 4 (11 May)	Liz Low	1	"顺流逆流"/"红尘梦" (with Hao Hao)				Eliminated
Week 4 (11 May)	Xie Wen	2	"小雨伞" (with Sherraine Law)				Eliminated Immediately
Week 4 (11 May)	Raybe Oh	2	"小雨伞" (with Sherraine Law)				Judge's Immunity Save
Week 4 (11 May)	Angel Law	3	"练武功" (with 2Z Sisters)				Advanced
Week 4 (11 May)	Cola Lau	3	"练武功" (with 2Z Sisters)				Judge's Immunity Save
Week 4 (11 May)	Anderene Choo	4	"梦中的情话" (with Leon & Febe)				Advanced
Week 4 (11 May)	Anddi Goh	4	"梦中的情话" (with Leon & Febe)				Eliminated
Week 4 (11 May)	Chen Xiao Xin	4	"梦中的情话" (with Leon & Febe)				Judge's Immunity Save
Week 4 (11 May)	Jayden Chew	4	"梦中的情话" (with Leon & Febe)				Advanced

=== Week 5 (18 May)- Battle For Top 10 (Part 2)- Final Round ===
The six singers who were saved by the judges will have to face the Final Round to compete for the last two spots in the Top 10. The two singers receiving the two highest scores will advance to the top 10.

- Theme: Contestant's choice (billed as "Songs they were good at")

Color key

Singer received the top two scores and were advanced to top 10

Singer	Order	Song	Score	Results
Raybe Oh	1	"无字的情批"	70	Eliminated
Zhuang Qing Yu	2	"心疼心"	81	Advanced
Ryan Lian	3	"难得有情人"	68	Eliminated
Chen Xiao Xin	4	"今夜搁再想你"	78	Eliminated
Qiu Wen	5	"遥远的她"	77	Eliminated
Cola Lau	6	"叫我女皇"	79	Advanced

=== Week 6/7 (25 May/1 June)- Top 10 Rounds (Part 1)- Themed Rounds ===
Starting from week six, the ten singers will be judged based on their performance and assigned a score, based on Costume, Performance, Presentation (20 each) and Singing Techniques (40). The scores were accumulated until week nine, and the singer receiving the lowest cumulative score afterwards will be eliminated from the competition. For the next four weeks, Jim Lim was absent in his judging role due to work commitments; Mediacorp actor Cavin Soh took his place on the panel.

- Theme: Songs to remember their loved ones (billed as "Those Were The Days" (Week 6) or "What I Miss" (Week 7))

Week	Singer	Order	Song	Score	Rank
Week 6 (25 May)	Angie Lau	1	"命运"	72.3	2
Week 6 (25 May)	Jayden Chew	2	"阿嫲的话"	68	9
Week 6 (25 May)	Anderene Choo	3	"丢丢铜"/"天黑黑"/"祖母的话"	71.3	3
Week 6 (25 May)	Angel Law	4	"阿公的睡床脚"	69.7	7
Week 6 (25 May)	Zhuang Qing Yu	5	"月落"	69	8
Week 7 (1 June)	Jessie Yeong	1	"当年情"	70.7	4
Week 7 (1 June)	Apple Zheng	2	"阿公的故事"	69.8	6
Week 7 (1 June)	Cola Lau	3	"呛身"	66.2	10
Week 7 (1 June)	Mai Hui	4	"阿嫲"	70.3	5
Week 7 (1 June)	Jason Chung	5	"爱情陷阱"	73.7	1

=== Week 8/9 (8/15 June)- Top 10 Rounds (Part 2)- Team Battle ===
The round was split into two episodes with the ten singers assigned into two groups of five. For this battle round, a singer would be sent by his or her teammates to compete against another singer from the opposing team. The selection of the singer and their order of appearance were all decided by their respective teams, and all of which were done without the knowledge of the opposing team. Therefore, the pairings were completely by random, and would only be revealed when the teams revealed their selection on stage. The order of the matchup were done through Rock–paper–scissors, and the winner earned the right to decide the order. At the end of each match, the judges will cast their vote to which singer they liked the most, but those votes does not necessarily affect the outcome of the competition. At the end of all five matches, the group with a higher combined total (based on this round) will directly advance to the next round, while singers from the losing group were eligible for elimination based on the combined scores received from both rounds. FLY Entertainment artist Irene Ang was brought in as the guest judge.

- Theme: The songs of my Life

Color key

**Bold**	– Singer was the first to perform
Italics	– Singer won the rock-paper-scissor and determined the performance order
	Judge cast their vote to the red team
	Judge cast their vote to the blue team
	Judge cast a split vote
	Singer won the match (judges' score)
	The group with a higher score and all the singers advanced to the next round
	The group with a lower score and all the singers were in risk of elimination

Episode	Order	Red Team			Blue Team			Judges' Vote		
Episode	Order	Red Team			Blue Team			Ang	Liu	Lei
Episode	Order	Singer	Song	Score	Singer	Song	Score	Ang	Liu	Lei
Week 8 (8 June)	1	**Jayden Chew**	**"人生的歌"**	73.5	Jason Chung	"追"	71.7			
Week 8 (8 June)	2	**Anderene Choo**	**"思念你的心肝你敢知"**	71.2	Jessie Yeong	"无忌"	75.7			
Week 8 (8 June)	3	**Angel Law**	**"再出发"**	69.5	Apple Zheng	"父母的心声"	67.2			
Week 9 (15 June)	4	**Angie Lau**	**"归来吧"**	78.3	Cola Lau	"欢喜就好"/"财神到"	69.7			
Week 9 (15 June)	5	Zhuang Qing Yu	"蝴蝶"	75.5	**Mai Hui**	**"爱情的骗子公虾米"**	65			
Total Score		Red Team		368	Blue Team		349.3^{1}			

The Blue Team's total score was incorrectly announced as 349.2.

Singer's Score as of Week Nine
Rank	Singer	Score	Result
1	Angie Lau	150.6	Safe
2	Jessie Yeong	146.4	Safe
3	Jason Chung	145.4	Safe
4	Zhuang Qing Yu	144.5	Safe
5	Anderene Choo	142.5	Safe
6	Jayden Chew	141.5	Safe
7	Angel Law	139.2	Safe
8	Apple Zheng	137	Safe
9	Cola Lau	135.9	Safe
10	Mai Hui	135.3	Eliminated

=== Week 10-12 (22/29 June/6 July)- Top 9 Rounds- PK Battle ===
For the next three weeks, the top nine singers faced head-to-head against the Season 1 singers; both the order of performance and their match-up were determined by ballot, with the Season 1 finalist performing first. The results of the battle were not announced until Week 12; victorious singers will directly advance to the top seven rounds; of the defeated singers, the one singer which was not saved by the judges will be eliminated, while the other singers will have to sing again on the Breakthrough round next week. The scores were not used for the results, and scores for the prior round were reset. Top 20 finalist Xie Wen made his cameo appearance during Week 12 episode.

- Theme: No theme

Color key

Singer won the Battle and advanced to the next round
Singer lost the Battle and were required to participate in the Breakthrough round
Singer lost the Battle and was eliminated

Episode	Order	Colour	Season 1 finalists		Season 2 finalists		
Episode	Order	Colour	Singer	Song	Singer	Song	Result
Week 10 (22 June)	1		The Babes	"妝乎水水"	Apple Zheng	"离家"	Lost Battle
Week 10 (22 June)	2		Hao Hao	"舞女"	Angel Law	"走路有风"	Lost Battle
Week 10 (22 June)	3		Michelle Choo	"Monica"/"不羁的风"	Zhuang Qing Yu	"落雨声"	Won Battle
Week 11 (29 June)	4		Leon & Febe	"鼓声若响"	Jessie Yeong	"拒绝再玩"/"无心睡眠"	Lost Battle
Week 11 (29 June)	5		Sherraine Law	"月弯弯"	Cola Lau	"一百万"	Lost Battle
Week 11 (29 June)	6		Desmond Ng	"轧车"	Jason Chung	"让我跟你走"	Won Battle
Week 12 (6 July)	7		2Z Sisters	"欢喜来嚓嚓"	Jayden Chew	"空笑梦"	Won Battle
Week 12 (6 July)	8		Lee Baoen	"黄昏的故乡"	Anderene Choo	"望春风"	Lost Battle/Eliminated
Week 12 (6 July)	9		Marcus Chin	"男儿当自强" (with Golden Age Talentime contestants)	Angie Lau	"明日话今天"	Lost Battle

=== Week 13 (13 July)- Top 8 Round- Breakthrough Round ===
The next two shows were taped at the open field near Arumugam Road at MacPherson for a crowd of 1,200 people. In this round, the five singers who were defeated in the top nine rounds performed for a chance to stay in the competition. The order of performance was decided by the judges. For this week, in addition to the four scoring components, a fifth component, "Breakthrough Index" was added, and each component carries a 20-point weightage. The singer with the lowest score will be eliminated from the competition.

- Theme: Songs to achieve breakthrough

Color key

Singer received the lowest score and was eliminated

Singer	Order	Song	Breakthrough Theme (Normal Theme/Breakthrough)	Score	Result
Apple Zheng	1	"内山姑娘要出嫁"	Slow-tempo dance songs/Rock songs	66.7	Eliminated
Angel Law	2	"我爱雨月花"	Hokkien songs/Rap songs	70.7	Safe
Jessie Yeong	3	"天顶的月娘"	Cantonese songs/Hokkien songs	73.7	Safe
Cola Lau	4	"我爱过"	Uptempo dance Songs/Ballad songs	69.7	Safe
Angie Lau	5	"今晚夜"	Cantonese ballad songs/Uptempo dance songs	75.7	Safe

=== Week 14 (20 July)- Top 7 Round- Popularity Round ===
The top seven performed on this week for a spot in the semi-finals. The order of appearance was decided through the drawing of lots. In deciding who moves on, the three judges; as well as the studio audience made up of 300 members of the public were given an equal say. Each of the voters was entitled to one vote per singer, and they can either choose to vote or not vote for a particular singer. The scores from the judges, as well as the total number of votes cast by studio audience converted into points accordingly to the percentage of the valid votes cast. The singer with the lowest accumulated total points would be eliminated from the competition.

- Theme: No theme

Color key

Singer received the highest accumulated total points and advanced to the semi-finals
Singer received the lowest accumulated total points and was eliminated

Singer	Order	Song	Judges score	Public votes (percentage)^{1}	Total points	Result
Angel Law	1	"天宫疼憨人"	66.7	53 (21.1)	87.8	Safe
Jayden Chew	2	"叫阮的名"	69.7	10 (4.0)	73.7	Eliminated
Angie Lau	3	"随想曲"/"上海滩"	74.3	33 (13.2)	87.5	Safe
Zhuang Qing Yu	4	"三瞑三日"	73.3	37 (14.8)	88.1	Safe
Cola Lau	5	"叉烧包"	68.3	31 (12.4)	80.7	Safe
Jessie Yeong	6	"爱是永恒"	72.3	41 (16.4)	88.7	Safe
Jason Chung	7	"护花使者"/"特务J"	76.7	46 (18.3)	95	Safe

The percentage counting towards the total votes does not include 49 abstained/rejected votes.

=== Week 15/16 (27 July/3 August)- Semi-Finals ===
The Semi-finals was split into two episodes, with the entire first round and the first two singers from the second round performing on the first episode, and the last four on the second episode. In the first round, six singers received their paper cutouts from the producers, which determined their pairing and performance order; the scores for this round (which include Team Chemistry; each component now have a 20-point weightage) were judged based on the duet itself, rather than judging individually (meaning both singers from the same duet were given identical set of scores). In the second round, judge Jim Lim handpicked six songs for the singers to choose from (with the order of choice based on their placement from the Popularity round), and work on a song mixed with two genres – original and designated, with the latter unknown to the contestant's knowledge until the start of the round. The scores for both rounds were combined and calculated by average; normally, the two singers receiving the two lowest scores would be eliminated from the competition; however, after two singers (Angie Lau and Cola Lau) were tied for fourth place, both singers were advanced to the Grand Finals. Director of Getai musical film 881 and music video "大家兴旺发" Royston Tan was brought in as the guest judge.

- Theme: Singer's duets, Jim Lim's choice

Color key

Singer received the highest combined total points and advanced to the grand finals
Singer received the bottom two scores and were eliminated

Singer	Round 1			Round 2				Average Score	Results
Singer	Order	Song	Score	Order	Song	Designated genre	Score	Average Score	Results
Angel Law	1	"心爱的人" (with Jason Chung)	71.3	4	"爱拼才会赢"	Alternative Rock	68.5	69.9	Eliminated
Jason Chung	1	"心爱的人" (with Angel Law)	71.3	9	"一起走过的日子"	Tango	80.9	76.1	Safe
Jessie Yeong	2	"爱着啊" (with Zhuang Qing Yu)	78.3	8	"酒后的心声"	Blues rock	78.9	78.6	Safe
Zhuang Qing Yu	2	"爱着啊" (with Jessie Yeong)	78.3	6	"我问天"	Broadway jazz	76.3	77.3	Safe
Angie Lau	3	"歹势啦" (with Cola Lau)	74	5	"伤心酒店"	Retro	75.2	74.6^{1}	Safe
Cola Lau	3	"歹势啦" (with Angie Lau)	74	7	"天才与白痴"	Jazz	75.2	74.6^{1}	Safe

Tied for fourth place.

=== Week 17 (10 August)- Grand Finals ===
The Grand Finals were taped on 26 July 2018 and broadcast on a two-hour special starting at 10.30 a.m. In the first round of the competition, the five finalists performed a duet with celebrities (if any). Based on the judges scores (40 for singing techniques, 30 each for stage presence and presentation) in the first round, the bottom three singers with the lowest judges' score would be eliminated.

The final two singers would then sing their winner's song in the second round of the competition; the singer who received the highest total combined score was announced as the winner. Actor Cavin Soh and guest singer Daniel Luo were brought in as the guest judges. Senior Minister of State, Information and Communication & Culture, Community and Youth, Sim Ann, was the guest-of-honour for the finale. A special teaser for the talkshow The Love 97.2 Breakfast Quartet - Listen To Me (which premieres the week after) was shown during the closing of the show.

- Theme: Celebrity duets (billed as "reinforcement round"), winner's song (billed as "final battle")
- Group Performance: "海草舞" (all season 1 and 2 finalists except Jason Chung, Angie Lau, Cola Lau, Jessie Yeong and Zhuang Qing Yu)
- Non-competition Performances: Jessie Yeong ("酒后的心声"), Jason Chung ("让我跟你走"), Cola Lau ("一百万"), Zhuang Qing Yu ("蝴蝶"), Angie Lau ("归来吧")
- Musical Guests: Season 1 finalists ("大家兴旺发"), Daniel Luo ("茫茫到更深")

Singer	Round 1			Round 2			Overall Score	Results
Singer	Order	Song	Score	Order	Song	Score	Overall Score	Results
Jessie Yeong	1	"女人胆" (with Meng Yan)	80	N/A (already eliminated)				Third Place
Zhuang Qing Yu	2	"少年梦" (with Chen Xiao Xin)	76.2	N/A (already eliminated)				Fourth Place
Angie Lau	3	"只有情永在"/"铁血丹心" (with Wysom Wong)	85.5	7	"博杯"	97.1	182.6	Winner
Cola Lau	4	"树枝孤鸟" (with Wang Qi Hui)	73.4	N/A (already eliminated)				Fifth Place
Jason Chung	5	"李香兰" (with Allen Moo)	84.2	6	"无言感激"	92.7	176.9	Runner-up
