= Life Hacks =

- 没那么简单
- Genre: Variety
- Presented by: Kym Ng; Pornsak
- Starring: Henry Thia; Pan Lingling; Jeremy Chan
- Voices of: Lin De Cheng
- Country of origin: Singapore
- Original language: Mandarin
- No. of episodes: 13

Production
- Executive producer: Kerry Soh 苏丽英阝
- Producer: 吴永华
- Running time: 30 minutes (with advertisements)

Original release
- Network: Mediacorp Channel 8
- Release: March 22 – June 14, 2016

Related
- Tuesday Report: All In The Family; BENGpire; Touch Screen Cuisine

Life Hacks (Chinese: 没那么简单) is a Mandarin-language variety show produced by Singapore's MediaCorp Channel 8. It is hosted by Kym Ng and Pornsak Prajakwit together with Henry Thia, Pan Lingling and Jeremy Chan. The show shares tips and tricks to make life easier and save money.

== Guests ==
Episode	Guest Artistes	Guest Expert	Original Air Date
1	Bryan Wong; Hong Huifang; Romeo Tan; Zoe Tay	Chan Kim Seng	March 22, 2016
2	Lee Teng; Quan Yi Fong; Ya Hui; Yao Wenlong	Chan Kim Seng	March 29, 2016
3	Hong Huifang; Ian Fang; Quan Yi Fong; Zhang Zhenhuan	Chan Kim Seng	April 5, 2016
4	Elvin Ng; Lee Teng; Sheila Sim; Sora Ma	Khoh Rong Lun	April 12, 2016
5	Bryan Wong; Desmond Tan; Hong Huifang; Quan Yi Fong	Lim Tit Meng	April 19, 2016
6	Bryan Wong; Chen Hanwei; Quan Yi Fong; Romeo Tan	Chan Kim Seng	April 26, 2016
7	Jayley Woo; Lee Teng; Priscelia Chan; Zheng Geping	Lim Tit Meng	May 3, 2016
8	Apple Hong; Carrie Wong; Dennis Chew; Elvin Ng	Khoh Rong Lun	May 10, 2016
9	Ben Yeo; Hong Huifang; Quan Yi Fong; Tay Ping Hui	Chan Kim Seng	May 17, 2016
10	Bryan Wong; Quan Yi Fong; Shane Pow; May Phua	Chan Kim Seng	May 24, 2016
11	Mark Lee; Marcus Chin; Zheng Geping; Vivian Lai	Chan Kim Seng	May 31, 2016
12	Aileen Tan; Hao Hao; Tong Bing Yu; Jeffrey Xu	Lim Tit Meng	June 7, 2016
13	Bryan Wong; Quan Yi Fong; Vivian Lai; Cavin Soh	Lim Tit Meng	June 14, 2016 (Final Episode)

== Show facts ==
Most appearances

Rank	1st	2nd	3rd	4th	5th
Guest Artiste	Quan Yi Fong	Bryan Wong	Hong Huifang	Lee Teng	Vivian Lai; Elvin Ng; Romeo Tan; Zheng Geping
Total appearances	7 appearances	5 appearances	4 appearances	3 appearances	2 appearances

Rank	1st	2nd	3rd
Guest Expert	Chan Kim Seng	Lim Tit Meng	Khoh Rong Lun
Total appearances	7 appearances	4 appearances	2 appearances
