= Star Awards 2024 =

Singaporean television awards

Star Awards 2024 红星大奖 2024
- Date: 15 April 2024 (Show One); 21 April 2024 (Main Ceremony)
- Location: MES Theatre @ Mediacorp
- Country: Singapore
- Hosted by: Show One: Zhu Ze Liang; Xixi Lim; Backstage: Xixi Lim; Yan Wei Xiao Er; Rao Zi Jie; Shawn Thia; Isabelle Quek; Queenie Lim; Walk of Fame: Herman Keh; Hazelle Teo; Jeff Goh; Main show: Dennis Chew; Guo Liang

Highlights
- Most awards: All That Glitters (5)
- Most nominations: All That Glitters (11)
- Best Drama Serial: All That Glitters
- Best Variety Show: Foodie Trio
- Formal Awards: All-time Favourite Artiste: Ann Kok; Jesseca Liu; Special Achievement Award: Mark Lee

Television/radio coverage
- Network: Mediacorp Channel 8 Mediacorp Channel U mewatch YouTube
- Runtime: 143 mins (Awards Ceremony); 67 mins (Walk-of-fame)

The 29th installment of Star Awards, Star Awards 2024 (Chinese: 红星大奖2024), honoured the best in Singaporean prime time television programming in 2023, as chosen by both the television and radio industries of Singapore. The nominations were announced on 22 February 2024, and was presented on 21 April 2024 through multiple channels including streaming websites mewatch and YouTube, which also provided exclusive backstage commentary 3:30 PM to 10:30 PM.

All That Glitters won five awards out of the 11 nominations this ceremony, including Best Drama Serial and the lead (Jeremy Chan) and supporting (Zhang Ze Tong) actor roles, the latter who also won his first of three consecutive Most Popular Rising Star popularity award. Kym Ng and Aileen Tan won the lead and supporting actress roles respectively. In popularity votes, their first Top 10 wins were James Seah, Benjamin Tan and Zhang for the males, and He Ying Ying, Xixi Lim and Jernelle Oh for the females; Oh also won her first Most Popular Rising Star award. Ann Kok and Jesseca Liu, having won their tenth Top 10 Favourite Female Artiste in 2023, were conferred with the All-Time Favourite Artiste Award at this ceremony, while Pornsak and Yvonne Lim, won their tenth Top 10 Favourite Artiste at this ceremony after both missing out of their tenth award last year.

== Background ==
For the 2024 awards, there were three major category changes:

- The Best Evergreen Artiste category will be retired, as Mediacorp believes that artistic excellence surpasses age.
- Star Awards debuts the Best Audio Personality accolade, acknowledging the impactful voices that have become an integral part of daily Singaporean life.
- Merging the Best Entertainment Special Programme and Best Entertainment Programme awards signifies a notable change in honoring the wide array of talents enriching local entertainment.

=== Creative achievement awards ===
Best Director, Best Screenplay, Best Producer (Entertainment), and Best Research Writer (Entertainment) will be announced during the gala programme together with all the programme and series awards which is held at Zouk Singapore on 15 April.

=== Presenters and performers ===
On April 5, 2024, an official announcement was made revealing that actor Dennis Chew will co-host the ceremony.

=== Walk of fame ===
List of performers
Artist(s)	Song(s)
Desmond Ng and Tosh Zhang; Opening Performance	"奔" (Running) Star Awards 2024 Theme Song
Jasmine Sokko	T&C
Desmond Ng and Tosh Zhang	"断舍离" / 整你的人生 Fix My Life by The Freshman 插班生 "来自星际的风" / 欧巴，我爱你! Oppa Saranghae! by Kim Jae Hoon 金在勋 "取暖" / 只此一家 My One and Only by Tay Kewei & Alfred Sim 郑可为, 沈志豪 "觉醒" / SHERO by Ling Kai, Shirlyn Tan 铃凯, Shirlyn Tan "陪到最后" / 陪你到最后 Till The End by Boon Hui Lu 文慧如
Nathan Hartono	In The Clouds + 爱超给电

=== Main ceremony ===
List of performers
Artist(s)	Song(s)
Chao Chuan	"我是一只小小鸟" "爱要怎么说出口" "我很丑可是我很温柔"
Onew	"You Are My Everything" "Your Scent"

=== Special awards ===
Special Achievement Award
特别成就奖
Awards presented by: Tan Kiat How
Senior Minister of State for Communications and Information for Singapore
Mark Lee

The Special Achievement Award is an award presented annually at the Star Awards, a ceremony that was established since 1994. The Special Achievement Award returned after a 5 years hiatus with the last presentation of the Special Achievement Award back in 2019.

== Winners and nominees ==
=== Awards ===
Winners are listed first and highlighted in boldface.

Star Awards 2024 - Creative Achievement Awards (Show One) (15 April 2024)
Best Director	Best Screenplay
**Wong Foong Hwee 黄芬菲 / All That Glitters 金色大道**: Khoo Khiang Ting 丘健廷 / SHERO; Kok Tzyy Haw 郭贽豪 / Till The End 陪你到最后; Png Keh Hock 方傢福 / All That Glitters 金色大道; Rowena Loh 罗薇娜 / Silent Walls 密宅	**Ang Eng Tee 洪荣狄 / All That Glitters 金色大道**: Ang Siew Hoong 翁秀红 / Till The End 陪你到最后; Kate Feng, Rowena Loh 封以恩, 罗薇娜 / Silent Walls 密宅; Lim Gim Lan, Kao Lie Boon 林锦兰, 许丽雯 / Cash on Delivery 送餐英雄; Molby Low, Wong Foong Hwee, Han Yew Kwang, Ng Lee Ling, Lum Yic Teng 刘健财, 黄芬菲, 韩耀光, 黄丽琳, 林逸婷 / Oppa, Saranghae! 欧巴，我爱你!
Best Producer (Entertainment)	Best Research Writer (Entertainment)
**Goh Si Jiau 吴仕佼 / Star Awards 2023 Awards Ceremony 红星大奖 2023 - 颁奖典礼**: Angie Chan 陈安琪 / The Star Athlete 星牌运动员; Eva Cheng 程绮桦 / Hear U Out S4 权听你说 4; Jonathan Tan 陈精通 / Foodie Trio 三吃客; Kang Lay See 江丽丝 / Curious City S2 小岛国大发现 2	**Chua Ing Tze 蔡蕴芝 / Curious City S2 小岛国大发现 2**: Lin Shih Han 林诗涵 / Star Awards 2023 - Awards Ceremony 红星大奖 2023 - 颁奖典礼; Loong Li Li 龙俐利 / Foodie Trio 三吃客; Ng Jin Puay 黄仁佩 / Fashion Refabbed 衣衣不舍; Seow Zi Xian 萧孜玹 / The Star Athlete 星牌运动员
Best Drama Serial	Best Theme Song
**All That Glitters 金色大道**: Cash on Delivery 送餐英雄; Oppa, Saranghae! 欧巴，我爱你!; SHERO; Till The End 陪你到最后	**"来自星际的风" / 欧巴，我爱你! Oppa, Saranghae! by Kim Jae Hoon 金在勋**: "断舍离" / 整你的人生 Fix My Life by The Freshman 插班生; "取暖" / 只此一家 My One and Only by Tay Kewei & Alfred Sim 郑可为, 沈志豪; "觉醒" / SHERO by Ling Kai, Shirlyn Tan 铃凯, Shirlyn Tan; "陪到最后" / 陪你到最后 Till The End by Boon Hui Lu 文慧如
Best Entertainment Programme	Best Infotainment Programme
**Foodie Trio 三吃客**: Battle of the Buskers - Grand Final 游走的歌王-大决赛; Hear U Out S4 权听你说 4; The Reunion 小团剧; The Star Athlete 星牌运动员	**Inside Crime Scene S2 狮城奇案之罪案现场**: Forbidding No More S2 极境之旅; Old Taste Detective S4 古早味侦探 4; Two Worlds Apart 光照不到的角落; Wartime Food 战地食谱
Best Radio Programme	Best Short-Form Entertainment Programme
**The Breakfast Quintet 早安! 玉建蔡煌崇 / LOVE 972**: Mr Zhou's Ghost Stories 周公讲鬼 / LOVE 972; The DAKA Show 大咖一起來 / YES 933; The Shuang and Kunz Show 双节坤 / YES 933; Wake-Up Call 城市早点名 / CAPITAL 958	**#JustSwipeLah 刷一刷**: Fake It Till You Make It 角色风云; KUNZversations 一点都不KUNZ; Singapore True Crimes - An Animation Series 狮城奇案之画说罪案; The DAKA Show 大咖一起来
Star Awards 2024 - Main Ceremony (21 April 2024)
Best Actor (presented by Charmaine Sheh)	Best Actress (presented by Charmaine Sheh)
**Jeremy Chan 田铭耀 / 金色大道 All That Glitters as Huang Jin Tiao 黄金条**: Andie Chen 陈邦鋆 / 密宅 Silent Walls as Zheng Haojie 郑浩杰; Chen Han Wei 陈汉玮 / 天公疼憨人 Whatever Will Be, Will Be as Liu Bi Rang 刘必善; Desmond Tan 陈泂江 / 金色大道 All That Glitters as Lin Mu Sen 林木森; Richie Koh 许瑞奇 / 送餐英雄 Cash on Delivery as Lin Juncong 林俊聪	**Kym Ng 鐘琴 / 陪你到最后 Till The End as Yang Kehua 杨可华**: Chantalle Ng 黄暄婷 / 金色大道 All That Glitters as Li Zhenyu 李珍玉; Jernelle Oh 胡煜诗 / 送餐英雄 Cash on Delivery as Huang Meizhen 黄美真; Joanne Peh 白薇秀 / SHERO as Zhang Yinchen 张尹晨; Rui En 瑞恩 / 欧巴，我爱你! Oppa, Saranghae! as Ouyang Qiqi 欧阳琦琦
Best Supporting Actor (presented by Xiang Yun & Jeanette Aw)	Best Supporting Actress (presented by Xiang Yun & Jeanette Aw)
**Zhang Zetong 张哲通 / 金色大道 All That Glitters as Richard Mo**: Andie Chen 陈邦鋆 / 天公疼憨人 Whatever Will Be, Will Be as Lin Guang Jian 林光建; Darren Lim 林明伦 / SHERO as Dai Guowei 戴国威; Peter Yu 宏荣 / 送餐英雄 Cash on Delivery as Qiu Tian 邱天; Zhu Houren 朱厚任 / 从零开始 Till The End as Li Zhiyin 李智音	**Aileen Tan 陈丽贞 / SHERO as Chen Meihua 陈梅华**: Chen Liping 陈莉萍 / 从零开始 The Sky Is Still Blue as Hong Aixi 洪艾西; Hong Huifang 洪慧芳 / 黄金巨塔 Strike Gold as Jiang Xianhua 蒋娴桦; Jin Yinji 金银姬 / 送餐英雄 Cash on Delivery as Ah Zhu 阿珠; Ya Hui 雅慧 / 家人之间 Family Ties as Yi Xin 易馨
Young Talent Award (presented by Xu Bin & Boon Hui Lu)
**Ang Yu Heng Tesla 洪宇恒 / 送餐英雄 Cash on Delivery as Wu Jia Liang 吴嘉亮**: Alfred Ong 王勇畯 / 金色大道 All That Glitters as Young Lin Musen 小林木森; Chia Zhi Xuan Ivory 谢芷萱 / 金色大道 All That Glitters as Bei Bei 贝贝; Natalie Mae Tan 陈宥蒽 / 金色大道 All That Glitters as Young Xue Min 小学敏; Teo Jing Yuan Andre 张敬元 / 三吃客 Foodie Trio
Best Rising Star (presented by Jasmine Sokko & Nathan Hartono)
**Yunis To 卓芳娴 / Stranger in the Dark 熟悉的陌生人 as Cheryl Sun 孙雨泽**: Hank Wang 王硕瀚 / Stranger in the Dark 熟悉的陌生人 as Yang Junzhe 杨俊哲; Isabelle Quek 郭慧萱 / Curious City S2 小岛国大发现 2; Karyn Wong 黄诗敏 / 游走的歌王 Battle of the Buskers; Yang Yan 杨言 / Stranger in the Dark 熟悉的陌生人 as Jin Xin 金鑫
Best Audio Personality (presented by Chao Chuan)	Best Programme Host (presented by Chao Chuan)
**Dennis Chew 周崇庆 / 早安! 玉建蔡煌崇 The Breakfast Quintet**: Chen Ning 陈宁 / 大咖一起来 The DAKA Show; Hazelle Teo 张颖双 / 双节坤 The Shuang and Kunz Show; Lim Leng Kee 林灵芝 / 城市007 Double-O-7; Kenneth Chung 钟坤华 / 一点都不KUNZ KUNZversations	**Quan Yi Fong 权怡凤 / 权听你说 4 Hear U Out S4**: Chen Shucheng 陈澍城 / 三吃客 Foodie Trio; Darren Lim 林明伦 / 线人 4 Fixer 4; Guo Liang 郭亮 / 惠眼说亮话 The Zoe and Liang Show; Kym Ng 鐘琴 / 古早味侦探 4 Old Taste Detective S4

=== Popularity awards ===
==== All Time Favourite Artiste ====
Award winner	"Top 10 Most Popular Artists" award winning years	Award presenters
**Ann Kok**	1995 | 1996 | 1997 | 1998 | 1999 | 2012 | 2013 | 2014 | **2021** | **2023**	Felicia Chin; Rebecca Lim
**Jesseca Liu**	2006 | 2007 | 2009 | 2010 | 2016 | 2017 | 2019 | **2021** | 2022 | **2023**	Felicia Chin; Rebecca Lim
Note: This honor is awarded to an artist who has amassed a total of ten "Top 10 Most Popular Male / Female Artiste Awards," regardless of whether these awards were won in consecutive years, will be honored with the All-Time Favourite Artiste Award upon securing their tenth popularity award. The same winning years are displayed in **bold**.

==== Top 10 Most Popular Male/Female Artistes ====
To be eligible under the Top 10 awards, an individual must either have a lead role or be the main host in at least one eligible program, or play a supporting role, episodic host (for video), or co-host (for audio) in a minimum of three eligible programs or in at least 30 episodes across all eligible programs. Additionally, eligible personalities must possess over five years of professional experience in screen acting or screen/audio hosting as of 1 January 2023. This experience must not include cameo appearances or any work done before the age of 18.

The final determination of the Top 10 Most Popular Male & Female Artistes will be based on a combination of the outcomes from a popularity survey which will be in a nationwide poll of 1,000 people from Singapore's population, with an equitable breakdown across various age groups, accounting for 20% of the results, and public voting, which will significantly influence the standings with an 80% contribution. The voting period commenced on 18 March 2024 at 12pm. The unlimited voting began on 21 April 2024 at 12am and ended on 21 April 2024 at 7.30pm, offering participants ample time to cast their votes and have a say in the rankings.

Table key
10	Winner of 10th award to be named All-Time Favourite Artiste at next ceremony

**十大最受欢迎男艺人; Top 10 Most Popular Male Artistes**
**Award Presenter: Chen Bolin & Zoe Tay**
Top 10 winners	No. of awards
Romeo Tan	9
Marcus Chin	4
Jeff Goh	2
Zhang Yaodong	6
Pornsak	10
Desmond Tan	8
Benjamin Tan	1
Shaun Chen	7
James Seah	1
Jeremy Chan	2
**十大最受欢迎女艺人; Top 10 Most Popular Female Artistes**
**Award Presenter: Chen Bolin**
Top 10 Winners	No. of awards
Chantalle Ng	3
Ya Hui	8
Carrie Wong	9
He Ying Ying	1
Chen Biyu	2
Tasha Low	2
Chen Ning	2
Yvonne Lim	10
Xixi Lim	1
Hong Ling	3

=== Most Popular Rising Star ===
This award, introduced alongside the traditional Top 10, targets junior artists with no more than five years of acting experience. It differs from the Top 10 as it is not specific to any gender, and only the three artistes with the highest number of votes would win the award. Additionally, victories in this category will contribute to an artist's overall tally for becoming an "All-Time Favourite Artiste." The voting period commenced on 18 March 2024 at 12pm. The unlimited voting began on 21 April 2024 at 12am and ended on 21 April 2024 at 5pm, offering participants ample time to cast their votes and have a say in the rankings.

**最受欢迎潜力星; Most Popular Rising Star Award**
**Award Presenter: SHINee member Onew**; Award winner audited by PwC Singapore
Top 3 winners	No. of awards
Ayden Sng	**2**
Zhang Zetong	**1**
Jernelle Oh	**1**

=== My Pick categories ===
最吸晴角色 The Show Stealer	最讨人厌大反派 Most Hated Villain
**Ayden Sng 孙政 / All That Glitters 金色大道 as He Jian Zhi 何建志**: Desmond Tan 陈泂江 / All That Glitters 金色大道 as Lin Mu Sen 林木森; Jeremy Chan 田铭耀 / All That Glitters 金色大道 as Huang Jin Tiao 黄金条; Jernelle Oh 胡煜诗 / Cash On Delivery 送餐英雄 as Huang Mei Zhen 黄美真; Richie Koh 许瑞奇 / Cash On Delivery 送餐英雄 as Lin Jun Cong 林俊聪	**Zhang Ze Tong 张哲通 / All That Glitters 金色大道 as Richard Mo**: Shaun Chen 陈泓宇 / My One and Only 只此一家 as Andy; Chen Hui Hui 陈慧慧 / My One and Only 只此一家 as May; Brandon Wong 黄炯耀 / SHERO as Yang Hua Biao 杨华标; Jeffrey Xu 徐鸣杰 / Strike Gold 黄金巨塔 as Ke Nan 柯男
最强CP Favourite CP
**Desmond Tan 陈泂江 & Chantalle Ng 黄暄婷 / All That Glitters 金色大道 as Lin Mu Sen 林木森 & Li Zhen Yu 李珍玉**: Jeremy Chan 田铭耀 & Pan Ling Ling 潘玲玲 / All That Glitters 金色大道 as Huang Jin Tiao 黄金条 & Pan Xiao Mei 潘小美; Richie Koh 许瑞奇 & He Ying Ying 何盈莹 / Cash On Delivery 送餐英雄 as Lin Jun Cong 林俊聪 & Qiu Si Ting 邱思婷; Richie Koh 许瑞奇 & Boon Hui Lu 文慧如 / Till The End 陪你到最后 as Peng You 彭友 & Lin Hui Qi 林卉琦; Rui En 瑞恩 & Kim Jae Hoon 金在勋 / Oppa Saranghae! 欧巴, 我爱你 ! as Ou Yang Qi Qi 欧阳琦琦 & Do Seo Joon 都小俊

Series that received multiple MY PICK! nominations
Nominations	Series
6	All That Glitters
3	Cash On Delivery
2	My One and Only

=== Sponsored awards ===
The Bioskin Most Charismatic Award's winners will be equally decided by professional judging and public voting, each contributing 50%. Voting started on March 25, 2024, at 12 pm and concluded on April 14, 2024, at 11:59 pm. Participation is open to anyone with a valid meconnect account, and casting votes online is completely free. The winner was revealed during the Star Awards 2024 – Walk Of Fame on April 21, 2024.

However, The Chan Brothers My Star Guide Award's final result will be exclusively based on public voting, which accounts for 100% of the decision. The voting period started on March 25, 2024, at 12 pm and concluded on April 14, 2024, at 11:59 pm. The winner was revealed during the Star Awards 2024 – Backstage Live on April 21, 2024.

Bioskin Most Charismatic Artiste Award
Bioskin 魅力四射奖

**Richie Koh 许瑞奇**

- Carrie Wong 黄思恬
- Fang Rong 芳榕
- He Ying Ying 何盈莹
- Tyler Ten 邓伟德
Chan Brothers My Star Guide Award
曾兄弟我的导游是红星奖

**Wallace Ang 洪圣安 - Japan**

- Bukoh Mary 巫许玛莉 - Uzbekistan
- Lim Leng Kee 林灵芝 - Brazil & Peru
- Lyu Linxuan 吕霖轩 - Xinjiang, China
- Phua Kia Peow 潘家镳 - Alaska

== Most nominated drama series/programme ==
Winning category obtained are marked with bold.

Nomination	Series / Programme	Categories
11	All That Glitters	Best Drama Serial / Best Director (2) / Best Actor (2) / Best Actress / Best Supporting Actor / Best Screenplay / Young Talent Award (3)
7	Cash On Delivery	Best Drama Serial / Best Actor / Best Actress / Best Supporting Actor / Best Supporting Actress / Best Screenplay / Young Talent Award
6
6	SHERO	Best Drama Serial / Best Director / Best Actress / Best Supporting Actor / Best Supporting Actress / Best Theme Song
6	Till the End	Best Drama Serial / Best Director / Best Actress / Best Supporting Actor / Best Screenplay / Best Theme Song
4	Oppa Saranghae!	Best Drama Serial / Best Actress / Best Theme Song / Best Screenplay
3	Silent Walls	Best Director / Best Actor / Best Screenplay
3	Stranger in the Dark	Best Rising Star (3)
2	Whatever Will Be, Will Be	Best Actor / Best Supporting Actor
Nomination	Series / Programme	Categories
5
5	Foodie Trio	Best Entertainment Programme / Best Programme Host / Young Talent Award / Best Producer (Entertainment) / Best Research Writer (Entertainment)
3	Hear U Out S4	Best Entertainment Programme / Best Programme Host / Best Producer (Entertainment)
3	Curious City S2	Best Research Writer (Entertainment) / Best Producer (Entertainment) / Best Rising Star
3	The Star Athele	Best Entertainment Programme / Best Producer (Enteterianment) / Best Research Writer (Entertainment)
3	The DAKA Show	Best Short-form Programme / Best Radio Programme / Best Audio Personality
2	Battle of Buskers	Best Entertainment Programme / Best Rising Star
2	Old Taste Detective S4	Best Infotainment Programme / Best Programme Host
2	Star Awards 2023	Best Producer (Entertainment) / Best Research Writer (Entertainment)
2	The Breakfast Quintet	Best Radio Programme / Best Audio Personality
2	The Shuang and Kunz Show	Best Radio Programme / Best Audio Personality
2	KUNZversations	Best Short-form Programme / Best Audio Personality

Artists who received 3 or more nominations
Nominations	Artist
6	Richie Koh
4	Jeremy Chan
4	Desmond Tan
3	Andie Chen
3	He Ying Ying
3	Boon Hui Lu
3	Kim Jae Hoon
3	Chantelle Ng
3	Jernelle Oh
3	Darren Lim
3	Zhang Zetong
3	Lim Leng Kee

== Judging panels ==
The distinguished winners are chosen through a thorough evaluation by a panel of judges during the final selection phase, in categories like Drama, Entertainment, Infotainment, performance, and creativity, plus popularity based on artist recognition. This rigorous process takes place within the eligibility period from 1 January 2023, to 31 December 2023.

Members	Position
Alice Kwan 管雪梅	Veteran Media Professional
Amy Wong 王心慰	Executive Producer
Angeline Poh	Mediacorp's Chief of Customer & Corporate Development
Chang Long Jong	CEO of mm2Asia
Chang Ting Fei 张庭翡	Producer, Adjunct Professor, Drama
Chua Chim Kang	Head & Chief Editor, Mediacorp
Dasmond Koh	DJ, Events, Artistes, Academy Subsidiaries
Dennis Yang	Founder of Studio 76 (Taiwan)
Derek Wong	Head of VIU Originals (Hong Kong)
Chan To-On Jacky 陈图安	Veteran Media Professional
Janine Stein	ContentAsia Editorial Director
Ken Wu	DJ, Radio Presenter, Taiwan
Lawrence Cheng	Actor, Director, Screenwriter, Host
Lee Ee Wurn	Programmes Director
Lee Hung Sheng	Audience Strategy Planner
Man Shu Sum 文树森	Veteran Media Professional
Mannson Yong	Broadcasters
Mark Huang	Senior Producer, Discovery APAC
May-Yi Lee	Factual & Animation Lead, WBD
Roland Lee	Radio, Producer, Writer (Astro)
Sabanitha Shanmugasundram	Content, Engagement Lead, Mediacorp
Simone Lum	Growth, Audio Lead, Mediacorp
Tang Chien Chiang	Veteran Media Producer, Taiwan
Teo Eng Tiong	Course Chair, Media
Virginia Lim	Chief Content Officer of VIU Asia

=== Eligibility and judging criteria ===
Initial nominations are determined by an industry-veteran panel based on qualified entries, followed by a professional judging phase that evaluates nominees across various criteria, including storytelling, content quality, and technical execution. Public voting is incorporated for selected categories, blending professional assessments with audience preferences to determine the final awardees.
