= Hao Hao =

Taiwanese singer-host (born 1980 or 1981)

- Born: Cheng Shih-wen; 13 November 1980 or 1981 (age 44–45); Taipei, Taiwan
- Other names: Aven Cheng; Cheng Shiwen
- Occupations: Singer; host; actor
- Years active: 2007−present
- Musical career
- Genres: Hokkien pop; Mandopop

Stage name
- Chinese: 皓皓
- Hanyu Pinyin: Hào Hào

Birth name
- Chinese: 程世文
- Hanyu Pinyin: Chéng Shìwén

Hao Hao (born Cheng Shih-wen on 13 November 1980 or 1981) is a Singapore-based Taiwanese getai singer-host and actor.

== Early life ==
Born in Taipei, Taiwan, and an only child, Cheng did various odd jobs in his primary school days, helping out with the household finances since young. His mother is a housewife who used to run a karaoke bar. His mother suffers from polio and has difficulty walking. His father was a retired soldier who suffered a stroke when Cheng was seven years old. His father was bedridden for 15 years and died of an illness in 2004.

== Career ==
Singing since he was 13, Cheng came to Singapore in 2007 on a two-year performance contract with NTUC Club, where he would put on live performances at resorts and clubhouses. In early 2008, Cheng was invited to perform at a getai show where his performance impressed the organiser. He was subsequently invited again to perform the next day. Soon after, getai bookings started to stream in for Cheng.

Through the years, Cheng established himself as a getai performer known for his stage presence, elaborate costumes, his ability to sing in both male and female voices and cross-dressing on stage. In 2013, a getai organiser commented that Cheng charges S$1,200 to S$1,500 to host a three-hour show during the Hungry Ghost Festival month, which is about S$300.00 to S$500.00 more than other performers due to his star appeal.

He is the current vice-chairman of the Singapore Artistes Association.

== Personal life ==
In late 2009, Cheng was summoned to a police station for breaching getai rules after dressing up as the late sultry star Marilyn Monroe and flashing a G-string underneath his skirt at a show. For not having a permit to cross-dress and also being indecently dressed, Cheng was later let off with a warning.

He currently resides alone in a five-room HDB flat in Singapore.

== Filmography ==
Cheng has appeared in the following programmes and films:

=== Television series ===
- I'm in Charge (2013)
- 118 (2015)
- Whatever Will Be, Will Be (2023)
- My One and Only (2023)

=== Variety and reality show ===
- GeTai Challenge (2015)
- Life Hacks (2016)
- Happy Sing-Along (2023; web series)

=== Film ===
- 12 Lotus (2008)

== Theatre ==
- Ge Tai - The Musical (2016)

== Awards and nominations ==
Year	Award	Category	Nominated work	Result	Ref
2013	Shin Min-Wanbao Getai Awards 2013	Most Popular Male Singer	—N/a	Won	
2013	Shin Min-Wanbao Getai Awards 2013	Best Costume	—N/a	Won	
2015	Shin Min-Wanbao Getai Awards 2015	Best Male Singer	—N/a	Won	
2015	GeTai Challenge	—N/a	—N/a	3rd Place	
2015	GeTai Challenge	Best Costume	—N/a	Won	
2015	GeTai Challenge	Most Popular Contestant	—N/a	Won	
2016	Shin Min-Wanbao Getai Awards 2016	Best Male Emcee	—N/a	Won	
2016	Shin Min-Wanbao Getai Awards 2016	Top 10 Most Popular Artistes	—N/a	Won	
2016	Shin Min-Wanbao Getai Awards 2016	Best Male Singer	—N/a	Won	
2017	Shin Min-Wanbao Getai Awards 2017	Most Popular Singer	—N/a	Won	
2017	Shin Min-Wanbao Getai Awards 2017	Best Male Emcee	—N/a	Won	
2017	Shin Min-Wanbao Getai Awards 2017	Best Male Singer	—N/a	Won	
