= Getai =

Form of live stage performance

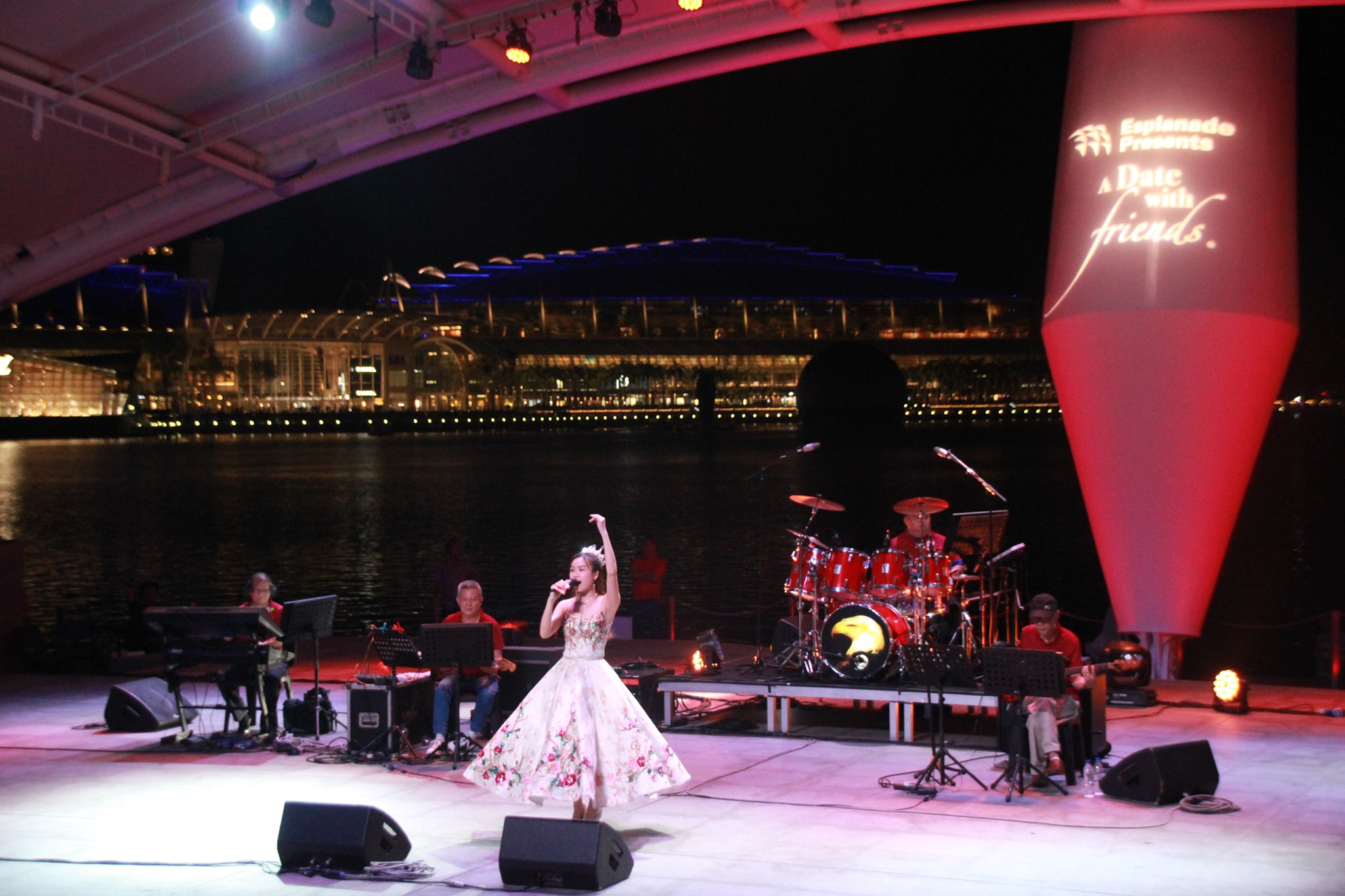
Getai at Esplanade C:2020

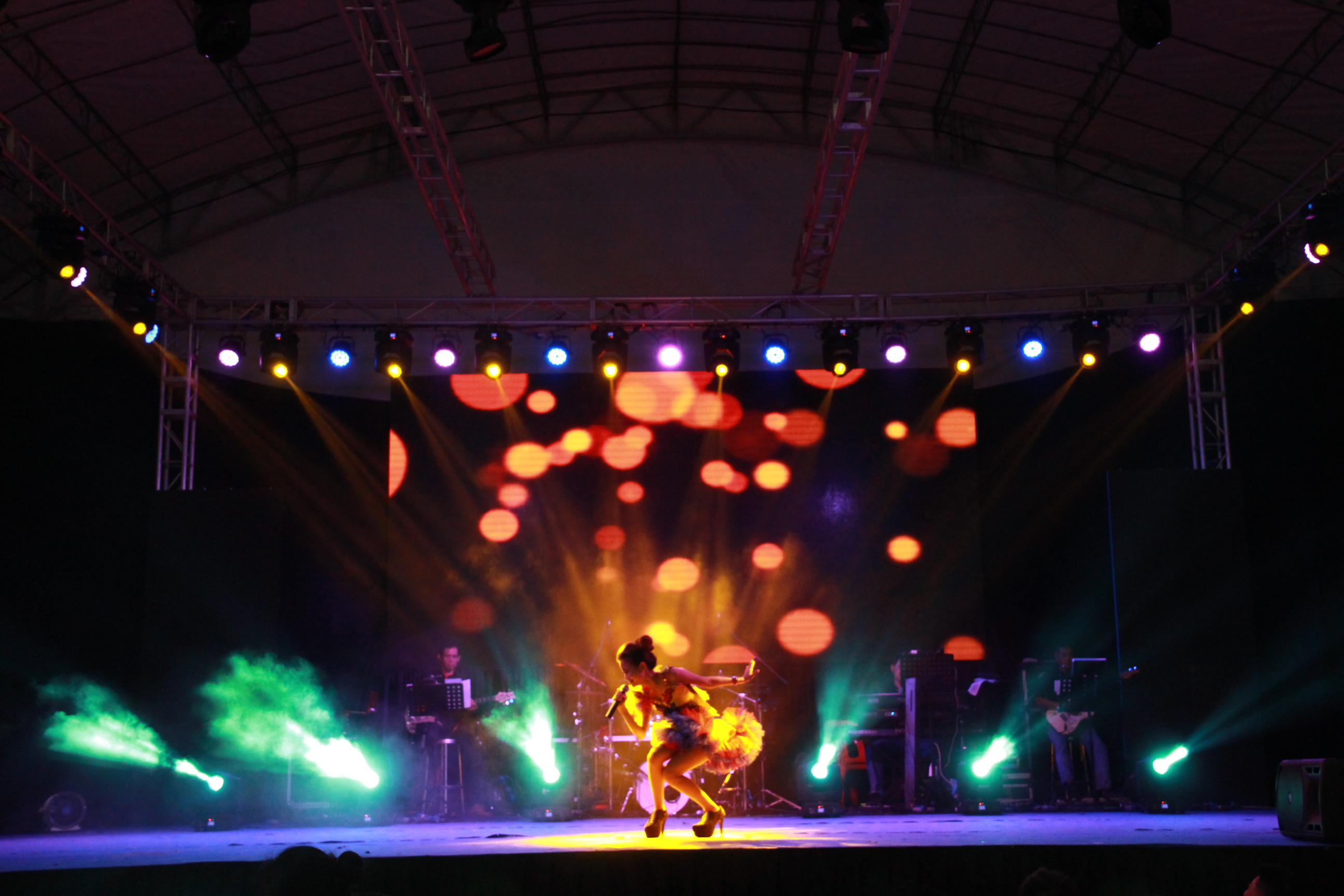
The Current Stage setup for major getai events C:2014

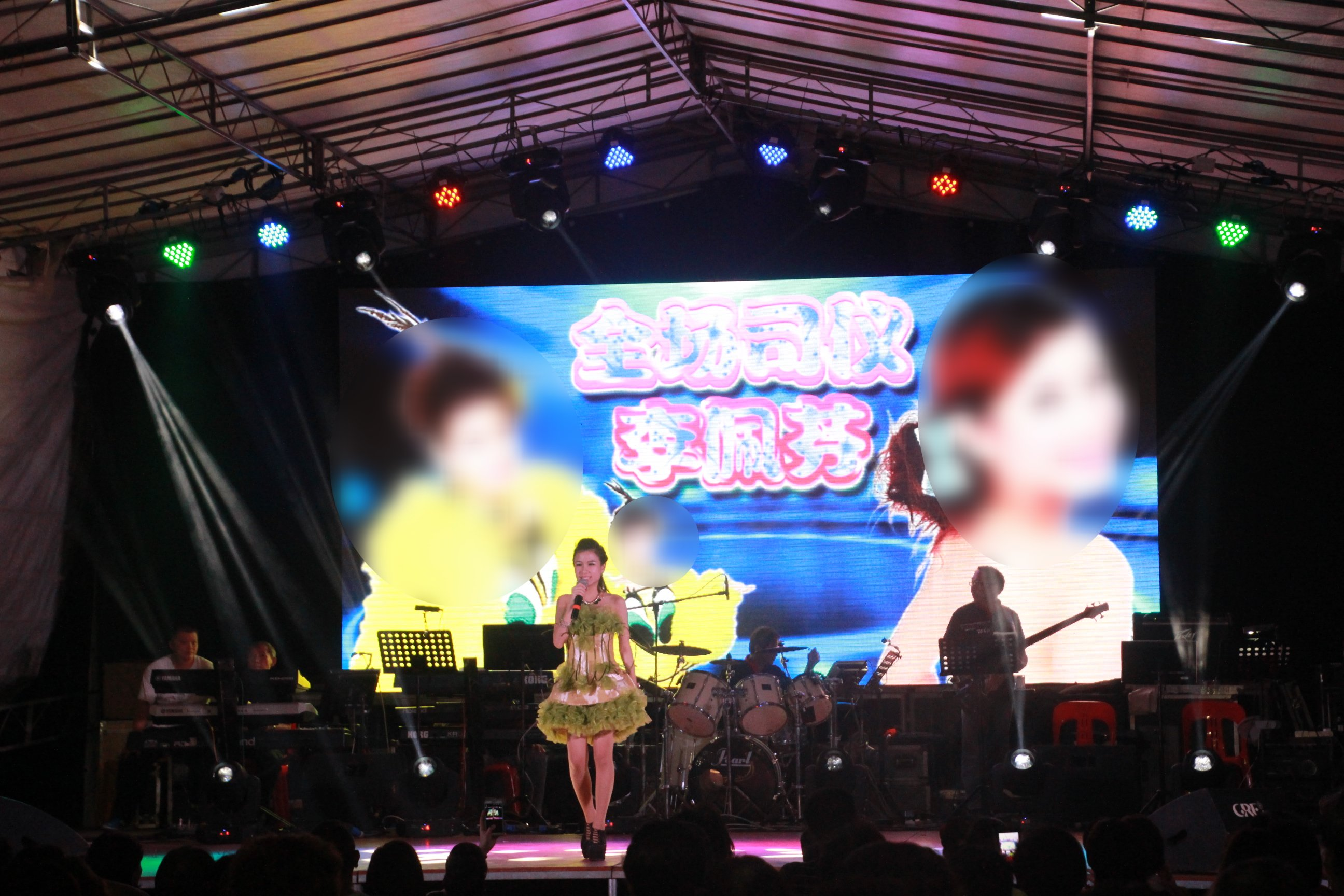
The Current Stage setup for major getai events C:2015

Getai (simplified Chinese: 歌台; traditional Chinese: 歌臺; pinyin: gē tái; lit. 'song stage') refers to boisterous live stage performances typically held during the Ghost Festival in the seventh lunar month and on the birthdays of Chinese deities. These shows typically last from 7.30pm to after 10pm and are commonly organised in Singapore, Malaysia and some parts of Indonesia (mainly in Riau, Riau Islands and North Sumatra). Additionally, stage setups are usually composed of temporary structures like tents situated in the suburbs of the city- namely, in empty fields, parking spaces or housing estates.

Stage backdrops are usually made of cardboard and cloths painted in bright colours, vibrantly illuminated by coloured spotlights. The performers normally don loud and glittery clothing. Some getai hosts indulge in crude humour; others maintain quick-witted dialogue, joking about local and current affairs, sometimes switching between Mandarin, non-Mandarin Chinese languages (like Hokkien, Teochew, or Cantonese), and even English and Indian languages. Younger people in Singapore may relate to Getai as kitsch, while older people enjoy dancing and singing along to familiar songs, often in Hokkien. Traditional singers such as Liu Lingling tend to dress conservatively, while young performers drawn to getai may choose more revealing outfits. The first row of seats at getai performances are also typically left empty and blocked off from the public as they are reserved for spirits and deities whom Chinese communities believe will return to the world of the living during the Hungry Ghost Festival. In Singapore's contemporary getai scene, performances feature local artistes such as the Baobei ("Darling" in Mandarin) Sisters and even international singers such as Hao Hao and Ya Ya from Taiwan, Bai Hui Mei from Hong Kong and Malaysia's "Little Princess", Li Bao En.

During the colonial period, Chinese operas and puppet shows were popular in Singapore. However, getai eventually began to overshadow these traditional forms of entertainment with its shorter and upbeat music performed by singers and live bands. Initially a popular form of entertainment found in amusement parks and theatres, getai eventually evolved into performances meant for wandering spirits during the Lunar Seventh Month's Hungry Ghost Festival and audiences in the world of the living.

Early getai acts during the mid-20th century have origins in Shanghainese culture and tradition- namely in its format, which incorporates a variety of acts into a single show. This style was characteristic of gewutuan (歌舞团), which translates to "song and dance troupe", a popular form of entertainment which first arrived on Singapore's shores in the 1930s but declined in the 1940s. Subsequently, performers previously in the gewutuan business moved over to getai and brought dancing, drama, magic tricks and acrobatic acts to getai shows. Hence, leading to getai program lineups with a variety of acts reminiscent of gewutuan performances.

== History ==
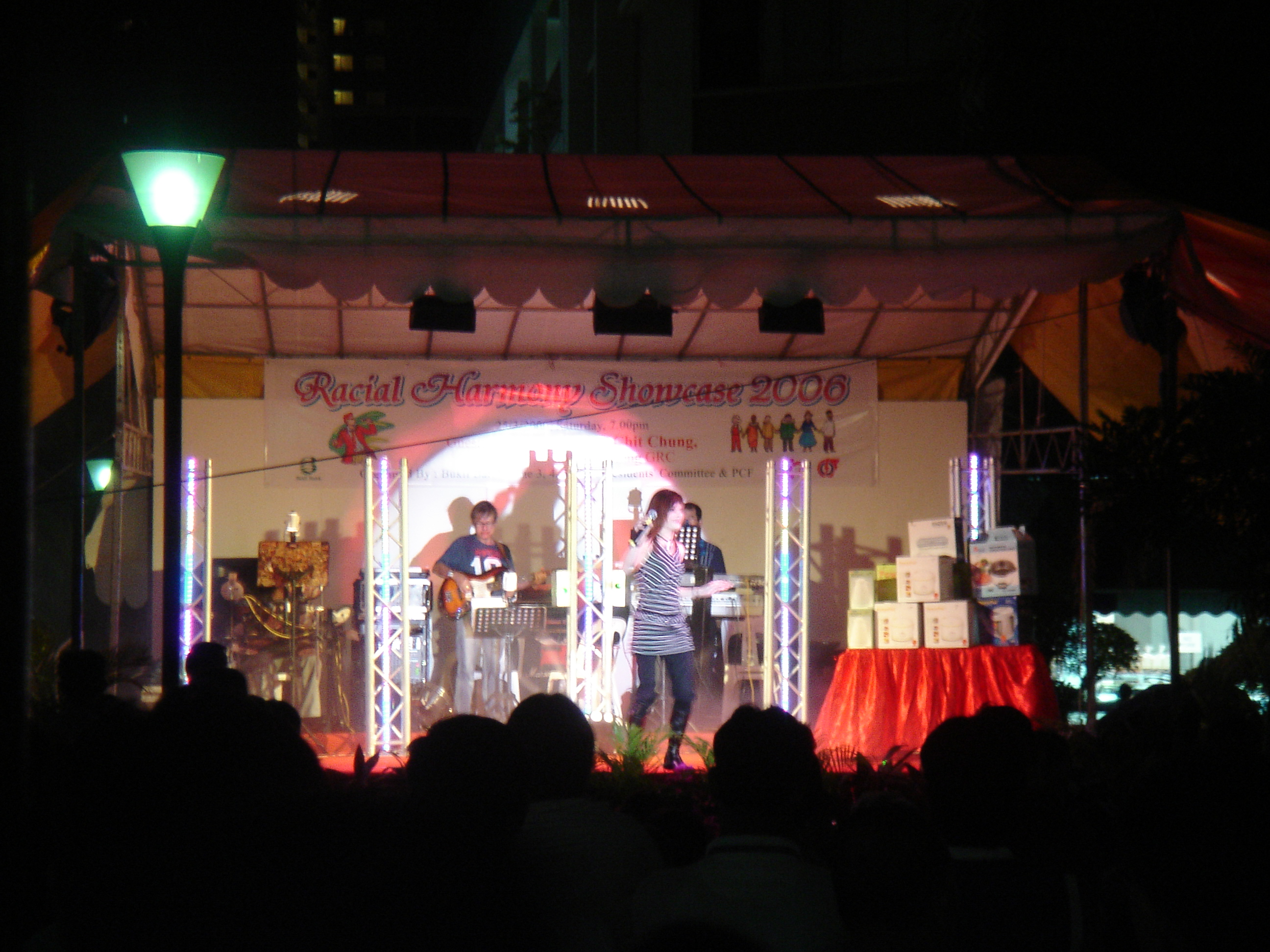
Getai in 2006

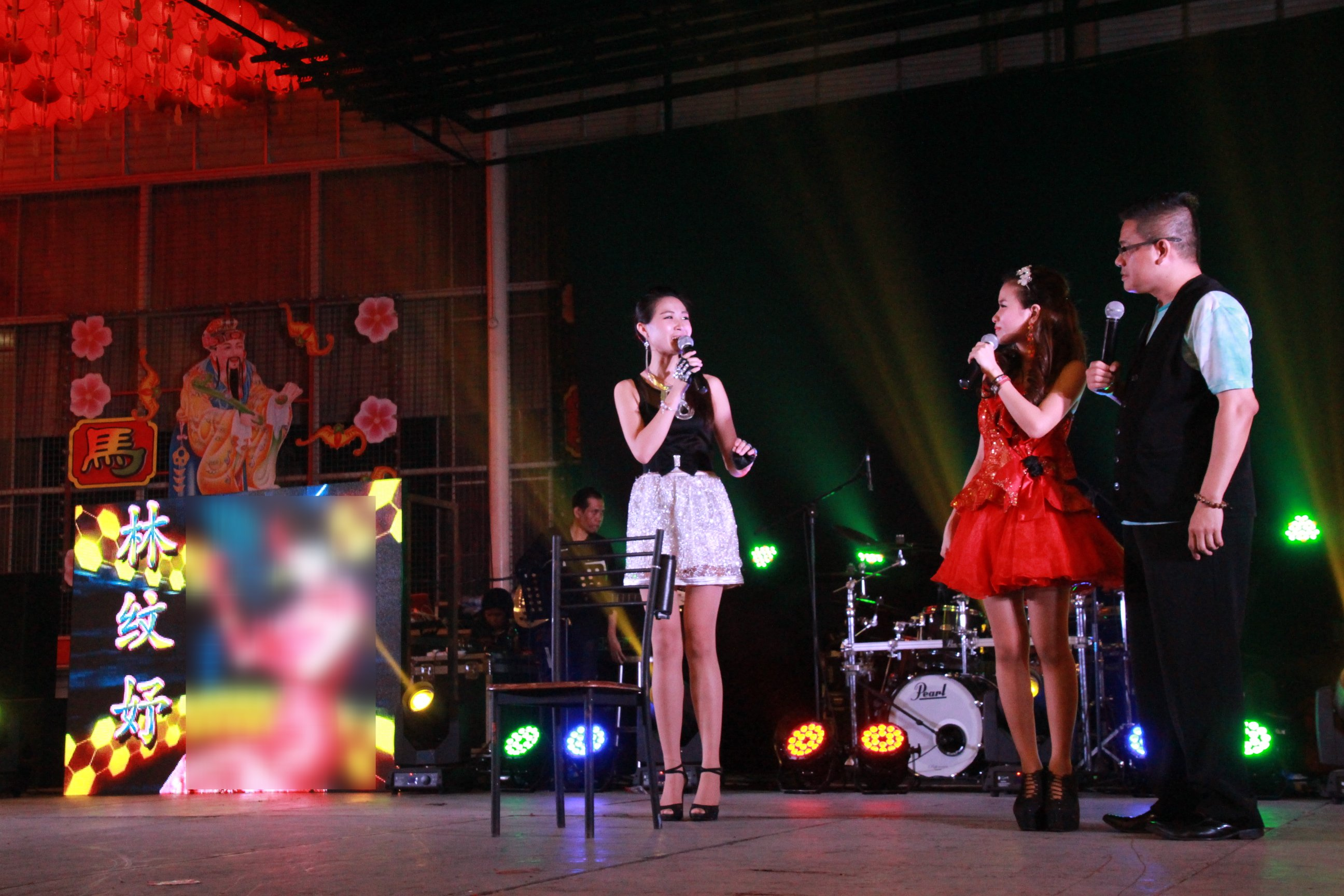
LED panels identify a singer to the audience

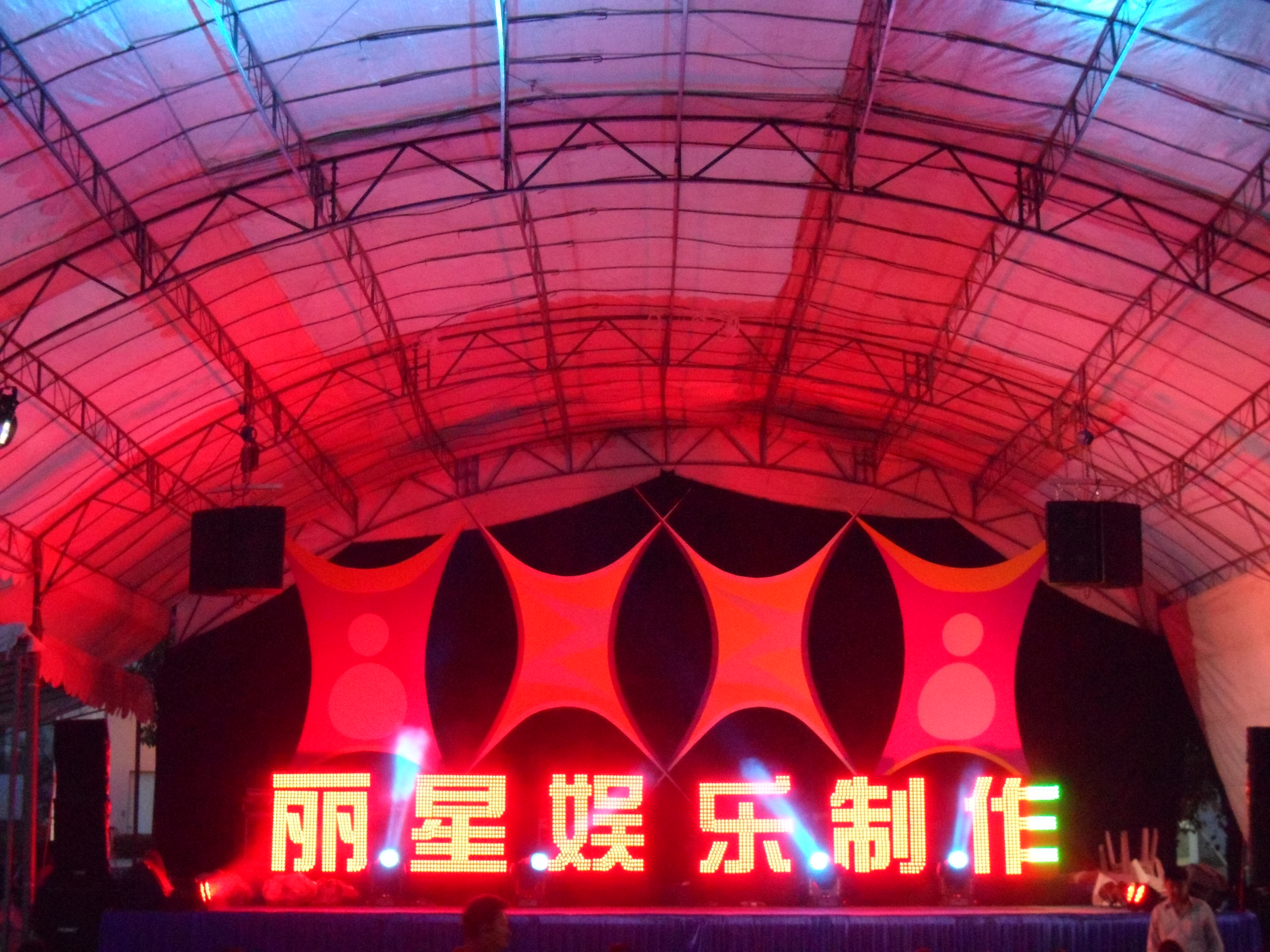
Getais are popular among residents in Singapore, as they are held only occasionally.

Getai emerged in Singapore in the years of Japanese occupation in the 1940s. The first getai performance, known as Dayehui (大夜会), was organised by a business owner at the New World Amusement Park in hopes of attracting more customers to his drinks store. In particular, patrons could enjoy live music and singing for three hours if they purchased a drink. This sale of refreshments contributed to the wages earned by getai troupes, which could also be the reason why the locale of such live shows were referred to as "evening cafes", "night cafes" or "singing cafes" by the English newspapers in Singapore during the 1950s. During its early days, getai performances were permanently held in the Worlds Amusement Parks: Great World, Happy World and New World. One of such getai stages was the Weiyang Gong ("Palace of Day and Night") in the New World Amusement Park. However, it was bombed by the Japanese and a new stage Gongkai Tai ("Public Stage") was built. Nonetheless, getai performances also attracted a Japanese audience, namely, senior officers from the Japanese army who brought music scores of songs they wanted to hear to getai artists and musicians to perform.

Performance areas were usually marked out by a short fence and would vary from show to show, and from venue to venue. Sometimes they took place under shelters and at other times, both audience and performers were subject to the elements of the weather. Additionally, acts would be performed on a proscenium stage, complete with a cloth backdrop designed according to the theme of the show. Shows typically began at 8 pm and ended at 11 pm daily at areas delineated by a short fence. Tables covered with white tablecloths which were set up in the vicinity of the performance could seat up to 4 people and some would be reserved for regulars. Unreserved seats were first-come-first serve and those who arrived after all tables were occupied had to stand during the performance. Seated patrons would then be served refreshments which could cost from 80 cents to a dollar. These included bottled soft drinks such as Greenspot, which was an orange drink.

Getai shows usually began with an opening song, some examples being marches like Qiancheng Wanli ("A Bright Future") and Boaige ("Song of Universal Love"), by all of the performers who would line up on stage. The opening act would be followed by magic tricks, acrobatics, songs and dancing- which could be solos or duets. During the 1950s, traditional folk songs and popular Mandarin songs from Mainland China were commonly sung, danced to, and enjoyed by the local crowd during getai performances. However, dancing and singing simultaneously during a live performance was not commonplace for getai singers at this point and artistes typically sang while reading lyrics off a music stand. At the mid-point of the lineup, performers would then put on comedy skits before more supporting acts followed. Sometimes, getai acts drew from Western influences and adapted stories such as Samson and Delilah from the Bible, and a getai performer named Bai Yan even wrote and acted out a satirical skit about Adolf Hitler, which he titled The Great Dictator. After these segments came the highlight of the show, a spoken or dance drama before a final act which incorporated striptease. These performances were usually frequented by Chinese youth as well as journalists, students, housewives teachers and writers.

Besides permanent acts in amusement parks, there were also travelling getai troupes known by various names such as yanwutuan (艳舞团 translated to "exotic dance troupe"), gewujutuan (歌舞剧团 translated to "dance drama troupe") and gejutuan (歌剧团 translated to "song-and-drama troupe"). These performing groups travelled around and performed in various venues, including permanent getai stages such as those at the three World Amusement Parks.

=== The golden age of getai ===
After World War II, the subsequent Korean War led to a flourishing economy in Malaya. This was due to an increase in demand for rubber and tin, the two main commodities traded in the Malayan economy, by parties involved in the subsequent Korean War who were in need of military materials. The bourgeoning economy then led to an increased desire for leisure on the local scene which fuelled the demand for entertainment such as getai performances. Furthermore, the dissemination of Chinese mosquito newspapers, the main paper that contained information and articles about getai, also aided in increasing show publicity. Getai became increasing popular, and by the 1950s, there were many getai stages established at the three "Worlds" Amusement Parks such as the Bailemen ("Paramount"), Xianggelila ("Shangri-La"), Yehuayuan ("Night Garden"), Menjianghong ("Red Filling the River"), Xianle ("Heavenly Joy") and Fenghuang ("Phoenix"). During this period, performers earned wages that could go up to SGD$1,200.

In the 1950s, prominent business owners operating in the getai industry included the Shaw Brothers who owned amusement parks and cinemas which gave them the power to invite performers to various locations under their name. The Cathay also rose as a competitor and invited many getai troupes to perform in their cinemas but were unable to overtake the Shaw Brothers.

From the mid-1940s to the early 1960s, at least 50 getai shows were hosted in Singapore. However, getai in amusement parks declined in popularity in the late 1950s and stages began close down in the 1960s. It had however become established by the 1970s as popular entertainment on makeshift stages set-up along streets and in other public spaces during the Hungry Ghost Festival.

=== Policing striptease in the 1950s ===
In the 1950s, getai performances began to incorporate more risqué elements and striptease due to the popularisation of erotic entertainment in Singaporean society. This trend began as early as the 1930s and 1940s when Western trends and images of the sexualised female body began to permeate Singaporean society in public media. Performers and show-runners in the getai business then began to capitalise on the growing market for such forms of entertainment and came up with programs which appealed to the public in a sexually provocative manner. Additionally, the erotic genre appealed even more to individuals and artistes in the getai industry as it brought in more revenue compared to regular programs. In particular, strippers could earn up to SGD$1,500 a month which even surpassed the salary of cream-of-the-crop getai artists at that time. Getai performances began to incorporate sexual elements such as songs which contained alluring or flirtatious lyrics known as "tofu songs [豆腐歌曲]". However, other shows such as Fong Fong cafe's "Model" program performed in 1951 and 1953 included striptease as well as interactive segments where artistes would kiss audience members. Fong Fong cafe's "Model" was later replicated by other getai stages as well which featured female performers dressed in sheer, nude-coloured underwear made to appear fully unclothed with stage lighting. These getai shows also began to attract multi-ethnic audiences beyond the Chinese community which led to a variety of languages being used during shows such as non-Mandarin Chinese languages, Malay, English and Mandarin.

As the trend persisted into the mid-1950s, the term roudan (肉弹), or "bombshell" was increasingly used in Chinese communities to refer to strippers who performed erotic acts at shows which mirrored the ways in which Western strippers were represented as "bombs". Additionally, Mosquito newspapers which advertised getai acts began to use the term "bomb" (弹) when advertising getai performances incorporating striptease. However, this term also had derogatory undertones to it which painted female strippers performing in Singapore in a negative light.

These performances also attracted criticism from Chinese newspapers such as Nanfang Wanbao and XinLi Bao whose writers condemned striptease for threatening public morality. The colonial police began to exert control over such erotic entertainment under the 1895 Theatres Ordinance which allowed the authorities to revoke show-runners' location permits if performances were perceived as obscene and only return them when the striptease acts were removed from the program. However, at this time, what was considered obscene and what was not had not yet been defined in local legislations in Singapore and Malaya, which allowed getai program planners and artistes to reinterpret and restructure erotic forms of entertainment to avoid getting caught. This manifested in the form of a new program by Fong Fong cafe, titled "Night Butterfly (夜蝴蝶)" where artistes wore gauze butterfly wings and sheer, nude-coloured undergarments with gold stars placed on certain parts of the body which was also replicated by other getai programs.

Pressured by religious organisations such as the Malayan Christian Council, Singapore Buddhist Federation and Chinese Young Men Christians’ Association (YMCA), the colonial police clamped down harder on striptease acts by suspending entertainment licences, increasing the frequency of checks on program content and imposing rules which prohibited getai performers from performing risqué programs amongst other criteria. Performers and show-runners who were affected by these laws then either chose to move into the travelling entertainment business by forming yanwutuan or limited sexual content from programs in order to continue performing in Singapore. In 1959, the Singaporean government launched an anti-yellow movement which aimed to eradicate all forms of immoral or decadent behaviour, including erotic forms of entertainment like striptease present in getai shows. Such risqué elements were banned as they were perceived as a threat to the nation building project.

== Getai in the 21st century ==
A groundbreaking getai performance was organised by getai veteran Peter Low in 2006. The act showcased a twelve-hour program featuring many famous performers gracing the stage and bringing the crowd to their feet. In keeping up with trends and technology, stage design has shown major changes throughout the years, including upgrading sound systems and adding LED Panels. On 31 July 2011, getai performances were also held at Orchard Road Ngee Ann City Civic Plaza for the first time with these new sound and light systems. As it was the first getai show to be held in the shopping strip in front of a wider audience, including tourists, instead of the usual open fields in neighbourhood areas, the show did not feature any crude humour and scantily clad dancers or singers.

Getai has also been organised for other Chinese festivals, such as the Mid-Autumn Festival. Resorts World Sentosa's casino included getai in its 2010 Chinese New Year celebrations. Additionally, Loyang Tua Pek Kong Temple arranged getai performances for their 2010 Mid-Autumn celebrations.

Nonetheless, in the 21st century, the getai industry continues to be subject to restrictions imposed by Singapore's authorities such as being censored for sexually provocative content like revealing costumes, risqué dances and drag performances. Additionally, as more residences are being built in housing estates for Singapore's population, the number of performance sites such as open fields in these areas have dwindled over the years, making it challenging for getai show-runners to secure locations for events.

=== GeTai Challenge ===
In 2015 & 2018, Singapore Mediacorp Channel 8 held a competition for getai singers named GeTai Challenge (歌台星力量). The show run for two seasons with the most recent season premiered on 20 April 2018 and ended on 10 August 2018.

=== Getai in Singapore's media ===
Getai has been increasingly accepted and celebrated by the mainstream media. Royston Tan's 2007 movie 881 is based on a pair of getai singers. The Straits Times's social networking and citizen journalism portal STOMP holds the Getai Awards annually to honour popular getai artists. These artists are selected via voting by the general public.

=== Getai in a digital age ===
First streamed on the RINGS.TV mobile phone application available on android and Apple iOS, getai performances were increasingly broadcast on Facebook Live as early as 2013. This practice became more established in 2016. Such forms of content are typically uploaded by Chinese temples, entertainment organisations such as LEX(S) Entertainment (Lixing Entertainment 麗聲娛樂製作), photojournalists, videographers, getai fans and members of the Taoist community such as Victor Yue. Yue is well known amongst individuals who consume online content on Taoism and Chinese Temples in Singapore and he is the founder of the Facebook group, "Taoism Singapore", where various photographs, videos and live streams of getai performances are shared both by himself and other individuals in the group. Other groups where getai content is shared and circulated include "Singapore Getai Supporter", "Singapore Getai Fans Page", "Lixin Fan Page" and "LEX-S Watch Live Channel"- a majority of which were created and managed by LEX(S) Entertainment Productions.

The digitisation of getai performances has broadened the reach of these live shows. Previously, performances were only available to audience members physically at the event but with the advent of live streaming, viewers are still able to witness religious events such as the possession of spirit mediums by deities, songs and other entertainment acts even if they are unable to be present for the show. Additionally, this can be done at any point in time after the live show as well as performances which were broadcast would be archived and saved on Facebook, enabling online audiences to re-watch or catch up on getai shows they may have missed even after it has ended. In 2020, getai performances were held digitally via YouTube and Facebook to entertain the elderly. This transition to an online format also ensured jobs for crew and performers as getai shows were not available during the coronavirus outbreak in Singapore.
