= Bai wan da ying jia =

Singaporean television quiz show

- Logo
- Also known as: Who Wants To Be A Millionaire?
- Chinese: 百万大赢家
- Presented by: Chao Chi-Tai (曹启泰)
- Country of origin: Singapore
- Original language: Mandarin

Original release
- Network: MediaCorp TV Channel 8
- Release: August 16, 2000 – 2004

Bai Wan Da Ying Jia (Chinese: 百万大赢家, English translation: Million-dollar winner) is a Singaporean game show based on the original British format of Who Wants to Be a Millionaire?. The show was hosted by Chao Chi-Tai. The main goal of the game was to win 1 million Singapore dollars by answering 15 multiple-choice questions correctly. There were three lifelines - fifty fifty, phone a friend and ask the audience.

Bai Wan Da Ying Jia was shown on the Singaporean TV station MediaCorp TV Channel 8. Over its three seasons, the show had an average of 570,000 watchers.

The show was also nominated for Star Awards in the years 2001 and 2002, in 2001 the show won in the category of Best Variety Program. However, in the year 2002, the show lost to another rival program.

Contestants' poor performance in answering general knowledge led viewers to bemoan how they were bringing shame on the country in calling into question Singapore's strong educational system.

Hong Menyan of Lianhe Zaobao penned a mixed review of the show. He said that what stood out unexpectedly was how funny Singaporeans were on the show, contrary to their usual serious image, which "enhanced the show's entertainment effect". Hong found that the show moved at a slower pace compared to its Hong Kong and Taiwan counterparts.

== Payout structure ==
Payout structure
Question number	Question value
Question number	(Yellow zones are the guaranteed levels)
1	$100
2	$200
3	$300
4	$500
5	$1,000
6	$2,000
7	$4,000
8	$8,000
9	$16,000
10	$32,000
11	$64,000
12	$125,000
13	$250,000
14	$500,000
15	$1,000,000
