= Star Awards for Best Variety Producer =

Singaporean television award

Star Awards for Best Variety Producer 最佳综艺编导
- Current: Star Awards 2024
- Description: Best Variety Producer in Mediacorp
- Country: Singapore
- Presented by: Mediacorp
- First award: 2001
- Currently held by: Goh Si Jiau / Star Awards 2023 - Awards Ceremony

The Best Variety Producer is an award presented annually at the Star Awards, an annual ceremony held in Singapore where the media organisation Mediacorp recognises entertainers under their employment for outstanding performances of the year.

== History ==
The Best Variety Producer is an award that was established in 2001.

== Recipients ==
Table key
indicates the winner

=== 2000s ===
Year	Best Variety Research Writer	Representative Variety Show	Ref
2001	Johnni Law	Star Search Grand Finals 2001	

=== 2010s ===
Year	Best Variety Research Writer	Representative Variety Show	Ref
2011	Kang Lay See 江丽丝	Love on A Plate 名厨出走记	
2011	Gan Bee Khim 颜美琴	Dream Potter 梦.窑匠	
2011	Glen Lim 林祥平	Star Awards 2010 (Show 2) 红星大奖2010	
2011	Jean Toh 卓金云	Star Search 10 - Grand Finals 才华横溢出新秀 总决赛	
2011	Tan Boon Chong 陈文聪	Food Source 食在好源头	
2013	Kerlin Teo	Share Something	
2014	Gan Bee Khim 颜美琴	The Joy Truck	
2015	Kang Lay See 江丽丝	Finding 8	
2016	Kang Lay See 江丽丝	Love on A Plate 3 名厨出走记 3	
2016	Gan Bee Khim 颜美琴	Ge Tai Challenge 歌台星力量	
2016	Khow Hwai Teng	SPD Charity Show 2015 真情无障爱	
2016	Jean Toh 卓金云	Star Awards 2015 (Show 2) 红星大奖2015 加利谷颁奖典礼	
2016	Alfred Yeo	The Successor 锁住味道	
2017	Jean Toh	As I Hold Your Hand	

=== 2020s ===
Year	Best Variety Research Writer	Representative Variety Show	Ref
2022	Kang Lay See 江丽丝	Curious City 小岛国 大发现	
2023	Kang Lay See 江丽丝	Dishing with Chris Lee 阿顺有煮意	
2024	Goh Si Jiau 吴仕佼	Star Awards 2023 - Awards Ceremony 红星大奖2023 - 颁奖典礼	

== Multiple wins and nominations ==
The following individuals have received two or more Best Variety Producer nominations (* indicates no wins):

Nominations	Producer
5	Kang Lay See 江丽丝
3	Gan Bee Khim 颜美琴
2	Jean Toh 卓金云

The following individuals have won multiple Best Variety Producer awards:

Wins	Producer
5	Kang Lay See 江丽丝
