= Luo Shih-feng =

Taiwanese singer and television host

- 羅時豐
- Born: 22 July 1968 (age 57); Sanyi, Miaoli, Taiwan
- Occupations: Singer, songwriter, host
- Years active: 1984–present
- Awards: Golden Melody Awards – Best Non-Mandarin Male Singer; 2001 Golden Bell Awards – Best Variety Show Host; 1997
- Musical career
- Origin: Taiwan
- Genres: Hokkien pop, Mandopop
- Instrument: vocals

Chinese name
- Traditional Chinese: 羅時豐
Transcriptions
Standard Mandarin
- Hanyu Pinyin: Luó Shífēng
Hakka
- Pha̍k-fa-sṳ: Lô Shî-fung
Southern Min
- Hokkien POJ: Lô Sî-hong

Luo Shih-feng (Chinese: 羅時豐; pinyin: Luó Shífēng; Pe̍h-ōe-jī: Lô Sî-hong; born 22 July 1968), known also by his English name Daniel Lo, is a Taiwanese singer, songwriter and television host.

He was born in Miaoli County and is of Hakka descent. Luo performs Hokkien pop and Mandopop, and received a Golden Bell Award in 1997, followed by a Golden Melody Award in 2001.
