= Pornsak =

Pornsak (Thai: พรศักดิ์, romanized: Phonsak) is a given name of Thai origin. People with that name include:

- Pornsak Pongthong, a professional footballer in Thailand
- Pornsak Prajakwit, a Thailand-born media personality in Singapore
- Pornsak Songsaeng, a male Mor lam singer in Thailand
