= Kate Miller-Heidke discography =

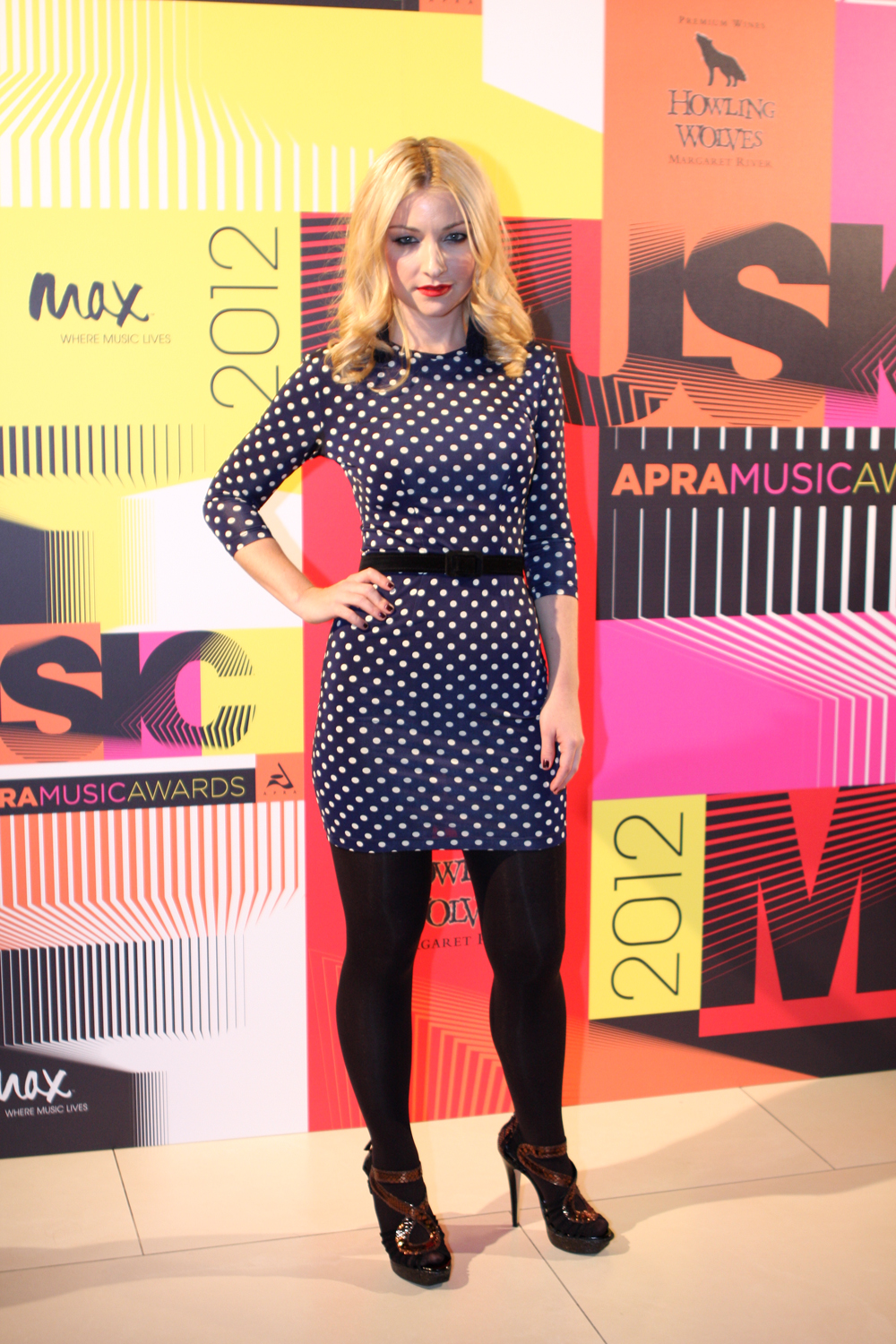
- Miller-Heidke in 2012
- Studio albums: 6
- Extended plays: 4
- Live albums: 3
- Compilation albums: 1
- Singles: 27
- Video albums: 1
- Tours: 5

The discography of Kate Miller-Heidke, an Australian singer-songwriter, consists of six studio albums, four extended plays, and twenty-seven singles.

Miller-Heidke released her first music in 2002 and in 2006, Miller-Heidke was signed to Sony Music Australia. Her 2007 debut studio album Little Eve was a commercial and critical success, gaining gold sales and receiving four nominations at the 2007 ARIA Awards including "Best Female Artist". In 2008, she released her second album Curiouser which became her first top 10 release. The album spawned three top 40 singles, including "Caught in the Crowd", for which she and co-writer Keir Nuttall won the 2008 International Songwriting Competition and "The Last Day on Earth", which became her first ever top 10 single. She released her third studio album, Nightflight, in April 2012. Miller-left Sony Records, and released her fourth solo studio album, O Vertigo! in 2014, independently.

== Albums ==
=== Studio albums ===
List of albums, with selected chart positions and certifications
Title	Album details	Peak chart positions	Certifications
Title	Album details	AUS	Certifications
Little Eve	Released: 26 May 2007; Label: Sony (88697115762); Formats: CD, digital download	11	ARIA: Gold
Curiouser	Released: 18 October 2008; Label: Sony (88697394402); Formats: CD, digital download	2	ARIA: Platinum
Nightflight	Released: 13 April 2012; Label: Sony (88691974412); Formats: CD, LP, digital download	2	
O Vertigo!	Released: 14 March 2014; Label: Cooking Vinyl (CVCD010); Formats: CD, LP, digital download	4	
Child in Reverse	Released: 30 October 2020; Label: EMI (3502615); Formats: CD, LP, digital download	9	
The Kiss and the Abyss	Released: 14 August 2026; Label: EMI; Formats: CD, LP, digital download	11	

=== Live albums ===
List of live albums, with selected chart positions
Title	Album details	Peak chart positions
Title	Album details	AUS
Live at the Hi-Fi	Released: 9 October 2009; Label: Sony (0886975914326); Formats: CD, digital download	71
Heavenly Sounds Live	Released: 27 September 2013; Label: Independent; Format: digital download	— (Note: Heavenly Sounds Live was a free download to people who funded the making of O Vertigo!)
Live at the Sydney Opera House (with the Sydney Symphony Orchestra)	Released: 11 August 2017; Label: ABC Music, UMA (5768885); Formats: CD, digital download	31

=== Compilation albums ===
List of compilation albums, with selected chart positions
Title	Album details	Peak chart positions
Title	Album details	AUS
The Best of Kate Miller-Heidke: Act One	Released: 2 December 2016; Label: Sony Music Australia; Formats: CD, digital download	35

=== Collaboration albums ===
List of albums, with selected chart positions
Title	Album details	Peak chart positions
Title	Album details	AUS
Elsewhere (with Elsewhere)	Released: January 2002; Label: FunkFolk; Format: CD	—
Fatty Gets a Stylist (with Fatty Gets a Stylist) (Note: Internationally released under Miller-Heidke's own name.)	Released: 1 July 2011; Label: Sony; Formats: CD, digital download	90
Time Falling (with Michel van der Aa)	Released: 27 February 2020; Label: Independent; Formats: Digital download	—

=== Cast albums and soundtracks ===
List of albums, with selected chart positions
Title	Album details
The Divorce (Original Soundtrack)	Released: March 2016; Label: Universal; Formats: CD, digital download
The Rabbits (Live Original Cast Recording)	Released: April 2016; Label: ABC Classics/UMA (481 2535); Formats: CD, digital download

== Extended plays ==
List of EPs, with selected details
Title	EP details
Telegram	Released: 19 July 2004; Label: Independent (KMH1001); Formats: CD, digital download
Comikaze	Released: 2005; Label: Independent; Format: CD
Circular Breathing	Released: 1 May 2006; Label: Sony (82876828902); Formats: CD, digital download
Live at the Playroom	Released: 28 August 2007; Label: Sony; Format: digital download

== Singles ==
List of singles, with selected chart positions and certifications
Title	Year	Peak chart positions			Certifications	Album
Title	Year	AUS	SWE Heat.	UK Down.	Certifications	Album
"Apartment"	2006	—	—	—		Circular Breathing
"Words"	2007	43	—	—		Little Eve
"Make It Last"	2007	—	—	—		Little Eve
"Space They Cannot Touch"	2008	—	—	—		Little Eve
"Can't Shake It"	2008	38	—	—		Curiouser
"Caught in the Crowd"	2009	33	—	—	ARIA: Gold	Curiouser
"The Last Day on Earth"	2009	3	—	—	ARIA: 3× Platinum	Curiouser
"I'll Change Your Mind"	2012	—	—	—		Nightflight
"Sarah"	2013	—	—	—		Nightflight
"Ride This Feeling"	2013	—	—	—		Nightflight
"Drama" (featuring Drapht)	2014	—	—	—		O Vertigo!
"Sing to Me"	2014	—	—	—		O Vertigo!
"Offer It Up"	2014	—	—	—		O Vertigo!
"I'm Growing a Beard Downstairs for Christmas" (featuring The Beards)	2015	—	—	—		The Best of Kate Miller-Heidke: Act One
"Where?"	2016	—	—	—		The Rabbits
"You've Underestimated Me, Dude"	2016	—	—	—		The Best of Kate Miller-Heidke: Act One
"Zero Gravity"	2019	95	2	57		Non-album singles
"Ernie"	2019	—	—	—		Non-album singles
"The Aleph" (with Michel van der Aa)	2020	—	—	—		The Falling
"I Think of Fire" (with Michel van der Aa)	2020	—	—	—		The Falling
"This Is Not Forever"	2020	—	—	—		Child in Reverse
"Deluded"	2020	—	—	—		Child in Reverse
"A Quiet Voice"	2020	—	—	—		Child in Reverse
"Little Roots, Little Shoots"	2020	—	—	—		Child in Reverse
"I Am My Own Panther Now"	2021	—	—	—		Preppers (soundtrack)
"The Healing Tree" (with Tasmanian Symphony Orchestra)	2021	—	—	—		Nightlight
"You Can't Hurt Me Anymore" (featuring Jaguar Jonze)	2022	—	—	—		Child in Reverse (Deluxe)
"The Last Day On Earth" (featuring Marcus Bridge)	2023	—	—	—		Non-album single
"Linger"	2024	—	—	—		Non-album single
"Holiday"	2026	—	—	—		The Kiss and The Abyss
"A Certain Panic"	2026	—	—	—		The Kiss and The Abyss
"Butterflies"	2026	—	—	—		The Kiss and The Abyss
"–" denotes releases that did not chart.

=== Collaboration singles ===
List of singles, with selected details
Title	Year	Album
"Holloway Park"	2010	Fatty Gets a Stylist
"Are You Ready?"^{[a]}	2011	Fatty Gets a Stylist

=== Promotional singles ===
List of singles, with selected details
Title	Year	Album
"Out & In"	2006	Circular Breathing
"Psycho Killer"	2006	Little Eve
"O Vertigo!"	2014	O Vertigo!
"Share Your Air" (with Passenger)	2014	O Vertigo!
"Yours Was the Body"	2014	O Vertigo!

== Videos ==
List of videos, with selected details
Title	Details
Live in San Francisco	Released: 10 October 2010; Format: DVD; Label: Sony

== Music videos ==
Year	Title	Director
2007	"Words"	Stephen Lance & Mairi Cameron
2007	"Make It Last"	Stephen Lance & Mairi Cameron
2008	"Can't Shake It"	Dan Reisinger
2008	"Caught in the Crowd"	Stephen Lance, Mairi Cameron & Steve Baker
2009	"The Last Day on Earth"	Mark Alston
2012	"I'll Change Your Mind"	Darcy Prendergast
2013	"Ride This Feeling"	Lucy Dyson
2014	"Share Your Air" (with Passenger)	Darcy Prendergast & Andrew Goldsmith
2016	"You've Underestimated Me, Dude"	Amy Gebhardt
2019	"Ernie"	
2020	"The Aleph"	Michel van der Aa
2020	"This is Not Forever"	
2020	"Deluded"	Jeff Andersen Jr & Nick McKk.
2022	"You Can't Hurt Me Anymore" (featuring Jaguar Jonze)	Joshua Tate

=== Lyric videos ===
Year	Title	Director
2012	"Sarah"	—N/a
2012	"Nightflight"	—N/a
2012	"The Devil Wears a Suit"	—N/a
2012	"In the Dark"	—N/a
2014	"O Vertigo!"	Darcy Prendergast & Andrew Goldsmith
2014	"Drama" (with Drapht)	—N/a
2014	"Offer It Up"	—N/a
2014	"Yours Was the Body"	—N/a
2015	"I'm Growing a Beard Downstairs for Christmas" (with The Beards)	—N/a
2019	"Zero Gravity"	—N/a
2020	"Blood Red Rose"	Siân Darling
2020	"A Quiet Voice"	Chloe Young
2020	"Little Roots, Little Shoots"	
2020	"Simpatico" (with Mallrat)	

== Guest appearances ==
Year	Song	Album
2004	"Hot and Cold" (with Yanto Browning)	Escape (QUT Compilation Album)
2005	"The Mill Song (Teschnik Remix)" (with Yanto Browning)	Coastal Chill 6
2006	"River" (Note: "River" was also included on the second disc of the limited edition version of Little Eve)	Home: Songs of Hope & Journey
2006	"Little Water Song"	Like a Version
2007	"Careless Whisper" (with Paul Dempsey)	RocKwiz Duets 2
2007	"The Coventry Carol"	The Spirit of Christmas 2007
2010	"Saskia Hamilton" (with Ben Folds)	Lonely Avenue
2010	"From Above" (with Ben Folds)	Lonely Avenue
2010	"The One You Love" (with Passenger)	Flight of the Crow
2010	"White Wine in the Sun"	The Spirit of Christmas 2010
2011	"Asena" (with Double Dragon)	Sons Of Asena
2013	"Crazy in Love" (with Jarrad Brown)	The RocKwiz Duets: With a Little Help from Our Friends
2013	"Il n'y a pas d'amour heureux"	Mélodie Française
2014	"Baby Mine" (from Dumbo)	We Love Disney
2017	"Heaven Help My Heart"	Greatest Hits & Interpretations
2017	"The Owl and the Pussy-Cat"	Famous Friends: Celebrating 50 Years of Play School
2018	"He's My Baby"	Ladies in Black: Music from and inspired by the motion picture
2018	"Bound to Follow (Aisling Song)" (with Paul Kelly)	Nature
2020	"Blood Red Rose"	Cannot Buy My Soul: The Songs of Kev Carmody
2021	"Coventry Carol" (with Paul Kelly, Jess Hitchcock, Alice Keath and Marlon Williams)	Paul Kelly's Christmas Train
2026	"Siren (Never Let You Go)" and "Horses"	My Brilliant Career
