= The Best of Kate Miller-Heidke: Act One =

Greatest hits album by Kate Miller-Heidke
- Released: 2 December 2016
- Genre: Pop
- Label: Sony Music Australia

Kate Miller-Heidke chronology
The Rabbits (2016)	The Best of Kate Miller-Heidke: Act One (2016)	Live at the Sydney Opera House (2017)

The Best of Kate Miller-Heidke: Act One is a two-disc greatest hits album by Australian musician, Kate Miller-Heidke. The album features of Miller-Heidke's greatest hits, including the new single "You've Underestimated Me, Dude". The second disc features a collection of rarities, covers, live versions and previously unreleased material.

== Reception ==
Professional ratings
Review scores
Source	Rating
TheMusic	4/5 stars
Renowned for Sound	4/5 stars

Ross Clelland from The Music gave the album 4 out of 5, saying: "This wide-ranging introduction and overview to Kate Miller-Heidke's idiosyncratic work, features her classically-trained operatic trill colliding with some social conscience and wit to make chamber pop unlike much else. Across two discs, there's the stuff to make you think a bit, including "Caught in the Crowd" and "You've Underestimated Me, Dude" as well as wistfully emotional works such as "Drama", the quite towering "The Last Day on Earth" and the happily absurd "I'm Growing a Beard Downstairs for Christmas". If that's not enough, there's a bunch of live renditions and selections from her opera project, The Rabbits. You could say she's been busy, but you can still expect an Act Two."

Daniel Patrin from Renowned for Sound gave the album 4 stars out of 5 saying; "As well as being gently nudged to recall why this multi-award winning songstress has planted herself in the history halls of Australian music, the listener is transported to her live performances from the comfort of a living room couch. In short, it’s a goldmine for those who love great Australian music."

== Track listing ==
CD1

The Best of Kate Miller-Heidke: Act One
No.	Title	Album	Length
1.	"Space They Cannot Touch"	Little Eve	4:08
2.	"Words"	Little Eve	3:33
3.	"Mama"	Little Eve	3:05
4.	"Little Adam"	Little Eve	4:55
5.	"Can't Shake It"	Curiouser	3:16
6.	"Caught in the Crowd"	Curiouser	3:33
7.	"The Last Day on Earth"	Curiouser	4:47
8.	"Are You Fucking Kidding Me?" (live)	Live At the Hi-Fi	3:24
9.	"Walking on a Dream"	Live At the Hi-Fi (bonus track)	3:43
10.	"Ride This Feeling"	Nightflight	3:22
11.	"Sarah"	Nightflight	3:55
12.	"I'll Change Your Mind"	Nightflight	3:01
13.	"The Tiger Inside Will Eat the Child"	Nightflight	4:05
14.	"O Vertigo!"	O Vertigo!	3:17
15.	"Share Your Air" (featuring Passenger)	O Vertigo!	3:32
16.	"Drama" (featuring Drapht)	O Vertigo!	2:43
17.	"Sing to Me" (Denzal Park Mix)	O Vertigo!	3:21
18.	"I'm Growing a Beard Downstairs for Christmas" (featuring The Beards)	non-album single	3:31
19.	"You've Underestimated Me, Dude"	new recording	4:46
20.	"Where?" (with Iain Grandame)	The Rabbits (soundtrack)	4:47

CD2

Rarities, Covers and Live Versions
No.	Title	Album	Length
1.	"Dreams" / "I Love You"	Comikaze	4:10
2.	"Australian Idol"	Comikaze	4:09
3.	"Southern Cross Tattoo"	previous unreleased	3:05
4.	"White Wine in the Sun"	The Spirit Of Christmas 2010	6:07
5.	"Hey Little Girl" (live)	Nightflight (bonus track)	4:20
6.	"Love in a Stranger" (live)	Heavenly Sounds Live	4:53
7.	"Hornets" (live)	Heavenly Sounds Live	4:05
8.	"God's Gift to Women" (live)	Heavenly Sounds Live	4:32
9.	"The Devil Wears a Suit" (live)	Heavenly Sounds Live	6:00
10.	"Humiliation" (live)	Heavenly Sounds Live	5:34
11.	"In the Dark" (live)	Heavenly Sounds Live	5:03
12.	"Bliss" (live)	Heavenly Sounds Live	3:57
13.	"Yours Was the Body" (live)	Heavenly Sounds Live	3:46
14.	"O Vertigo!" (live)	Heavenly Sounds Live	3:09
15.	"Sarah" (live)	Heavenly Sounds Live	4:25
16.	"Can't Shake It" (live)	Heavenly Sounds Live	3:38
17.	"Elysian Fields" (live) (featuring the Tasmanian Symphony Orchestra)	previously unreleased	4:03

== Charts ==
Chart (2016)	Peak position
Australian Albums (ARIA)	36

== Release history ==
Country	Date	Format	Label	Catalogue
Australia	2 December 2016	2×CD, digital download	Sony Music Australia	88985395692
Australia	8 December 2023	2×LP	Sony Music Australia	19658856021
