= Child in Reverse =

Studio album by Kate Miller-Heidke
- Released: 30 October 2020
- Recorded: Melbourne
- Genre: Pop
- Length: 37:46
- Labels: Kate Miller-Heidke; EMI
- Producer: Evan Klar

Kate Miller-Heidke chronology
Live at the Sydney Opera House (2017)	Child in Reverse (2020)	The Kiss and the Abyss (2026)

Singles from Child in Reverse
- 1. "This Is Not Forever" Released: 29 May 2020; 2. "Deluded" Released: 7 August 2020; 3. "A Quiet Voice" Released: 4 September 2020; 4. "Little Roots, Little Shoots" Released: 9 October 2020

Singles from Child in Reverse (Deluxe Edition)
- 1. "You Can't Hurt Me Anymore" Released: 11 March 2022

Child in Reverse is the fifth studio album by Australian singer-songwriter Kate Miller-Heidke. The album was announced on 6 August 2020 and released on 30 October 2020.

Child in Reverse is Miller-Heidke's first studio album in six years, following on from 2014's O Vertigo!. It has been described by her team as "her most pop album yet".

At the 2021 ARIA Music Awards, Tony Espie was nominated for Engineer of the Year for work on this album.

A deluxe edition was released on 18 March 2022.

== Background ==
The album was recorded in Melbourne, produced by Evan Klar and features 11 songs about love and fear, memory and empathy, rage and redemption. Miller-Heidke said "What I love about Evan's style is his freshness, a feeling of spontaneity. Musically the whole album came together really smoothly. I think that comes across when you listen to it."

Despite her achievements in opera, musical theatre and screen production in recent years, Miller-Heidke said she keeps "..getting drawn back to pop music". Miller-Heidke said "The minimalism, the economy... I find that incredibly rewarding and challenging. It's like a quest to nail the perfect pop song. When it can be done, for me, as a listener, it's my favourite music."

== Reception ==
Professional ratings
Review scores
Source	Rating
TheMusicAU	4/5 stars

Guido Farnell from The Music AU said "Child in Reverse delivers eleven nuggets of finely crafted pop tunes that are soft, dreamy and impossibly silky smooth whilst moving to compulsive grooves." Farnell commented on Miller-Heidke's lyrics saying "[She] is in an introspective mood, dealing with difficult haunting memories, disappointment and the hurt of a broken heart" adding "the struggle is real but a light touch, with airy synths and sweet pop hooks complete with the cheeky little operatic trills Miller-Heidke likes to slip in here and there, prevents this line of thought from getting completely depressing. This approach manoeuvres the album to a place where Miller-Heidke and listeners can find inner strength rather than defeat". Farrell concluded saying the album "is adult pop music which, presented in fresh feel good tones, runs very deep."

ABC said "Miller-Heidke once again gives us appealing, boundary-pushing pop music that is always refreshing, often emotional, and as thought-provoking as you want it to be" calling the album "Refreshing, poignant and playful art-pop".

== Track listing ==
All tracks are produced by Evan Klar, except where noted.

Child in Reverse track listing
No.	Title	Writer(s)	Producer(s)	Length
1.	"Deluded"	Kate Miller-Heidke; Evan Klar; Hailey Collier		3:26
2.	"Simpatico" (featuring Mallrat)	Miller-Heidke; Klar; Collier		3:43
3.	"Born Lucky"	Miller-Heidke; Klar; Collier		2:55
4.	"Twelve Year Old Me"	Miller-Heidke; Klar; Collier		3:09
5.	"You Can't Hurt Me Anymore"	Miller-Heidke; Tobias Kuhn; Maddison Cash	Klar; Kuhn	3:42
6.	"Little Roots, Little Shoots"	Miller-Heidke; Klar; Collier; Lally Katz; Keir Nuttall		3:36
7.	"Hectic Glitter"	Miller-Heidke; Alethea Wiles		3:30
8.	"People Pleaser"	Miller-Heidke; Nuttall		3:38
9.	"A Quiet Voice"	Miller-Heidke; Klar; Kuhn; Collier	Klar; Kuhn^{[a]}	3:28
10.	"Child of Divorce"	Miller-Heidke; Klar; Nuttall; Collier		3:22
11.	"This Is Not Forever"	Miller-Heidke; Justin Stanley; Ingrid Andress	Stanley	3:17
Total length:				37:46

Child in Reverse (deluxe edition) track listing
No.	Title	Writer(s)	Producer(s)	Length
12.	"You Can't Hurt Me Anymore" (featuring Jaguar Jonze)	Miller-Heidke; Kuhn; Cash	Klar; Kuhn; Jaguar Jonze; Aidan Hogg	3:25
13.	"Amazing" (Double J - Live at the Wireless) (featuring Jess Hitchcock)	Miller-Heidke; Nuttall	Miller-Heidke	3:28
14.	"Zero Gravity" (live at ABC's New Years Eve 2020)	Miller-Heidke; Nuttall; Julian Hamilton	Miller-Heidke	3:25
15.	"I Wanna Dance with Somebody" (live at The State of Music)	George Merrill; Shannon Rubicam		3:56
16.	"Paint It Black" (live)	Keith Richards; Mick Jagger	Miller-Heidke	2:44
17.	"Deluded" (live at The Espy for The Sound)	Miller-Heidke; Klar; Collier	Miller-Heidke	3:32
18.	"People Pleaser" (live)	Miller-Heidke; Nuttall	Miller-Heidke	4:42
19.	"A Quiet Voice" (live)	Miller-Heidke; Klar; Kuhn; Collier	Miller-Heidke	4:06
20.	"You Can't Hurt Me Anymore" (live)	Miller-Heidke; Kuhn; Cash	Miller-Heidke	3:31
21.	"This Is Not Forever" (featuring Sydney Symphony Orchestra)	Miller-Heidke; Stanley; Andress	Elise McCann	3:30

Notes

- ^{^[a]} signifies a co-producer

== Charts ==
Chart performance for Child in Reverse
Chart (2020)	Peak position
Australian Albums (ARIA)	9
