= Live at the Sydney Opera House (Kate Miller-Heidke album) =

Live album by Kate Miller-Heidke with The Sydney Symphony Orchestra
- Released: 11 August 2017
- Recorded: 24–25 March 2017
- Genre: Pop
- Length: 81:33
- Label: ABC Music, Universal Music Australia

Kate Miller-Heidke albums chronology
The Best of Kate Miller-Heidke: Act One (2016)	Live at the Sydney Opera House (2017)	Child in Reverse (2020)

Live at the Sydney Opera House is a live album by Australian singer-songwriter Kate Miller-Heidke with the Sydney Symphony Orchestra. The album was recorded in March 2017 during the tour of her The Best of Kate Miller-Heidke: Act One album and released in August 2017. The album peaked at number 31 on the ARIA Charts.

Upon release, Miller-Heidke said "Performing my songs for three nights in a row with the Sydney Symphony Orchestra at the Sydney Opera House was an absolute career highlight, a crazy pinch-myself moment that even now doesn’t seem quite real. The members of the Sydney Symphony Orchestra are a dedicated, passionate group of musicians and represent the pinnacle of what it means to devote your to life to music. To perform with them at your back is, to say the least, a little intimidating. I can’t imagine bungee jumping could be any more exhilarating."

== Reception ==
Professional ratings
Review scores
Source	Rating
TheMusicAU	3.5/5 stars

Madelyn Tait from The Music AU gave the album 3.5 out of 5 saying; "Australian singer-songwriter Kate Miller-Heidke's classically trained voice and the Sydney Symphony Orchestra make the perfect combination. Her music (a blend of opera, folk and alternative pop) provides interesting material for an orchestral ensemble, but it works. Miller-Heidke's biggest pop hits like "Caught in the Crowd" and "The Last Day on Earth", songs from her short opera The Rabbits and her quirkier, comedic songs are all stripped back and fantastically, orchestrally reimagined." – adding, "Miller-Heidke's live album has it all."

== Track listing ==
1. "Bliss" – 3:57
2. "O Vertigo!" – 3:52
3. "Mama" – 3:21
4. "Caught in the Crowd" – 4:02
5. "Elysian Fields" – 4:12
6. "You've Underestimated Me, Dude" – 5:32
7. "Are You Fucking Kidding Me?" – 3:06
8. "My Sky" – 3:57
9. "Where?" – 5:08
10. "Dreams / I Love You" – 5:03
11. "Can't Shake It" – 3:29
12. "In the Dark" – 5:11
13. "Humiliation" – 6:33
14. "Sarah" – 4:35
15. "Words" – 8:58
16. "The Last Day on Earth" – 6:31

== Charts ==
Chart (2017)	Peak position
Australian Albums (ARIA)	31

== Release history ==
Country	Date	Format	Label	Catalogue
Australia	11 August 2017	CD, digital download	ABC Music, Universal Music Australia	5768885
