= Apartment (Kate Miller-Heidke song) =

Single by Kate Miller-Heidke

from the album Little Eve
- Released: April 2006
- Label: Sony BMG
- Songwriter(s): Keir Nuttall

Kate Miller-Heidke singles chronology
"Apartment" (2006)	"Words " (2007)

"Apartment" is the debut single by Australian singer Kate Miller-Heidke, released on 2006 as the lead single from Miller-Heike's third EP Circular Breathing. The song was supported by Triple J.

At the inaugural Queensland Music Awards in 2006, the song won Best Pop.
