= Bananaland (musical) =

Australian musical

- Music: Kate Miller-Heidke; Keir Nuttall
- Lyrics: Kate Miller-Heidke; Keir Nuttall
- Book: Keir Nuttal
- Premiere: 20 September 2023: Playhouse Theatre Queensland Performing Arts Centre, Brisbane
- Productions: 2023 Brisbane; 2024 Sydney

Bananaland is a musical comedy with book by Keir Nuttall and music and lyrics by Kate Miller-Heidke and Keir Nuttall. It concerns an unsuccessful punk rock protest band finding fame as a 'kids band' performing music for children.

== Production history ==
It premiered at the Playhouse, Queensland Performing Arts Centre for the Brisbane Festival, from 16 September to 1 October 2023. The production was directed by Simon Phillips and featured Max McKenna, Georgina Hopson, Maxwell Simon, Joe Kalou, Dave Eastgate, Amber McMahon and Chris Ryan. It toured to the Riverside Theatres Parramatta from 3 to 14 January 2024 for the Sydney Festival.

== Reception ==
Bananaland has been very well received. Limelight Magazine said it is "a bright and brilliant new Australian musical, bursting with colour and passion in both its message and delivery" and that it "celebrates the power of live performance and the unpredictable roller-coaster of being a working artist." In a four-star review, The Guardian described it as "a celebration of and cautionary tale about making music, as well as a thoughtful exploration of both its limits and possibilities in offering us healing, solace and acting as a force for change."

It received Queensland Matilda Awards for Best Musical or Cabaret and Best Composition and/or Sound Design (Miller-Heidke, Nuttall, James Dobinson, Joy Weng and Terry McKibbin) in February 2024.

== Original cast ==
Character	Actor
Ruby Semblance	Max McKenna
Karen Semblance	Georgina Hopson
Seb Kale	Joe Kalou
Ex	Maxwell Simon
Ron Delbridge	Dave Eastgate
Mimsi Borogroves/Others	Amber McMahon
Stephen King/Others	Chris Ryan
Female Standby/Swing	Erika Naddei
Male Standby/Swing	Mark Hill/Stephen Madsen

== Musical numbers ==
- "True North" – Ruby
- "Toby" – Karen
- "Fallback" – Ruby
- "Grow Up and Be Kids" – Ruby and Karen
- "Bananaland"
- "Consumerist Pig"
- "Requiem for the Patriarchy in D Minor"
- "The Trial of Simon Cowell"
- "Toby Use Your Inside Voice" – Karen
- "Stephen King" – Chris
