= Transport (band) =

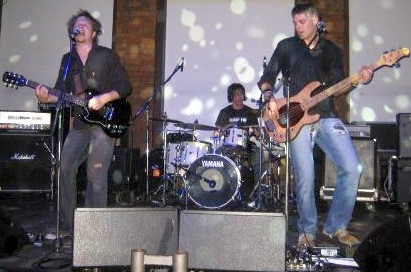
- Transport: (L-R) Keir Nuttall, Steve Pope, Scott Saunders

Background information
- Origin: Brisbane, Australia
- Genres: Indie rock, alternative rock, funk rock, alternative metal
- Years active: 2001–present
- Labels: Shock Records (Australia), MSR Music (UK)
- Website: http://www.yetanotherband.com

Transport is a three-piece independent rock band from Brisbane, Queensland, made up of Keir Nuttall (guitar, vocals), Scott Saunders (bass, vocals) and Steve Pope (drums).

== History ==
Transport was formed in 2001 when all three members were studying at the Queensland Conservatorium of Music. In 2003 they won Australia's National Campus Band Competition.

Transport also tours and records as the band of Brisbane singer and Sony-BMG artist Kate Miller-Heidke, joined by singer and violinist Sallie Campbell.

Transport's material is written and developed co-operatively by the band, and Keir Nuttall has also contributed songs to Kate Miller-Heidke's repertoire, notably her turntable hit Space They Cannot Touch from 2004's Telegram, and her 2007 single Words.

Transport's first two EPs and other songs including the single Sunday Driver were recorded by producer Guy Cooper (Serotonin Productions) on the Gold Coast.

The band has continued to record and perform independently of Kate Miller-Heidke, mainly at Brisbane venues but also on international and interstate tours, and live radio broadcasts. The band's song Sunday Driver was downloaded a record 24,000 times from the website of youth radio network Triple J, and in Britain Stone Hearted has been aired on BBC Radio 1 and on Kerrang! Radio.

In April 2007 Transport appeared at the Roxy Theatre in Los Angeles as part of the Musexpo music and media conference. In May–June 2007 the band toured independent venues in the UK as part of the CMEAS Spring Tour. Also in 2007, the band went into the studio with producer Caleb James at The Palace studios to record their debut album Inner Chimp. In November 2007 Inner Chimp was pre-released for download.

== Discography ==
=== EPs ===
- Safe No Rebounds (2004)
- Transport (2005)

=== Singles ===
- Stone Hearted (2006)

=== Albums ===
- Inner Chimp (Completed 2007 (Unreleased))
