= The Beards =

The Beards may refer to:

- The Beards (American band), members include Kim Shattuck
- The Beards (Australian band), a folk rock band
