= Little Eve =

Studio album by Kate Miller-Heidke
- Released: 26 May 2007
- Genre: Pop
- Label: Sony BMG

Kate Miller-Heidke chronology
Circular Breathing (2006)	Little Eve (2007)	Live at the Playroom (2007)

Singles from Little Eve
- 1. "Words" Released: 26 May 2007; 2. "Make It Last" Released: 4 September 2007; 3. "Space They Cannot Touch" Released: 22 March 2008

Alternative covers
- Special Edition 2CD

Alternative cover
- Special Edition CD/DVD

Professional ratings
Review scores
Source	Rating
Sauce	6/10 stars
Allmusic	4/5 stars
Answers.com	3.5/5 stars

Little Eve is the debut studio album by Australian singer-songwriter Kate Miller-Heidke. It was released on 26 May 2007 through Sony BMG, and was reissued twice, first with a bonus CD, and then with a bonus DVD. It reached number eleven on the ARIA Charts and received a gold certification.

== Release ==
The song "Make It Last" was released in September 2007 as the second single from Little Eve. The music video was directed by Stephen Lance and Mairi Cameron of Head Pictures. It features Heidke in a backyard sale, selling 'things of the past'. During the chorus, we see her and other dancing with lamps.

== Track listing ==
All songs produced by Magoo.

No.	Title	Writer(s)	Length
1.	"I Got the Way"	Kate Miller-Heidke	3:09
2.	"Make It Last"	Miller-Heidke	3:33
3.	"Words"	Keir Nuttall	3:34
4.	"Delay"	Miller-Heidke	3:36
5.	"Mama"	Miller-Heidke	3:05
6.	"Space They Cannot Touch"	Nuttall	4:08
7.	"Shoebox"	Miller-Heidke	4:12
8.	"Don't Let Go"	Miller-Heidke	3:51
9.	"Little Adam"	Nuttall	4:55
10.	"Ducks Don't Need Satellites"	Paul Hankinson	3:57
11.	"Thanks For Today"	Nuttall	3:13
12.	"Bored With Me"	Miller-Heidke	3:41

=== Double CD edition ===
Bonus disc
No.	Title	Writer(s)	Length
1.	"Apartment" (Magoo Mix)	Miller-Heidke	3:35
2.	"River"	Joni Mitchell	3:37
3.	"Psycho Killer" (Live at Spiegeltent)	David Byrne, Chris Frantz, Tina Weymouth	4:46
4.	"Ducks Don't Need Satellites" (Live at the Vanguard)	Paul Hakinson	3:06

=== CD/DVD edition ===
DVD - Live at the Chapel
No.	Title	Writer(s)	Length
1.	"Out and In"	Miller-Heidke
2.	"Little Adam"	Nuttall
3.	"Mama"	Miller-Heidke
4.	"Dreams"	Miller-Heidke
5.	"Space They Cannot Touch"	Nuttall
6.	"Australian Idol"	Miller-Heidke
7.	"You're the Voice"	Andy Qunta, Keith Reid, Maggie Ryder, Chris Thompson

DVD - Extras
No.	Title	Writer(s)	Length
1.	"Words" (Live at the 2007 ARIA Awards)	Nuttall
2.	"Speed of Red" (Live at the Chapel)	Sallie Campbell
3.	"Words" (music video)	Nuttall
4.	"Make It Last" (music video)	Miller-Heidke

== Charts ==
Chart (2007)	Peak position
Australian Albums (ARIA)	11

== Certifications ==
Region	Certification	Certified units/sales
Australia (ARIA)	Gold	35,000^{^}
^{^} Shipments figures based on certification alone.

== Release history ==
Album	Release date	Catalogue
Standard edition	16 June 2007	88697115762
Special edition 2 CD	16 June 2007	88697115772
Special edition CD/DVD	29 March 2008	88697281592
