= Comikaze =

EP by Kate Miller-Heidke
- Released: 2005
- Genre: Comedy, pop
- Label: Independent release

Kate Miller-Heidke chronology
Telegram (2004)	Comikaze (2005)	Circular Breathing (2006)

Comikaze is the second EP by Australian pop singer Kate Miller-Heidke, released in 2005. The EP was limited to a pressing of just 500 copies. According to a 2007 interview, Miller-Heidke cut further release of the EP because she saw its comedic material as a mistake.

The tracks "Australian Idol" and "Dreams / I Love You" were re-recorded on the 2016 album The Best of Kate Miller-Heidke: Act One.

In 2006, Miller-Heidke said she wrote "Australian Idol" as a joke, saying "It's basically a spoof, making fun of all the people that tell me I should go on Australian Idol. I get that about once a week. It's a shame but most people think that's what singing is and that's what being a musician is. I think auditioning for Australian Idol would destroy my credibility with one fell swoop."

== Track listing ==
No.	Title	Writer(s)	Length
1.	"Australian Idol"	Kate Miller-Heidke
2.	"Dreams / I Love You"	Miller-Heidke
3.	"Gaydar"	Miller-Heidke
4.	"Stayin' Alive"	Bee Gees

== Release history ==
Region	Date	Format	Edition(s)	Label	Catalogue
Australia	2005	CD	Standard	Kate Miller-Heidke	KMH1002
