= I'm Growing a Beard Downstairs for Christmas =

Single by Kate Miller-Heidke featuring The Beards
- Released: 27 November 2015
- Length: 3:41
- Label: Cooking Vinyl
- Songwriter(s): Kate Miller-Heidke; Keir Nuttall; Louis Schoorl

Kate Miller-Heidke singles chronology
"Offer It Up" (2014)	"I'm Growing a Beard Downstairs for Christmas" (2015)	"Where?" (2016)

"I'm Growing a Beard Downstairs for Christmas" is a song by Australian singer songwriter Kate Miller-Heidke and Australian comedy rock group The Beards released on 27 November 2015.

The song was released in aid of Bowel Cancer Australia and pokes fun at pubic beauty standards. The song, released to raise money in an annual month-long charity drive involving the growing of beards to raise awareness of bowel cancer, which affects one in 10 men in their lifetime and is the second biggest cancer killer in Australia.

Miller-Heidke said "The Beards opened for me on tour a couple of years ago, and some of their fans heckled me for not having a beard. This song is my revenge on them. Also, it taps into my sick love of Christmas songs. It's one of the poppiest, most upbeat songs I've ever written and it's my dream that it gets played at Westfield during extended Christmas shopping hours."

At the ARIA Music Awards of 2016, the song was nominated for Best Comedy Release.

== Critical reception ==
Emmy Mack from Music Feeds said "The festive carol has all of the hallmarks of a holiday classic, kicking off with jaunty piano chords, twinkling bells and jubilant lyrics about Christmas, uh, decorations." MamaMia called the song "the most awesome (and inappropriate) Christmas track of all time."
