= Telegram (EP) =

EP by Kate Miller-Heidke
- Released: 14 July 2004
- Recorded: QUT Studios
- Genre: Pop; acoustic
- Length: 32:03
- Label: Self-released (#KMH1001)
- Producer: Yanto Browning

Kate Miller-Heidke chronology
Telegram (2004)	Comikaze (2005)

Telegram is the debut EP by Australian singer-songwriter Kate Miller-Heidke. It was released independently on 14 July 2004. Miller-Heidke signed to Sony in 2006 and the song "Space They Cannot Touch" was re-recorded for inclusion on her debut studio album Little Eve (2007).

== Track listing ==
No.	Title	Writer(s)	Length
1.	"Space They Cannot Touch"	Keir Nuttall	3:54
2.	"Monster"	Kate Miller-Heidke	5:07
3.	"Hello"	Miller-Heidke	4:28
4.	"My Photo in the Newspaper"	Miller-Heidke	4:23
5.	"Blah Blah"	Miller-Heidke; Brown	4:47
6.	"The Truth"	Miller-Heidke; Nuttall	4:08
7.	"The Day After Christmas"	Nuttall	5:16
Total length:			32:03

== Release history ==
Region	Date	Format	Edition(s)	Label	Catalogue
Australia	14 July 2004	CD	Standard	Kate Miller-Heidke	KMH1001
