= Are You Ready? (Fatty Gets a Stylist song) =

Single by Fatty Gets a Stylist

from the album Fatty Gets a Stylist
- Released: June 6, 2011
- Genre: Pop, alternative
- Label: Sony BMG
- Songwriter(s): Kate Miller-Heidke

Fatty Gets a Stylist singles chronology
"Are You Ready?" (2011)	"Holloway Park" (2011)

"Are You Ready?" is a song by Australian band Fatty Gets a Stylist, led by Kate Miller-Heidke, from their debut self-titled debut album. The song was released as the album's first single, and the group's own debut single, yet failed to appear on any major charts.

== Promotion ==
"Are You Ready?" has been used in a New York Lottery advertisement on US television and for advertising the Seven Network, in which actors from various shows mime to the words while walking, ending with Alf Stewart from Home and Away yelling the end line "Let's go!".

== Music video ==
=== Montage version ===
The original video premiered on the official Fatty Gets a Stylist channel on August 14, 2010 along with a similar montage video for "The Devils In the Details", which premiered the day before.

The video features footage from the early 20th century of day-to-day scenery and activities in the countryside, then the last two thirds of the video show a country parade. The concept of the video is the country down "getting ready" for the parade.

=== Music video version ===
The official version of the video premiered on 15 July 2011 on Fatty Gets s Stylist's VEVO channel.

The video opens with the words "ARE YOU READY?" in a 70's disco setting, before Miller-Heidke and Keir Nuttall are shown with papier-mâché sculpted heads (featured on the single's artwork, as well as several of the band's promotional photoshoots) in a housing estate, starring as "Miss Fatima" and "Mr. K". The video then proceeds with pre-credits of the children appearing in the video, as well as "Buddy the Dog". "Miss Fatima" and "Mr. K" proceed to skip through the estate, and the children start to follow them, and join in a childish dance. The children's eyes start to glow red, and on the line "The horns!" a marching band come out of the houses, and form a circle around the children, who surround the two teacher characters, and kill them with red lasers shooting out of their eyes.

== Track listing ==
- Digital download
1. "Are You Ready?" – 3:05
