= Circular Breathing =

EP by Kate Miller-Heidke
- Released: April 2006
- Genre: Pop
- Label: Sony BMG

Kate Miller-Heidke chronology
Comikaze (2005)	Circular Breathing (2006)	Little Eve (2007)

Circular Breathing is the third Extended play by Australian singer-songwriter Kate Miller-Heidke. It was her first to be released with a major music company, Sony BMG.

The EP was supported by The Apartment Tour throughout 2006.

== Singles ==
"Apartment" was the only single to be released from Circular Breathing in April 2006. There was a promotional music video made for the song which featured her and some other band members performing the song live.

== Track listing ==
No.	Title	Writer(s)	Length
1.	"Out and In"	Kate Miller-Heidke	3:59
2.	"Jamie"	Keir Nuttall	4:03
3.	"Apartment"	Miller-Heidke	3:34
4.	"Caveman Days"	Miller-Heidke	2:55
5.	"Four Spare Seats"	Nuttall	3:54
6.	"River of Dreams"	Nuttall	5:03

== Charts ==
Chart (2006)	Peak position
Australia Independent (AIR)	4

== Release history ==
Country	Release date	Format	Label	Catalogue
Australia	22 April 2006	Digital Download, CD	Sony BMG	82876828902
