= The Kiss and the Abyss =

Studio album by Kate Miller-Heidke
- Released: 14 August 2026
- Length: 48:21
- Labels: Kate Miller-Heidke; UMA
- Producer: Tom Iansek

Kate Miller-Heidke chronology
| Child in Reverse (2020) | The Kiss and the Abyss (2026) |

Singles from The Kiss and the Abyss
- 1. "Holiday" Released: 12 June 2026; 2. "A Certain Panic" Released: 17 July 2026; 3. "Butterflies" Released: 14 August 2026

The Kiss and the Abyss is the sixth studio album by the Australian singer-songwriter Kate Miller-Heidke. The album was announced in June 2026 and released on 14 August 2026.

Upon release, Miller-Heidke told The Music, "The main guiding principle for these songs was gothic folk. I grew up loving folk music, obviously, and that's how I became a songwriter. My early stuff is all pretty folky, but I think what I love about the gothic element is that it allows me to make folk music theatrical, more experimental and expansive – even a little weirder than traditional folk music, too."

== Reception ==
HiFi Way described the album saying "Across eleven songs, The Kiss and the Abyss navigates beauty and darkness in equal measure, drawing on gothic folk traditions while remaining unmistakably Kate Miller-Heidke: fearless, emotionally raw and impossible to pin down."

Brooke Gibbs from Future Music Mag said "The Kiss and the Abyss is strange, beautiful, theatrical, vulnerable and occasionally delightfully dark — but more than anything, it feels free."

Hayley from Hear 2 Zen said "the partnership between Kate and Keir has shown time and time again to be something pretty special. Their love for storytelling and sharing music is evident throughout this album" calling it "..so real. So deep and truly beautiful."

== Track listing ==
All tracks are written by Kate Miller-Heidke and Keir Nuttall.

The Kiss and the Abyss track listing
| No. | Title | Length |
|---|---|---|
| 1. | "Hidden Things" | 5:51 |
| 2. | "Butterflies" | 3:56 |
| 3. | "Isabella Don't" | 2:55 |
| 4. | "Love Sweet Love" | 3:16 |
| 5. | "Little Ants" | 4:02 |
| 6. | "Holiday" | 3:51 |
| 7. | "A Certain Panic" | 4:31 |
| 8. | "Canterbury Stone" | 5:26 |
| 9. | "The Muscle" | 3:57 |
| 10. | "Elephant" | 5:16 |
| 11. | "Overflow" | 5:20 |
| Total length: | | 48:21 |

== Personnel ==
Credits are adapted from Tidal.

- Kate Miller-Heidke – vocals (all tracks), background vocals (1)
- Tom Iansek – production, engineering, mixing (all tracks); guitar, percussion (track 1); keyboards (2, 3, 5–8, 10, 11), bass (2, 3, 7, 10), background vocals (7, 8, 11), acoustic guitar (7, 11)
- Alex Killpatrick – engineering
- Steve Fallone – mastering
- Lloyd Haines – drums (1–3, 6, 7, 9, 10)
- Keir Nuttall – guitar (1, 2, 5, 6, 8 9), background vocals (1, 6, 8), sound effects (5, 6), electric guitar (7)
- Isaac Hayward – piano (1, 3, 4, 6, 8, 9, 11); Hammond organ, pump organ (1); organ (4, 8), bass (8), synthesizer (9, 11)
- Georgia Mooney – background vocals (1, 3, 6–9)
- Alexandra Partridge – cello (4, 5, 11)
- Andy Crothers – viola (4, 5, 11)
- Ioana Tache – violin (4, 5, 11)
- Madeleine Jevons – violin (4, 5, 11)
- Aaron Dobos – engineering (4, 5, 11)
- Isaac Gunno – fretless bass guitar (6, 8)
- Amber Scates – background vocals (11)
- Jaymee Lancaster – background vocals (11)
- Nethra Raman – background vocals (11)
- Nicholas Walsh – background vocals (11)
- Samira Aly – cello (11)

== Charts ==
Chart performance for The Kiss and the Abyss
| Chart (2026) | Peak position |
|---|---|
| Australian Albums (ARIA) | 11 |
