= Lally Katz =

Australian dramatist and screenwriter

- Born: December 3, 1978 (age 47); New Jersey, United States
- Occupation: Writer

Lally Katz (born 1978 or 1979) is an American and Australian dramatist writing for theater, film, and television.

== Early life ==
Katz was born in New Jersey, United States. She moved with her family to Miami, and then to Canberra, Australia when she was eight. She moved to Melbourne when she was eighteen to attend university and pursue a career as a playwright. She graduated from the University of Melbourne's School of Studies in Creative Arts. She trained with the Australian Theatre for Young People in 2000. She studied playwriting at London's Royal Court Theatre.

== Career ==
Katz began her career self-producing her own plays in Melbourne, Australia when she was eighteen. From there she began to get commissions to write for Youth Theatre Companies such as St Martins Youth Theatre and PACT Youth Theatre. When she was 23, she joined Stuck Pigs Squealing Theatre Company.

Stuck Pigs Squealing Theatre produced a series of Katz's early plays: The Black Swan of Trespass which played at Malthouse, Belvoir, and the New York International Fringe Festival where it won the Producer's Choice Award after winning several Green Room Awards in Melbourne; Eisteddfod premiered in Melbourne at the Storeroom Theatre and transferred to Malthouse Theatre, Belvoir and PS 122 and Richard Foreman's Ontological-Hysteric Theatre in New York City.

After several successful shows with Stuck Pigs Squealing, Katz began to receive commissions from Australia's main-stage theatre companies.

In 2007 Katz co-wrote Criminology with Australian playwright Tom Wright, which was produced by Malthouse Theatre and Arena Theatre, and two short plays Waikiki Palace and Hip Hip Hooray formed a double bill premiering at Sydney Theatre Company that same year.

Katz's adaptation of Frankenstein was directed by Ralph Myers at Sydney Theatre Company in 2008.

Goodbye New York, Goodbye Heart opened in New York in late 2010. The Apocalypse Bear Trilogy played at the Melbourne Theatre Company as part of the Melbourne International Arts Festival in 2009. Katz adapted stories from the bible for The Mysteries: Genesis at Sydney Theatre Company in 2008. When the Hunter Returns was commissioned and produced by The Gaiety School of Acting in Ireland and had a return season at the Dublin Theatre Festival. Her play Goodbye Vaudeville Charle Mudd premiered at Malthouse Theatre (co-produced by Arena Theatre).

In 2011 she had three premieres on the main stages of Australia: A Golem Story at Malthouse Theatre, Neighbourhood Watch at Belvoir, and Return to Earth at Melbourne Theatre Company.

Starchaser, a play for children, was produced by Arena Theatre in 2012 and performed at the Arts Centre Melbourne.

In 2013 Katz's one-woman show, Stories I Want to Tell You in Person, played to packed audiences at Belvoir and Malthouse Theatre. It later toured to Joe's Pub in New York, Mexico City and other cities in Australia before being adapted into a two-part television series for the ABC starring Katz and Robyn Nevin.

In 2014 Katz adapted Henrik Ibsen's A Doll's House for La Boite Theatre Company and Brisbane Festival, directed by Steven Mitchell Wright.

In 2015 Katz's play The Cat was part of a sold-out double bill with Brendan Cowell's The Dog at Belvoir in Sydney. She also wrote the libretto for The Rabbits, composed by Kate Miller Heidke, which premiered at Perth Festival and then had sold out season in Melbourne and Sydney Festivals, going on to win several Helpmann Awards, including the award for Best New Australian Work. It also won the Australian Writer's Guild Award for best libretto.

In 2017 The Cat/The Dog was remounted for another sold-out season at Belvoir. That year Katz had a premiere of her play Minnie & Liraz at Melbourne Theatre Company.

Katz participated in the attachment programme at the Studio at the National Theatre in London in 2009 and won a British Council Realise Your Dreams grant for 2010. She was a Churchill Fellow in 2010 and was appointed a Writer In Residence at University of Melbourne in 2011. In 2012 Katz won InStyle Magazine's Women of Style Award in the arts category and in 2013 she was the inaugural recipient of an Australian Writers' Foundation Playwriting Grant.

Katz's work for television includes adult one-hour dramas Wonderland, Wentworth, and Spirited and children's series The Elephant Princess. Stories I Want to Tell You in Person was adapted as a two-part television series by the ABC in 2017, starring Katz and Robyn Nevin. She has also written for Squinters seasons one and two and for Hit The Road starring Jason Alexander.

In 2024, Katz was named as part of the writing team for Stan series Sunny Nights.

== Awards ==
The Eisteddfod won the Excellence in Direction and Producer's Choice awards at the 2004 New York International Fringe Festival.

Her 2009 play, Goodbye Vaudeville, Charlie Mudd, was performed in the Beckett Theatre at the Malthouse and received the State Library of Victoria's Louis Esson Prize for Drama.

== Works ==
=== Plays ===
Year	Title	Notes
2003	Eisteddfod	Directed by Chris Kohn
2005	Smashed	
2005	The Black Swan of Trespass	written with Chris Kohn
2006	Lally Katz and the Terrible Mysteries of the Volcano	directed by Chris Kohn
2007	Hip Hip Hooray	
2007	Waikiki Palace	
2007	Criminology	Co-written with Tom Wright
2008	Frankenstein	
2008	When the Hunter Returns	
2008	The Mysteries: Genesis	
2008	The Apocalypse Bear Trilogy	
2009	Return to Earth	
2009	Goodbye Vaudeville Charlie Mudd	won the 2009 Louis Esson Prize for Drama
2010	Goodbye New York, Goodbye Heart	
2011	A Golem Story	directed by Michael Kantor
2011	Neighbourhood Watch	
2012	Starchaser	
2013	Stories I Want to Tell You in Person	One-woman show
2014	A Doll's House	
2015	The Rabbits	
2015	The Cat (part of The Dog / The Cat)	
2016	Back at the Dojo	Autobiographical play
2017	Minnie and Liraz	
2017	Atlantis	Autobiographical play

=== Screenplays ===
Year	Title	Notes
2006	Ingrid Sits Holding a Knife	Short film
2009	The Apocalypse Bear: Beyond the Sea	Short film
2013	Greg's First Day	Short film

=== TV scripts ===
Year	Title	Notes	Ref.
2008	The Elephant Princess	Episode: "Masquerade Ball"	
2011	Spirited	Episode: "Blood Sugar Sex Magik"	
2013	Wentworth	Episode: "Mind Games", with Emma J. Steele	
2014	Celblok H	Episode: "Mind Games" (Dutch adaptation of her original Australian script)4	
2015	Stories I Want to Tell You in Person	adapted from her one woman show	
2018	Squinters		
2025	Sunny Nights	Writer	
