= Emma Dean (musician) =

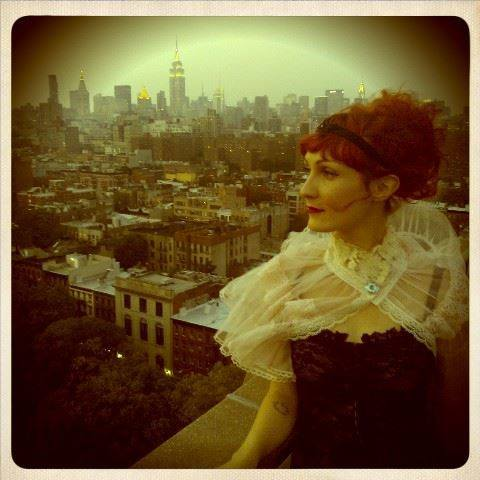
- Dean in New York City skyline 2013

Background information
- Born: Emma Kate Dean
- Origin: Brisbane, Australia
- Genres: Theatrical pop, alternative,
- Occupations: Singer-songwriter, musician
- Instruments: Vocals, piano, violin
- Years active: 1998–present
- Label: Doily/CandyRat Records
- Website: www.emmadean.com
- Education: Queensland Conservatorium Griffith University

Emma Kate Dean is an Australian singer-songwriter and multi-instrumentalist from Brisbane, Queensland. She has performed in solo shows and her Emma Dean Band as well as with the Kate Miller-Heidke Band (2003–2006). The Emma Dean Band was formed in 2005 with Emma's brother, Tony Dean on drums, Dane Pollock on guitar, John Turnbull on bass guitar and Rachel Meredith on cello.

Dean is a graduate of the Queensland Conservatorium Griffith University.

== Discography ==
=== Albums ===
List of albums, with selected details
Title	Details
Real Life Computer Game	Released: June 2008; Label: Doily Records (Doily200801); Format: CD
Dr. Dream and the Imaginary Pop Cabaret	Released: June 2010; Label: Doily Records (Doily201001); Format: CD
White Red Black	Released: 2014; Label: Format: digital, CD; Note: Compiles the 3x 2013 EPs.
Shape of a Girl	Released: November 2021; Label: Emma Dean; Format: digital

=== Extended plays ===
List of EPs, with selected details
Title	Details
Hanging Out the Washing	Released: 2005; Label: Emma Dean (ED0705); Format: CD
Face Painter	Released: 2006; Label: Emma Dean (ED1006); Format: CD
Into the Woods (As Geppetto with Jake Diefenbach)	Released: October 2012; Label: Geppetto; Format: digital
White	Released: 2013; Label: Emma Dean; Format: digital
Red	Released: 2013; Label: Emma Dean; Format: digital
Black	Released: 2013; Label: Emma Dean; Format: digital
Feast (As Emma and the Hungry Truth)	Released: 2014; Label: Emma Dean; Format: digital
Broken Romantics: A Vicious Song Cycle	Released: 2017; Label: Emma Dean; Format: digital

== Awards ==
=== Queensland Music Awards ===
The Queensland Music Awards (previously known as Q Song Awards) are annual awards celebrating Queensland, Australia's brightest emerging artists and established legends. They commenced in 2006.

Year	Nominee / work	Award	Result (wins only)	Ref.
2026	"I Don't Have a Chimney" by Joff Bush featuring Emma Dean	Children's Music Award	Won	
