= Fatty Gets a Stylist (album) =

Studio album by Fatty Gets a Stylist
- Released: 1 July 2011
- Recorded: 2010–2011
- Genre: Pop, alternative
- Length: 42:02
- Label: Sony Music Entertainment
- Producer: Keir Nuttall

Singles from Fatty Gets a Stylist
- 1. "Holloway Park" Released: 7 September 2010; 2. "Are You Ready?" Released: 3 June 2011

Fatty Gets a Stylist is the first and only album by Australian band Fatty Gets a Stylist, composed of singer-songwriter Kate Miller-Heidke and her husband and songwriting partner Keir Nuttall. The album was released on 1 July 2011 and peaked at number 90 on the ARIA Albums Chart. In the US it was titled Liberty Bell and released as Miller-Heidke's third solo album. It was released in October 2011 and yielded two singles, "Are You Ready?", which achieved popularity after its use in a New York Lottery campaign and on advertisements for the Seven Network in Australia, and "Holloway Park".

== Track listing ==
No.	Title	Length
1.	"Are You Ready?"	3:05
2.	"The Devil's in the Details"	4:02
3.	"Liberty Bell"	3:34
4.	"The Tiger Inside Will Eat the Child"	4:02
5.	"Holloway Park"	3:59
6.	"Let Me Fade"	3:50
7.	"You Got the World"	3:39
8.	"Better in Spain"	3:45
9.	"Fatty Gets a Stylist"	3:36
10.	"The Flasher"	3:37
11.	"The Plane Went Down"	4:53

== Charts ==
Chart (2011)	Peak position
Australian Albums (ARIA)	90

== Release history ==
Country	Release date	Format	Label	Catalogue
Australia	1 July 2011	CD, Digital Download	Sony BMG	88697795442
United States	11 October 2011	CD, Digital Download	Sony BMG	88697795442
