= The Last Day on Earth =

2009 single by Kate Miller-Heidke

Single by Kate Miller-Heidke

from the album Curiouser
- Released: 24 July 2009
- Recorded: Sound City, Sonora Recorders (Los Angeles); Hot Pie Recording (Pasadena, California)
- Genre: Pop rock; soft rock
- Length: 4:47
- Label: Sony Music
- Songwriters: Kate Miller-Heidke; Keir Nuttall
- Producers: Mickey Petralia; Keir Nuttall

Kate Miller-Heidke singles chronology
"Caught in the Crowd" (2009)	"The Last Day on Earth" (2009)	"I'll Change Your Mind" (2012)

Music video
- "The Last Day on Earth" on YouTube

"The Last Day on Earth" is a song by Australian singer Kate Miller-Heidke, written by herself with her husband Keir Nuttall, who also produced the song alongside Mickey Petralia. It was released on 24 July 2009 as the third and final single from Miller-Heidke's second studio album, Curiouser (2008).

== Background and release ==
The song, initially not intended for release as a single, was used in promo advertisements for Australian soap opera Neighbours, and in result it began selling digitally by peaking at number 2 on iTunes. With the debut on the ARIA Singles Chart at number 35, it was announced that the song would be released as a physical single.

After the release of the physical single, released on 24 July 2009, it shortly became a huge success for Miller-Heidke, making a dramatic leap from number 35 to number 7, becoming therefore her first ever top ten hit song. For six weeks it peaked at number 3 on the ARIA Singles Chart and also reached number 1 on the ARIA Australian Artist Singles Chart, staying there for 6 weeks in a row. In total, "The Last Day on Earth" lasted in the top 50 for 25 weeks.

In 2009, "The Last Day on Earth" was nominated for Single of the Year at the 2009 ARIA Awards.

The song was also used on the show Piers Morgan's Life Stories on 31 October 2009, in a segment where Dannii Minogue as a guest discussing sister Kylie's cancer. The episode achieved the series' best ratings with 4.5 million viewers for its first broadcast. Beyond that, the song was used on the spin-off episode of the TV series I'm a Celebrity...Get Me Out of Here!, as well as used on the American TV show The Big C and on the Australian TV show Dance Academy.

== Music video ==
The music video was filmed by Mark Alston in a house on the Northern Beaches of Sydney and released on 3 August 2009 through the official Miller-Heidke page on Facebook.

The Mark Alston directed music video was nominated for Best Video at the ARIA Music Awards of 2009.

== Track listing ==
1. "The Last Day on Earth" – 4:47

== Charts ==
=== Weekly charts ===
Chart (2009)	Peak position
Australia (ARIA)	3

=== Year-end charts ===
Chart (2009)	Position
Australia (ARIA)	10

=== Decade-end charts ===
Chart (2000–2009)	Rank
Australia (ARIA)	57

== Certifications ==
Region	Certification	Certified units/sales
Australia (ARIA)	3× Platinum	210,000^{^}
^{^} Shipments figures based on certification alone.

== Release history ==
Region	Date	Format	Label	Ref.
Australia	24 July 2009	CD single; digital download	Sony Music	
