= The Rabbits =

Music theatre work

The Rabbits is a music theatre work with music by Kate Miller-Heidke and libretto by Lally Katz (with additional music by Iain Grandage), based on the book by John Marsden illustrated by Shaun Tan. As per the original book, it is an allegory for the colonisation of Australia, depicting an invasion of rabbits (in lieu of the English settlers) described as alien, harsh and greedy, as they destroy the land and lives of the native marsupials (in lieu of the original Indigenous population).

== Productions ==
In 2014, Lyndon Terracini announced that Opera Australia had co-commissioned Miller-Heidke to write an opera based on John Marsden's children's book The Rabbits, to be performed in 2015.

The Rabbits was first performed at the Perth International Arts Festival in February 2015, produced by Opera Australia and Barking Gecko Theatre Company, to critical acclaim. It later played seasons at the Melbourne Festival in October 2015, the Sydney Festival in January 2016 and the Queensland Performing Arts Centre in March 2016.

The Rabbits received four 2015 Helpmann Awards, for Best New Australian Work, Best Original Score, Best Presentation for Children and Best Costume Design. Katz received the 2016 AWGIE Award for Music Theatre for The Rabbits' libretto.

== Soundtrack ==
The Rabbits

Cast recording by Kate Miller-Heidke
- Released: April 2016
- Studios: Roslyn Packer Theatre Walsh Bay, Sydney
- Label: ABC Classics
- Producer: Toby Chadd

Kate Miller-Heidke chronology
O Vertigo! (2014)	The Rabbits (2016)	The Best of Kate Miller-Heidke: Act One (2016)

The cast recording was recorded live during The Rabbits' Sydney season, and released in April 2016. It was nominated for Best Original Soundtrack/Cast/Show Album at the 2016 ARIA Awards.

=== Track listing ===
1. "Dawn Chorus" - 2:53
2. "Flinch's Dream" - 3:40
3. "The Scientist's Contraption" - 0:59
4. "First Encounter" - 4:56
5. "Years Pass Transition" - 0:30
6. "Seasick Waltz" - 6:34
7. "Watching From Trees" - 3:27
8. "Rabbit Utopia" - 5:38
9. "My Sky" - 3:55
10. "Tea & War" - 7:10
11. "Kite Song" - 5:20
12. "Electric Light" - 3:12
13. "Millions" - 5:40
14. "Where?" - 5:22
15. "Billabong Epilogue" - 2:27
16. "Where?" (Acoustic Version) (bonus track) - 4:47
