= Nightflight (Kate Miller-Heidke album) =

Studio album by Kate Miller-Heidke
- Released: 13 April 2012
- Recorded: 2011
- Genres: Pop, indie
- Length: 45:00
- Label: Sony
- Producers: Keir Nuttall, Lindsay Gravina

Kate Miller-Heidke chronology
Live at the Hi-Fi (2009)	Nightflight (2012)	O Vertigo! (2014)

Singles from Nightflight
- 1. "I'll Change Your Mind" Released: 27 April 2012; 2. "Sarah" Released: 8 February 2013; 3. "Ride This Feeling" Released: 5 July 2013

Nightflight is the third studio album by Australian singer-songwriter Kate Miller-Heidke, although her fourth overall. It was released on 13 April 2012 in Australia as both a standard single-disc edition and a deluxe two-disc edition.

== Release ==
The song "I'll Change Your Mind" was released in April 2012 as the lead single from Nightflight. It was accompanied by a music video, which premiered on 6 May 2012 on Miller-Heidke's official YouTube channel. In the video, Miller-Heidke is seen in court with her romantic interest, where she is given a restraining order. At home, Miller-Heidke then packs her car full of her possessions, and drives to her romantic interest's house, and breaks in using a key from under the floor mat, and makes dolls of the two of them out of pillows. She then proceeds to camp outside her interest's house, and when he tries to call the police, he finds his phone line cut. The next morning, he throws out the two pillow dolls and boards up his house. At night, when he is still doing this, Miller-Heidke crawls in through the window, and grabs a knife. Standing in front of her interest, she then stabs herself in her chest, and pulls her heart out, holding it in her hands, literally giving him her heart. The video ends as her interest looks on in horror.

The video for "I'll Change Your Mind" was rated MA 15+ by the Australian Classification Board for strong violence. The music video was nominated for Best Video at the ARIA Music Awards of 2012.

== Critical reception ==
Nightflight received positive reviews from critics. Jeff Jenkins of Stack.net gave the album 3.5 out of 4 Stars. Josh Donellan of Rave Magazine gave the album 3.5 out of 4 Stars as well, saying that it is "Pop music for clever people" and said that "Nightflight is clever, insightful and revealing" and that "[it] is a force to be reckoned with.". Iain Shedden of The Australian gave the album 4 out of 5 Stars. Brag Magazine gave the album 4 out of 5 stars, calling it a masterpiece. Noel Mengel of Brisbane's The Courier Mail gave the album 4.5 out of 5 stars.

== Track listing ==
No.	Title	Writer(s)	Length
1.	"Ride This Feeling"	Kate Miller-Heidke, Keir Nuttall	3:23
2.	"Sarah"	Miller-Heidke, Nuttall	3:55
3.	"Nightflight"	Miller-Heidke, Nuttall	5:05
4.	"The Tiger Inside Will Eat the Child"	Nuttall	4:03
5.	"Let Me Fade"	Miller-Heidke	3:49
6.	"I'll Change Your Mind"	Miller-Heidke, Nuttall	3:01
7.	"Humiliation"	Miller-Heidke, Nuttall	4:23
8.	"In the Dark"	Miller-Heidke, Nuttall	4:31
9.	"Beautiful Darling"	Miller-Heidke, Nuttall	4:02
10.	"The Devil Wears a Suit"	Miller-Heidke, Nuttall	4:46
11.	"Fire and Iron"	Miller-Heidke, Nuttall	4:02

Bonus disc – Deluxe edition
No.	Title	Writer(s)	Length
1.	"Mother and Sun"	Miller-Heidke, Nuttall	4:06
2.	"Your Friends Will Tell You Who You Are"	Miller-Heidke, Nuttall	4:37
3.	"Hey Little Girl" (Live)	Iva Davies	4:20
4.	"In the Dark" (Live)	Miller-Heidke, Nuttall	3:39
5.	"The Devil Wears a Suit" (Live)	Miller-Heidke, Nuttall	4:36
6.	"Fire and Iron" (Live)	Miller-Heidke, Nuttall	4:00
7.	"Starlings"	Miller-Heidke, Nuttall	3:16

== Charts and certifications ==
=== Weekly charts ===
Chart (2012)	Peak position
Australian Albums (ARIA)	2

=== Year-end charts ===
Year	Chart	Rank
2012	Australian Artist ARIA End of year Chart	32

== Release history ==
Country	Release date	Format	Label	Catalogue
Australia	13 April 2012	CD, Digital Download	Sony BMG	88691974412
