= The Beards (Australian band) =

Australian comedy folk rock band

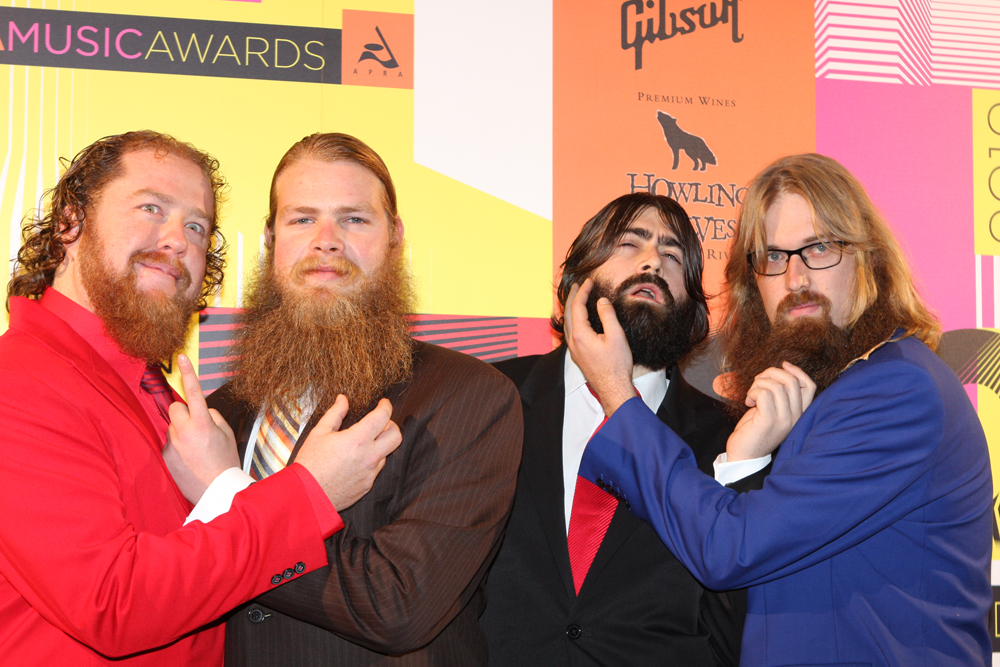
- The Beards at APRA Awards, May 2012

Background information
- Also known as: The Dairy Brothers
- Origin: Adelaide, South Australia, Australia
- Genres: rock; folk rock; comedy
- Years active: 2005–2016, 2025
- Label: Unsigned
- Past members: Tom Bettany (a.k.a. Nathaniel Beard); Michael Bidstrup (a.k.a. John Beardman, Jr.); Joshua Fielder (a.k.a. Facey McStubblington); Joel McMillan (a.k.a. Johann Beardraven)
- Website: thebeards.com.au

The Beards are an Australian folk rock band, which formed in 2005 in Adelaide and disbanded in October 2016. The group play music themed around the virtues of having a beard. They had developed from a four-piece rock band, the Dairy Brothers, which was established in 2003. In 2025, the band reunited for Byron Bay Bluesfest, and subsequently booked a national reunion tour.

== Career ==
=== 2003–2007: The Dairy Brothers ===
The Dairy Brothers were a four-piece rock band based in Adelaide, which formed in 2003, and performed at local pubs and clubs. The band members were Tom Bettany (a.k.a. Tom Rockchild) on bass keytar and vocals, Michael Bidstrup (a.k.a. Bam Bam Bidstrup) on drums, Joshua Fielder (a.k.a. J-Wah!) on guitar and Joel McMillan (a.k.a. Late Joel Milkowski or One Hundred Dollars) on vocals and keyboard. The Dairy Brothers released a six-track extended play, Full Cream Ahead (2004), and followed with a second EP, Got Rock? (February 2007).

Andrew Crosbie of MediaSearch caught a performance in Melbourne in December 2006, "their sound, although not completely original, is a breath of fresh air into what can be a slightly stale Australian rock scene. They combine the humorous lyrical stylings of Tenacious D with the driving piano of earlier Ben Folds and a guitar sound that shifts through pinnacle elements of rock from the past thirty years, giving a performance that will keep you in a well humoured and merry state of being."

=== 2005–2009: Formation and early years ===
Bettany, Bidstrup, Fielder and McMillan formed the Beards in 2005 in Adelaide to play a one-off show. They rose in popularity and developed a cult following with the release of their first album, The Beards, in July 2007. The band played at the Adelaide venue of Big Day Out in 2008 and 2009. They were active in the Adelaide music scene but were largely unknown beyond their hometown.

In 2009 they released a follow-up album, Beards Beards Beards, and a music video for "If Your Dad Doesn't Have a Beard, You've Got Two Mums", which received positive acclamations and garnered increased interest online, as well as airtime on Australian Broadcasting Corporation music video program, rage. The Beards travelled to Alaska to perform at the opening ceremony of the World Beard & Moustache Championships. Upon returning to Adelaide, the band began to tour Australia for the first time.

=== 2009–2016: Tours and further releases ===
The Beards went on to tour Australia extensively, releasing their third album Having a Beard is the New Not Having a Beard and producing music videos for the tracks "Got Me a Beard", "Beard Accessory Store", and "You Should Consider Having Sex With a Bearded Man", with the last of these coming 99th place in Triple J's Top 100 list of 2011.

In 2012, "You Should Consider Having Sex with a Bearded Man" was nominated for an APRA Award (song of the year) and the band's third album (Having a Beard is the New Not Having a Beard) was nominated for an ARIA Award (best comedy album).

In 2013 the band travelled to North America, playing multiple performances at SXSW and Canadian Music Week as well as performing showcase sets in LA, Houston, New York and Toronto. They returned to Australia, performing at Bluesfest in Byron Bay. In May 2013, they embarked on the First World Tour, playing shows in Netherlands, Germany, Belgium and the UK, where they appeared at the Bearded Theory Festival, before returning home for the Australian leg of the tour.

In early 2014, The Beards travelled Europe on the Euro-Bout To Grow A Beard Tour with stops in Britain (Stereo, Glasgow; The Glee Club, Nottingham; The Black Box, Belfast), Denmark, The Netherlands and Germany. In Cologne a 90-minute show was recorded for Rockpalast.

On 9 May 2014, The Beards released their fourth studio album, The Beard Album. This coincided with an Australian launch tour, which continued on to Europe in November and December. They stopped again in UK, Denmark, The Netherlands and Germany with additional stops in France, Sweden, Norway and Switzerland. The Beards released the music video of Strokin' My Beard in July 2015. It consists of footage of their last tour shot by fans in the audience.

To celebrate their 10th anniversary as a band, The Beards released a 2-disc compilation/live album Ten Long Years, One Long Beard, featuring never before heard songs and versions, as well as a live concert recording. A new single, also called "Ten Long Years, One Long Beard" was released with an accompanying music video. The Beards' anniversary tour Ten Long Years, One Long Beard started in September 2015 with stops in Sweden, Denmark, Germany, The Netherlands, Switzerland and the UK, before returning home to finish the tour in Australia.

In 2016, the band members announced their decision to discontinue the band as a live touring act. A Farewell Tour commenced in February 2016, with the final date booked for 28 October at The Governor Hindmarsh Hotel ("The Gov") in Adelaide. Bettany later recalled, "After cutting our teeth on the local scene following high school and during uni we formed a band called The Dairy Brothers which actually landed us a Front Bar residency at The Gov. At the time were so stoked to be actually playing at The Gov; was a bit of a dream to be playing there. The Dairy Brothers slowly morphed into The Beards and that became our life for over a decade; something we never could have predicted happening!"

=== 2025: Bluesfest reunion ===
In September 2024, the band announced they would be reuniting for the final Byron Bay Bluesfest in 2025. In April 2025, the band announced a run of four shows scheduled for August.

== Members ==
- Johann Beardraven (Joel McMillan) – lead vocals, keyboards, keytar, saxophone
- John Beardman, Jr. (Michael Bidstrup) – drums
- Nathaniel Beard (Tom Bettany) – bass guitar, backing vocals
- Facey McStubblington (Joshua Fielder) – guitar, electric guitar, backing vocals

== Discography ==
=== Studio albums ===
Title	Details	Peak chart positions
Title	Details	AUS
The Beards	Released: 21 July 2007; Label: Spare Room Audio	—
Beards, Beards, Beards	Released: 7 May 2010; Label: Spare Room Audio (BBB-01)	—
Having a Beard is the New Not Having a Beard	Released: 9 March 2012; Label: Spare Room Audio (BBB-03)	63
The Beard Album	Released: 9 May 2014; Label: Spare Room Audio (BBB-04)	30

=== Compilation albums ===
Title	Details
Ten Long Years, One Long Beard	Released: 4 September 2015; Label: Spare Room Audio (BBB-05)
The Final Show	Released: 2017; available on Limited Edition USB-Stick "Comb"; filmed 28 October 2016 at The Governor Hindmarsh Hotel, Adelaide

=== Singles ===
Title	Year	Album
"Growing a Beard"	2007	The Beards
"If Your Dad Doesn't Have a Beard, You've Got Two Mums"	2009	Beards, Beards, Beards
"You Should Consider Having Sex with a Bearded Man"	2011	Having A Beard Is the New Not Having a Beard
"I'm in the Mood... For Beards"	2012	Having A Beard Is the New Not Having a Beard
"Got Me A Beard"	2012	Having A Beard Is the New Not Having a Beard
"All the Bearded Ladies"	2014	The Beard Album
"Stroking My Beard"	2015	The Beard Album
"I'm Growing a Beard Downstairs for Christmas" (with Kate Miller-Heidke)	2015	non album single

== Awards and nominations ==
=== APRA Music Awards ===
The APRA Awards are held in Australia and New Zealand by the Australasian Performing Right Association to recognise songwriting skills, sales and airplay performance by its members annually.

Year	Nominee / work	Award	Result
2012	You Should Consider Having Sex with a Bearded Man"	Song of the Year	Nominated

=== ARIA Music Awards ===
The ARIA Music Awards is an annual awards ceremony that recognises excellence, innovation, and achievement across all genres of Australian music. They were nominated for three awards.

Year	Nominee / work	Award	Result	Ref.
2012	Having a Beard Is the New Not Having a Beard	Best Comedy Release	Nominated	
2014	The Beards Album	Best Comedy Release	Nominated	
2016	"I'm Growing a Beard Downstairs for Christmas" (with Kate Miller-Heidke)	Best Comedy Release	Nominated	

=== Fowler's Live Music Awards ===
The Fowler's Live Music Awards took place from 2012 to 2014 to "recognise success and achievement over the past 12 months [and] celebrate the great diversity of original live music" in South Australia. Since 2015 they're known as the South Australian Music Awards.

Year	Nominee / work	Award	Result (wins only)
2012	"You Should Consider Having Sex with a Bearded Man"	Best Video	Won
2013	The Beards	Best Pop Artist	Won
2014	The Beards	Best Pop Artist	Won

=== National Live Music Awards ===
The National Live Music Awards (NLMAs) are a broad recognition of Australia's diverse live industry, celebrating the success of the Australian live scene. The awards commenced in 2016.

Year	Nominee / work	Award	Result
2016	Johann Beardraven (The Beards)	Live Instrumentalist of the Year	Won
