= Space They Cannot Touch =

Single by Kate Miller-Heidke

from the album Little Eve
- A-side: "Space They Cannot Touch"
- Released: 22 March 2008
- Genre: Pop
- Length: 4:07
- Label: Sony BMG
- Songwriter: Keir Nuttall

Kate Miller-Heidke singles chronology
"Make It Last" (2007)	"Space They Cannot Touch" (2008)	"Can't Shake It" (2008)

"Space They Cannot Touch" is a song by Australian singer songwriter Kate Miller-Heidke. The song was released in March 2008 as the third and final single from Miller-Heidke's debut album Little Eve.

== Song history ==
"Space They Cannot Touch" is a love song written by Miller-Heidke's husband and collaborator Keir Nuttall. The song originally featured on Miller-Heidke debut extended play Telegram, which she released independently in 2004. It received considerable airplay on the Australian youth radio network Triple J and in November 2005, was included on EMI's Australia's summer anthology Coastal Chill 6. A free MP3 of the song was downloaded more than 20,000 times from the Triple J's website between 2005 and 2006.

Due to its popularity, Miller-Heidke re-recorded it for inclusion on her major-label debut album Little Eve and it was released as the album's third single. A live performance from her Live at the Chapel show was used as the music video. The song was featured on the short film Left Unspoken directed by Avi Lewin which was screened at Tropfest 2009.

== Music video ==
No music video was shot, instead the performance of the song at The Chapel was used.

== Track listing ==
Digital EP

1. Space They Cannot Touch
2. Little Adam - (Live at The Chapel)
3. Dreams (I Love You) - (Live at The Chapel)
