= O Vertigo! =

- Album artwork for O Vertigo!

Studio album by Kate Miller-Heidke
- Released: 14 March 2014
- Recorded: October–November 2013 at The Shed Studios in Canterbury, Melbourne
- Genres: Pop, rock
- Length: 47:19
- Label: Cooking Vinyl
- Producer: John Castle

Kate Miller-Heidke chronology
Nightflight (2012)	O Vertigo! (2014)	The Rabbits (2016)

Singles from O Vertigo!
- 1. "Drama" Released: 14 February 2014; 2. "Sing to Me" Released: 25 July 2014; 3. "Offer It Up" Released: 8 September 2014

O Vertigo! is the fourth studio album by Australian singer-songwriter Kate Miller-Heidke. The album was released on 14 March 2014 and peaked at number 4 on the ARIA Charts.

At the ARIA Music Awards of 2014, the album was nominated for Best Adult Contemporary Album but lost to Neil Finn & Paul Kelly's Goin' Your Way.

== Background ==
After Miller-Heidke released three albums on Sony Music, she decided to leave the record company. She described the record company as a "corporate juggernaut". She explained in an interview that she didn't like the team she had and she felt like she needed to be in total control. To create her fourth album, Miller-Heidke used Pledge Music. Pledge Music uses crowdfunding by providing fans with items that would elsewhere be unavailable. For example, Miller-Heidke's Pledge Music page featured items such as being on the guest list of every one of Kate Miller-Heidke's concert or having Miller-Heidke call you on your birthday. Miller-Heidke's Pledge Funding venture was highly successful with Miller-Heidke breaking crowd-funding records. As of 4 February 2014, Miller-Heidke has received 209% of her set goal. With every purchase on her Pledge Music page, fans receive a download of the album on the release date as well as an exclusive live album recorded on her Heavenly Sounds tour, which includes several live versions of tracks on the album. With every purchase, Miller-Heidke stated that a portion would go to protecting the Great Barrier Reef. O Vertigo! is the fastest selling crowd funded project in Australian history.

Miller-Heidke recorded the album from October to November 2013 with producer/engineer John Castle and mixer Cenzo Townshend in Melbourne. After recording the album, Miller-Heidke signed a distribution deal with independent label Cooking Vinyl to release the album in Australia, Europe, and Asia. Miller-Heidke self-released the album in North America.

== Releases ==
The single, "Drama", was released in February 2014 as the first single from O Vertigo!. It was written by Keir Nuttall and features vocals from Australian hip-hop artist Drapht. The second single, "Sing to Me" was released in July 2014.

The third single, "Offer It Up", was released in Germany in July 2014. The song received a physical release in the UK to promote her album and tour in September 2014. New Reviews said that her vocals were "gentle and delicious", and worked well with the subtle beat. In 2014, a lyric video appeared on Miller-Heidke's YouTube channel. It is very basic, featuring the lyrics in white on a black background and white flashes of light to swap between slides. As of 27 January 2019, the video has over 30,000 views.

== Critical reception ==
O Vertigo! was well received by Australian online and print music commentators. Most reviews recognised that it was a successful musical statement taking Kate Miller-Heidke in a new direction.

The Cairns Post's Jacqueline Le described the album as a "fitting description of the 32-year-old's musical journey." themusic.com.au's Daniel Cribb praised the album, saying "Anyone who pledged to the Oh, Vertigo! crowd-funding campaign can rest assured that their money was put to good use as, with a clear headspace and support from fans, Miller-Heidke has found a healthy blend of the quirky elements of 2008's Curiouser and more serious nature of 2012's Nightflight."

Other reviews stated: "It's a stunning collection that demonstrates exactly why she's one of our most exciting musicians." "O Vertigo! delivers everything we have come to expect from a Kate Miller-Heidke album: impressive vocals, unique style and a willingness to push the musical boundaries to create a fun and quirky album." "Kate Miller-Heidke is an example of true success... Kate outdid herself with this album and we cannot wait to see where she goes from here." "There are so many things to like about this record. Even if you're a little put off by the impressive but admittedly still kinda dorky soprano gymnastics, Kate Miller-Heidke has covered such an expansive surface area of the current pop landscape on O Vertigo! that without any pandering, there's something for everyone. Her flawless delivery and world-weathered yet unbreakable confidence shine on this collection with a vision that we may never have seen come to fruition at Sony. She took a big risk, but O Vertigo! is in itself the even bigger reward she richly deserves."

== Track listing ==
No.	Title	Length
1.	"Offer It Up"	3:45
2.	"Yours Was The Body"	3:22
3.	"O Vertigo!"	3:16
4.	"Share Your Air" (featuring Passenger)	3:35
5.	"Rock This Baby to Sleep"	3:10
6.	"Jimmy"	3:30
7.	"What Was I to You?"	3:38
8.	"Sing To Me"	3:37
9.	"Drama" (featuring Drapht)	2:44
10.	"Lose My Shit"	4:12
11.	"Ghost" (featuring Megan Washington)	3:37
12.	"Bliss"	3:59
13.	"I'm Jealous" (live)	4:54

== Charts ==
Chart (2014)	Peak position
Australian Albums (ARIA)	4

== Release history ==
Country	Release date	Format	Label	Catalogue
Australia	14 March 2014	CD, Digital Download, LP	Cooking Vinyl	CVCD010, CVLP010
