= Kate Miller-Heidke =

Australian singer and songwriter (born 1981)

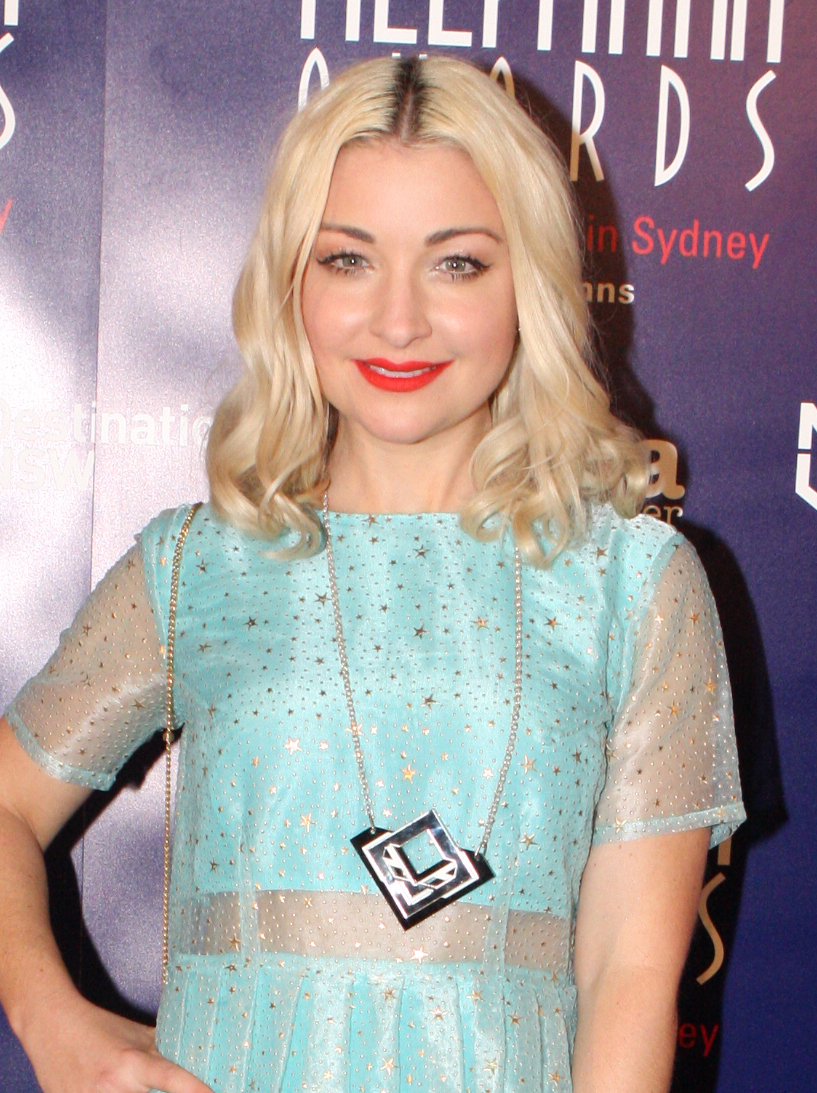
- Miller-Heidke in 2015
- Born: Kate Melina Miller-Heidke; 16 November 1981 (age 45); Gladstone, Queensland, Australia
- Education: Queensland Conservatorium of Music, BMus; Queensland University of Technology (MMus); Griffith University (honorary doctorate)
- Occupations: Singer; songwriter; playwright; television personality; actor
- Years active: 1998–present
- Spouse: Keir Nuttall (m. 2007)
- Children: 1
- Musical career
- Origin: Brisbane, Queensland, Australia
- Genres: Folk; pop; rock; country; country rock; alternative; opera
- Instruments: Vocals, piano
- Labels: Waterbear/Sony BMG; Epic US; RCA UK; Cooking Vinyl Australia
- Formerly of: Elsewhere; Fatty Gets a Stylist
- Website: katemillerheidke.com

Kate Melina Miller-Heidke (/ˈhaɪdki/ HYDE-kee; born 16 November 1981) is an Australian singer and songwriter. Although classically trained, she has generally followed a career in alternative pop music. She signed to Sony Australia, Epic in the US and RCA in the UK, but since 2014 has been an independent artist. Four of her solo studio albums have peaked in the top 10 of the ARIA Albums Chart, Curiouser (October 2008), Nightflight (April 2012), O Vertigo! (March 2014) and Child in Reverse (October 2020). Her most popular single, "The Last Day on Earth" (July 2009), reached No. 3 on the ARIA Singles Chart after being used in promos for TV soap, Neighbours, earlier in that year. At the ARIA Music Awards, Miller-Heidke has been nominated 17 times.

She represented Australia in the Eurovision Song Contest 2019 in Tel Aviv, Israel, with her song, "Zero Gravity" (January 2019). Miller-Heidke is the only person to have sung at Coachella, the New York Metropolitan Opera, and Eurovision. She has won five Helpmann Awards.

== Early life ==
Kate Melina Miller-Heidke was born on 16 November 1981 in Gladstone, Queensland. Her mother, Jenny Miller, was a ballet dancer and then a dance teacher and her father, Greg Heidke, is a high school principal. After her parents separated, she was raised between Indooroopilly with her mother and Auchenflower with her father; she has two siblings. One of her cousins, Annie Lee, portrays Mourne Kransky in the comedy trio, the Kransky Sisters.

For secondary education Miller-Heidke attended Kelvin Grove State College (two years), Brigidine College, Indooroopilly (one year) prior to graduating from St Aidan's Anglican Girls' School (two years) in 1998. She completed a Bachelor of Music degree in Classical Voice from the Queensland Conservatorium of Music at Griffith University on full scholarship, followed by a Master of Music degree at Queensland University of Technology.

== Career ==
=== 2000–2005: Career beginnings, Elsewhere, and solo EPs ===
As a classical singer, she has won awards: Elizabeth Muir Prize (2000), Donald Penman Prize (2001), Linda Edith Allen Memorial Prize (2002) and Horace Keats Prize (2002). Her conservatorium performances were in Orpheus in the Underworld (2000), Venus and Adonis (2002) and The Pilgrim's Progress (2002). As an Opera Queensland Developing Artist, Miller-Heidke has performed as an understudy in productions, Sweeney Todd, Don Pasquale and Un ballo in maschera. In July 2005 she made her solo professional operatic debut with Opera Queensland in the role of Flora in Britten's The Turn of the Screw.

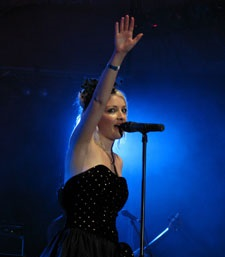
At the Woodford Folk Festival, December 2008. She had been named Queen of the Festival back in 2002–2003.

Miller-Heidke, while a tertiary student, from 2000 played in several Brisbane alternative pop bands. She was lead singer and songwriter with acoustic pop/folk band Elsewhere, which formed in 2000, and released a self-titled extended play of original songs before breaking up in 2003. She briefly played keyboards in Pete Murray's backing band, and started her solo career in 2003.

She performed at an annual event, Women in Voice, three times: in 2002, 2004 and 2005, where she shared the stage with Pearly Black, Margret RoadKnight, Jenny Morris and Chrissy Amphlett. Miller-Heidke became known in Brisbane from these performances and her 2005 appearance in Women in Voice 14 won her the Helpmann Award for Best Performance in an Australian Contemporary Concert. John Shand of The Sydney Morning Herald felt, "The young [Miller-Heidke] raised the bar with a witty rendition of David Byrne's 'Psycho Killer', part Peter Sellers and part mock-opera."

In June 2004 Miller-Heidke independently recorded and distributed her first EP, Telegram; from its seven tracks, five were written or co-written by her and two by her then-boyfriend, Keir Nuttall. Nuttall is the founding mainstay lead guitarist and vocalist in Brisbane-based progressive rock band Transport, which formed in 2001. Nuttall and fellow Transport members have also worked as part of Miller-Heidke's backing band since 2004. In 2005 she released a second EP with four tracks, Comikaze, however only 500 copies were made. It was later referred to as an "aborted comedy CD." In 2007 she explained that it was a "big mistake and promptly stopped pressing them."

Miller-Heidke was preparing to sing the role of Mabel in Gilbert and Sullivan's Pirates of Penzance with Opera Australia in late 2005. Instead she turned from classical to pop music when "Space They Cannot Touch", a track from Telegram, became a hit on Australia's national youth radio network, Triple J and was named by station presenter Richard Kingsmill as his "pick of the week" in September. Radio support led to increased national attention for her music: not only did she gain thousands of fans, she signed with EMI Music Australia, obtained her first talent manager, Leanne de Souza, and her first agent, Dorry Kartabani, at the Harbour Agency. She then began touring Australia with her band.

As well as touring Australia she appeared at festivals in Woodford – where she was named Queen of the Woodford Folk Festival in 2002–2003 – and in Port Fairy and Blue Mountains. She was a guest panellist on TV shows, RocKwiz, Spicks and Specks and Q&A. She has performed on ABC TV's The Sideshow and Q&A, on Network Ten's Rove and Good News Week, Seven Network's Sunrise and The Morning Show, and on live broadcasts of the ARIA Music Awards.

=== 2006–2007: Circular Breathing and Little Eve ===
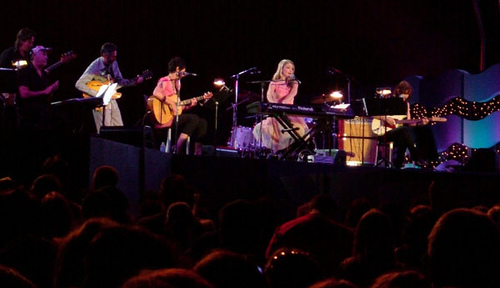
Miller-Heidke (centre) singing alongside Deborah Conway (on acoustic guitar at left) and Mia Dyson, Australia Day Live, January 2007. All three had performed as part of the Broad Festival in August 2006.

Miller-Heidke was invited by Australian singer-songwriter Deborah Conway to take part in the 2006 Broad Festival project during August, with three other Australian female artists, they performed their own and each other's songs. Joining Miller-Heidke and Conway were Melinda Schneider, Mia Dyson and Ella Hooper.

Miller-Heidke released her third EP, Circular Breathing with six tracks, in May 2006 via Waterbear Records/Sony BMG. For the EP she provided vocals, piano and wurlitzer, with Nuttall on guitars, Emma Dean on violin and vocals, Steve Pope on drums and percussion, Scott Saunders on bass guitar, and John Turnbull provided a whistling cameo in "Jamie". Pope and Saunders are Nuttall's bandmates from Transport. Eleven Magazine's reviewer rated it at four-and-a-half stars and explained, "It's very boppy and very light and carefree. The lyrics are a bit lacking, a bit like diary of a teenager kind of thing. Though, the acoustic element of the album, particularly the strong piano use holds it together." The album provided a single, "Apartment", also in 2006.

She followed with her debut album, Little Eve, on 26 May 2007. It was produced by Magoo (Regurgitator, Not from There, Gerling) at Black Box Studios, Brisbane. Aside from herself and members of Transport, Miller-Heidke used strings by Zhivago String Quartet and Danielle Bentley, a choir/chorus of seven singers, and additional session musicians. It peaked at No. 11 on the ARIA Albums Chart and was certified gold in 2008 by ARIA for shipment of 35,000 copies. Australian musicologist, Ian McFarlane, felt it, "drew comparisons with Kate Bush and Tori Amos or 'like Nina Hagen, just with a much better voice'." AllMusic's Jody Macgregor gave it four-out-of-five stars and observed, "When she uses her deceptively gigantic voice to sing about these little lives, Miller-Heidke achieves something that goes above and beyond the simple pleasures of pop music – a genuine profoundness."

Its lead single, "Words", released in the same month, reached the top 50 on the related ARIA Singles Chart. ARIA's Ian Wallace observed, "Although traces of her operatic style are recognisable in her songs, [she] has since decided to shy away from the opera circuit and make a dash for the pop scene." At the ARIA Music Awards of 2007 she received five nominations, Best Female Artist, Best Pop Release, Breakthrough Artist – Album for Little Eve and Producer of the Year for Magoo's work on Little Eve, and Breakthrough Artist – Single for "Words". A re-recorded version of "Space They Cannot Touch" (originally on Telegram) was issued in March of the following year as her third single from Little Eve.

=== 2008–2010: Curiouser and mainstream success ===
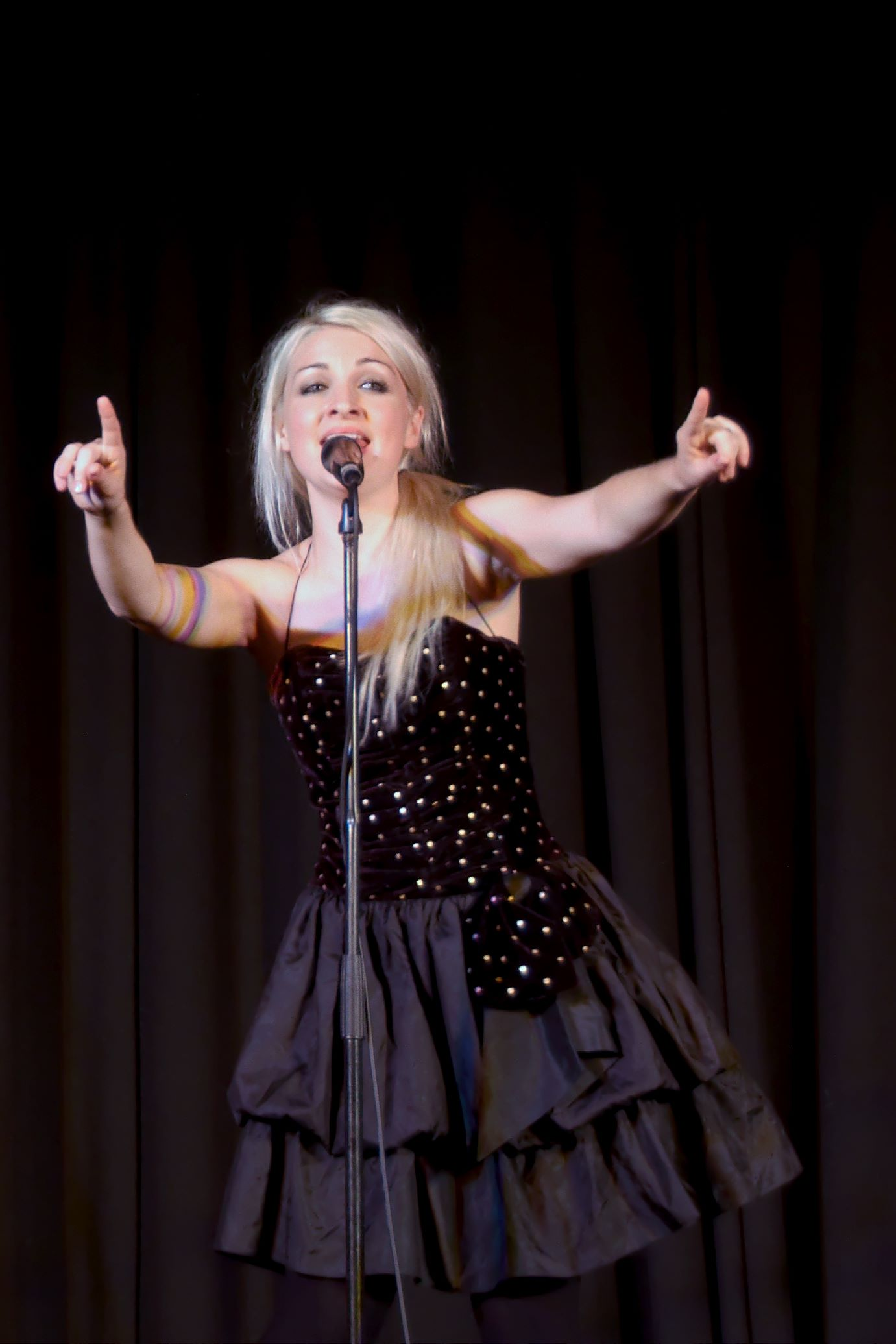
Performing at the Brunswick Music Festival, March 2009

Miller-Heidke's second album, Curiouser, was released on 18 October 2008, which was recorded in Los Angeles, she worked with co-producers Nuttall and Mickey Petralia (Beck, Flight of the Conchords). The tracks were mostly written during a two-month period with creative collaborator and now-husband, Nuttall. The album's lead single, "Can't Shake It" debuted on the ARIA Singles Chart at No. 38 in October 2008, making it her first top 40 song. Curiouser was her first top 10 album: peaking at No. 2. McFarlane called it her "major breakthrough." In April 2009 Miller-Heidke returned to operatic works and won critical acclaim for her performance as Baby Jane in Jerry Springer: The Opera at the Sydney Opera House.

Miller-Heidke and Nuttall co-wrote "Caught in the Crowd", which was issued as the album's second single in February 2009 and peaked at No. 33 on the ARIA singles charts in June. They were awarded the $US25,000 grand prize in the 2008 International Songwriting Competition for its composition. They were the first Australians to win the grand prize. It was used by Australian secondary schools for anti-bullying programs. "Caught in the Crowd" was re-released in November and was accredited as a gold single in 2010.

Her following single, "The Last Day on Earth" (July 2008), reached No. 3 in Australia, her first top 10 hit. It had been used in promos for TV soap opera, Neighbours. Due to that single's popularity, Curiouser re-entered the top 50 in August 2008; it also reached No. 1 on iTunes for three weeks. The track later peaked at No. 1 on the ARIA Australian Artist Singles Chart. "The Last Day on Earth" and Curiouser were both certified platinum by ARIA for shipment of 70000 units. Curiouser gained critical praise in the United States: Sasha Frere-Jones from The New Yorker, wrote "I got lucky last week and found a gem in the pile; Curiouser. If your favourite American pop star is coming across slightly washed out, you will want to hear Miller-Heidke. Curiouser is a big clutch of pantone swatches."

At the ARIA Music Awards of 2009 in November, the Miller-Heidke performed and was also nominated four more times, Single of the Year for "The Last Day on Earth", Best Video for "The Last Day on Earth" (directed by Mark Alston) and Best Female Artist and Best Pop Release for Curiouser. She toured throughout the US, United Kingdom and continental Europe as support act for Ben Folds. Folds explained, "she's one of those people that actually does deserve to be called a unique talent." She released her first music DVD, Live in San Francisco (October 2010). "The Last Day on Earth" received another nomination, for Most Popular Australian Single, in the newly installed public-voted categories at the ARIA Music Awards of 2010. Through 2010 to 2011, Miller-Heidke played at international festivals, Coachella, Lilith Fair, Rifflandia, Byron Bay Bluesfest, Southbound and Peats Ridge Festival. She also featured on UK singer Passenger's album Flight of the Crow (2010).

=== 2011–2013: Fatty Gets a Stylist and Nightflight ===
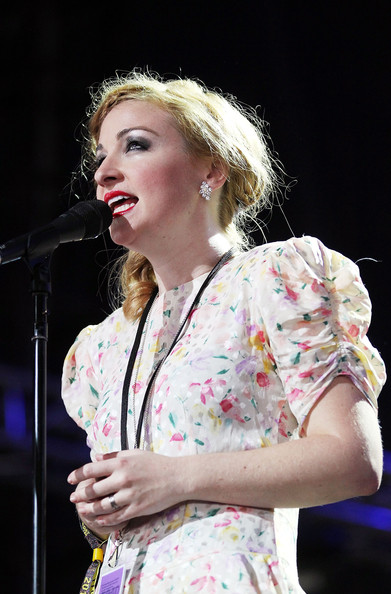
Kate Miller-Heidke in 2011

On 24 June 2011 Miller-Heidke's side project, Fatty Gets a Stylist, released a self-titled album. She had formed the project as a short-term, alternative pop duo with Nuttall. The album was written and recorded on a lap top over several months, with Nuttall producing, in different locations in Australia, South East Asia and West London. It reached No. 90 on the ARIA Albums Chart. Its second single, "Are You Ready?" (June), was used in a New York Lottery ad on US TV and in promo for the Seven Network's shows, in which actors from various shows mime to the words while walking, ending with Alf Stewart from Home and Away yelling the final line, "Let's go!". Fatty Gets a Stylist, was credited to Miller-Heidke as her third solo album, Liberty Bell, outside Australia.

When English opera director, Tom Morris, saw Miller-Heidke in the role of Baby Jane back in 2009, he had asked her to audition for his production of John Adams' opera The Death of Klinghoffer for the English National Opera (ENO) at the London Coliseum. Following two months' rehearsals, she sang the role of British Dancing Girl for a two-week run in early 2012. She performed the role again at the Metropolitan Opera in New York in October 2014.

On 13 April 2012 Miller-Heidke's third Australian studio album, Nightflight, was released. It had been recorded at two studios in Melbourne and another in London: Nuttall co-producing with Lindsay Gravina (Jebediah, the Living End, Thirsty Merc). AllMusic's Ned Raggett gave it three-and-a-half stars and declaimed, "[it] doesn't surprise so much as reinvigorate, with [her] working of sometimes familiar tropes turning into one strong song after another. Caught somewhere between cleanly energetic rock, piano-led moments, and [her] sometimes swirled vocals, the result is a remarkably enjoyable melange." Rave Magazine's Josh Donellan observed, "It's still built on catchy pop hooks and melodies and will undoubtedly find itself at home on a few commercial radio stations, but the songs on this album also reveal a darker side to her songwriting."

Nightflight peaked at No. 2 – equal highest chart position with Curiouser – and provided three singles, "I'll Change Your Mind" (April 2012), "Sarah" (February 2013) and "Ride This Feeling" (July 2013). However, none of the singles reached the top 50. At the ARIA Music Awards of 2012 she was nominated for two more public-voted categories: Best Video for "I'll Change Your Mind" (co-directed by Miller-Heidke and Darcy Prendergast) and Best Australian Live Act for her tours in support of the album and related singles. "Ride this Feeling" was selected as the promotional theme for the "Visit Brisbane" TV ad campaign in 2013 by Brisbane Marketing as part of the Brisbane City Council's Economic Development Board.

=== 2013–2019: O Vertigo! and Muriel's Wedding ===
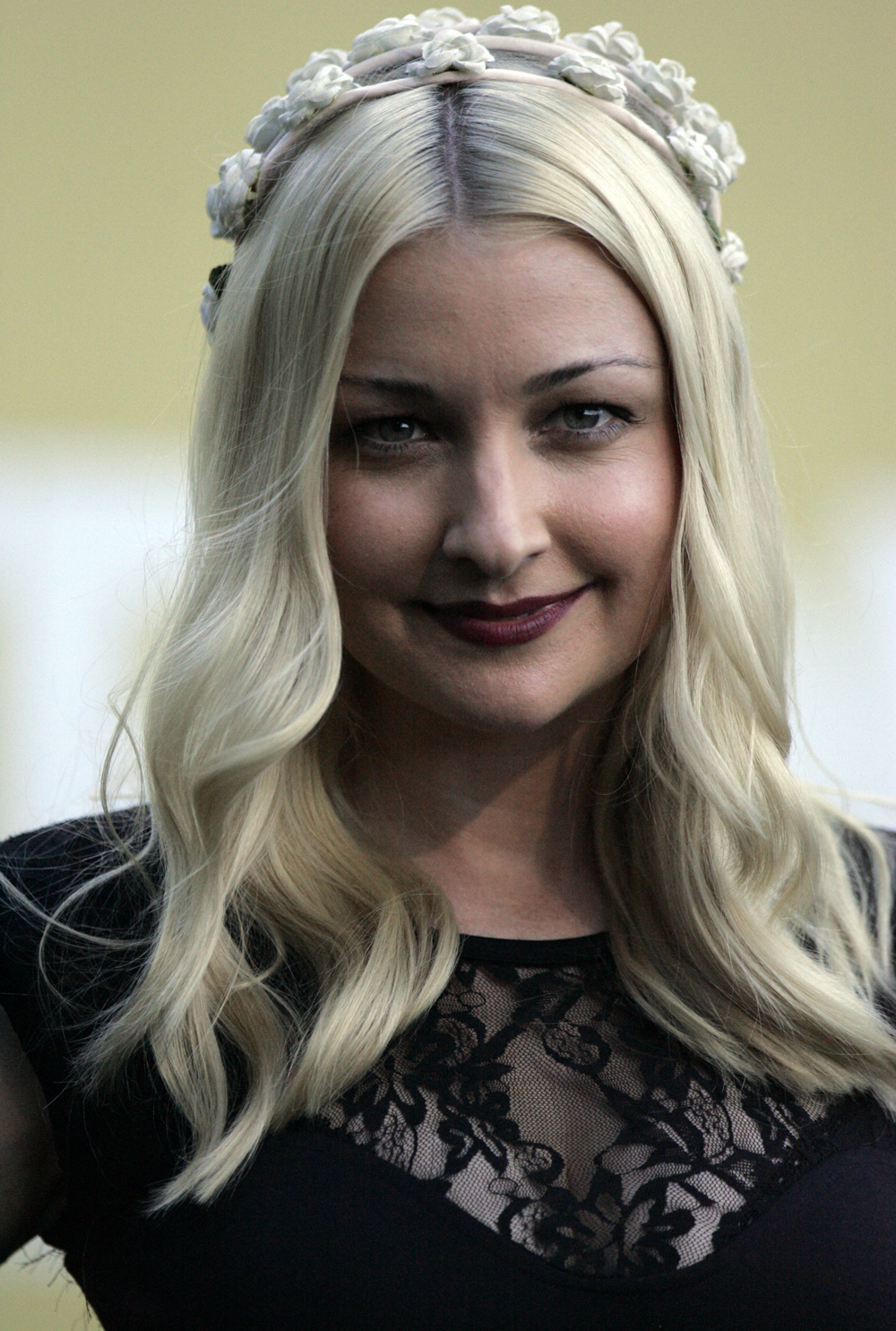
Kate Miller-Heidke in 2013

Miller-Heidke sang the screen-role of Amber in the world premiere of Michel van der Aa's opera Sunken Garden for the ENO in April 2013. In September Miller-Heidke left Sony Records, which she described as a "corporate juggernaut". She started work on her fourth Australian studio album, O Vertigo! (14 March 2014), and sought crowd-funding via PledgeMusic to record it independently, as well as donations for the protection of the Great Barrier Reef. She broke the record on Pledge for the fastest target achievement: in three days the album was paid for and donations for the reef continued. O Vertigo! was produced by John Castle for Cooking Vinyl Australia and reached No. 4 on the ARIA Albums Chart. It was also nominated for the ARIA Award for Best Adult Contemporary Album in 2014.

Miller-Heidke was co-commissioned by Lyndon Terracini of Opera Australia in late 2014 to write an opera, The Rabbits, based on John Marsden's children's novel of that name, to be performed in 2015. The Rabbits was premiered at the Perth Festival in February 2015, to critical acclaim. At the Helpmann Awards of 2015 she won two more categories for The Rabbits: Best New Australian Work (shared with co-writers Lally Katz and Iain Grandage) and Best Original Score (shared with co-composer Grandage).

She took on the role of "female protagonist" in van der Aa's interactive song cycle film, The Book of Sand (June 2015), based on the short story of the same name from 1975, by Argentine writer Jorge Luis Borges. In November 2015, she issued a non-album single, "I'm Growing a Beard Downstairs for Christmas", featuring comedy rock group, the Beards. The charity single was used to raise funds for bowel cancer research. She also debuted as a TV actress in the Australian Broadcasting Corporation (ABC) comedy opera miniseries, The Divorce (December) in the role of Caroline. She also sings on the related soundtrack album, The Divorce: Original Cast Recording. At the 2016 ARIA Music Awards she was nominated for Best Original Soundtrack, Cast or Show Album with The Rabbits: Original Live Cast Recording (April 2016) and Best Comedy Release for "I'm Growing a Beard Downstairs for Christmas" (shared with the Beards).

In August 2017 a live album, Live at the Sydney Opera House, was issued by Kate Miller-Heidke and the Sydney Symphony Orchestra. She received two more ARIA nominations in 2017: Best Classical Album for the album and Engineer of the Year for Bob Scott's work. Miller-Heidke and Nuttall co-wrote new music and lyrics for the musical theatre version of Muriel's Wedding, which was directed by Simon Phillips and adapted from the 1994 comedy-drama film of the same name – both written by P. J. Hogan. It premiered at the Roslyn Packer Theatre Walsh Bay, Sydney by the Sydney Theatre Company and ran from 6 November 2017 to 28 January 2018.

A documentary, Making Muriel, including interviews with Miller-Heidke and Nuttall, was broadcast by ABC TV in late November 2017. At the Helpmann Awards of 2018 she won Best Original Score (shared with Nuttall) and was nominated for Best New Work (shared with Nuttall and Hogan) for work on Muriel's Wedding. During 2019 the musical toured to Melbourne, Sydney and Brisbane. Miller-Heidke and Nuttall also co-wrote the music for Phillips' 2018 production of Twelfth Night for the Melbourne Theatre Company where they were performed by Colin Hay. At the ARIA Music Awards of 2018 Miller-Heidke sang alongside Missy Higgins and Amy Sheppard on their rendition of "Not Pretty Enough" in honour of that year's ARIA Hall of Fame inductee, Kasey Chambers.

=== 2019–2024: Eurovision Song Contest and Child in Reverse ===
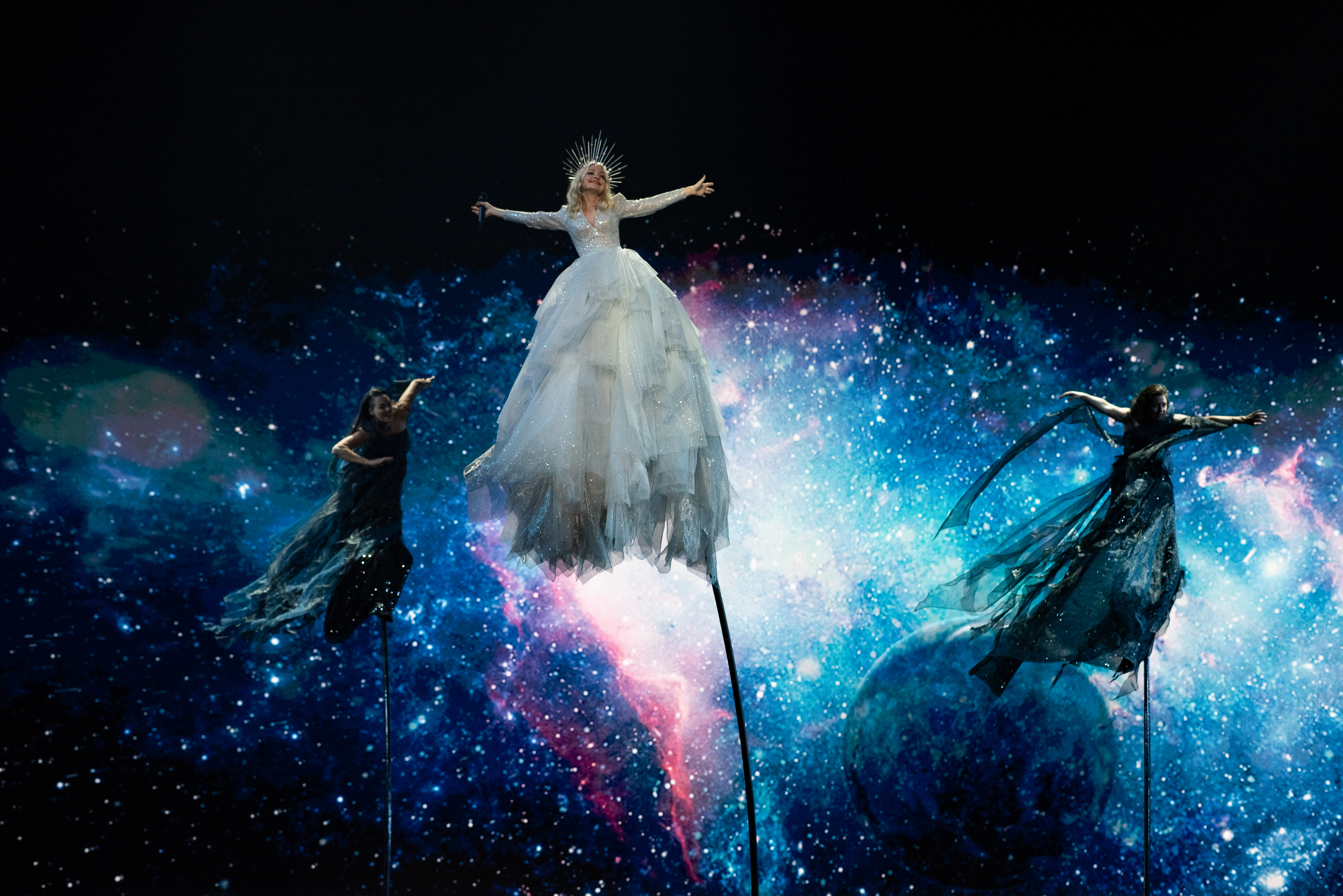
Miller-Heidke (centre) performing "Zero Gravity" during the first semi-final of the Eurovision Song Contest 2019 in Tel Aviv, Israel. She won the semi-final and finished ninth in the final.

In early 2019 Miller-Heidke was one of ten candidates to represent Australia in the Eurovision Song Contest 2019 with "Zero Gravity" at Eurovision – Australia Decides. The track was co-written by Miller-Heidke, Nuttall and Julian Hamilton and was short-listed for the APRA Song of the Year of 2020. She won the Australian candidacy in February for the Eurovision Song Contest 2019 in Tel Aviv, Israel. She was joined onstage by Israeli backing singers. "Zero Gravity" won the first semi-final, before placing ninth in the grand final in May with 284 points. Miller-Heidke received the Marcel Bezençon award in the Artistic category, given to the best artist as voted on by the commentators of the contest.

In October 2020 Miller-Heidke released her fifth studio album, Child in Reverse, which peaked at No. 9. It was recorded and produced in Melbourne by Evan Klar for EMI Records. The Music AU's Guido Farnell, observed, "eleven nuggets of finely crafted pop tunes that are soft, dreamy and impossibly silky smooth whilst moving to compulsive grooves". Staff writers for scenstr.com.au, noticed that the tracks were "sculpted into 3 and 4-minute shots of love and fear, memory and empathy, rage and redemption". In the same year she participated in The Masked Singer Australia as the "Queen" and was the runner-up on the second season of the show.

Miller-Heidke appeared in episode 2 of the 2021 ABC TV comedy show Preppers as herself and a fantasy character, the Penrith panther, singing her song, "I Am My Own Panther Now". She and Nuttall collaborated again in 2021 with the Melbourne Theatre Company and Simon Phillips, writing music for their production of Shakespeare's As You Like It. The couple composed in collaboration with Connor D'Netto the monodrama The Call for Opera Queensland and Brisbane Festival 2022, featuring soprano Ali McGregor. Miller-Heidke and Nuttall composed the music for the 2022 television series Darby and Joan. They wrote the musical comedy Bananaland, directed by Phillips, for the 2023 Brisbane Festival. Miller-Heidke sang the national anthem before the 2023 AFL Grand Final and appeared in the half-time show.

In February 2024, Seven Network announced that Miller-Heidke would be joining the thirteenth season of the singing competition show The Voice Australia as a coach, replacing Jessica Mauboy. The season premiered in August 2024, and she features alongside returning coach Guy Sebastian and fellow new coaches Adam Lambert and LeAnn Rimes. She returned as a coach in 2025 for the fourteenth season with Melanie C, Ronan Keating, and Richard Marx. Miller-Heidke ultimately coached the winner of the season, Alyssa Delpopolo. Miller-Heidke performed along tenor Rosario La Spina and soprano Rachelle Durkin at Opera Queensland's 2024 Festival of Outback Opera in Winton, singing Vivaldi's motet In furore iustissimae irae, arias from her opera The Rabbits, and her "Zero Gravity".

=== 2025–present: The Kiss and The Abyss ===
In June 2026, Miller-Heidke announced the release of The Kiss and the Abyss for August 2026. According to a press release, the album finds Miller-Heidke "returning to her folk influences while also embracing darker textures and playing with theatrical storytelling".

== Band ==
On stage and in the studio Miller-Heidke was backed by members of Brisbane-based rock band Transport from 2003: Nuttall on lead guitar and backing vocals, Scott Saunders on bass guitar and Steve Pope on drums. Her backing band initially also included multi-instrumentalist and singer, Emma Dean, who left in 2006 to pursue a solo career. Dean was replaced by Sallie Campbell on keyboard and vocals. Early in 2008 Campbell left to focus on her own band, Speed of Purple, and Nicole Brophy joined on guitar and vocals.

From April to June 2007 while Transport were working in the US and UK, Miller-Heidke's touring band was Campbell joined by Mark Angel on guitar, Ben McCarthy on bass guitar and backing vocals and Joachim Alfheim on drums. Both Angel and Alfheim went on to play for Kristy London & the Other Halves. McCarthy stayed with Miller-Heidke until 2008. On the 2010 US tour she was supported by Nuttall only. The 2011 line-up was Nuttall, Brophy, Pope joined by Nathan Moore on bass guitar and backing vocals. Brophy and Moore both left in the following year and were replaced by Madeleine Page and James O'Brien, respectively. Her 2012 tour of the US and Canada for the North American release of Nightflight included only Dan Parsons and Madeleine Paige. Dates in support of Ben Folds included only Nuttall.

== Personal life ==
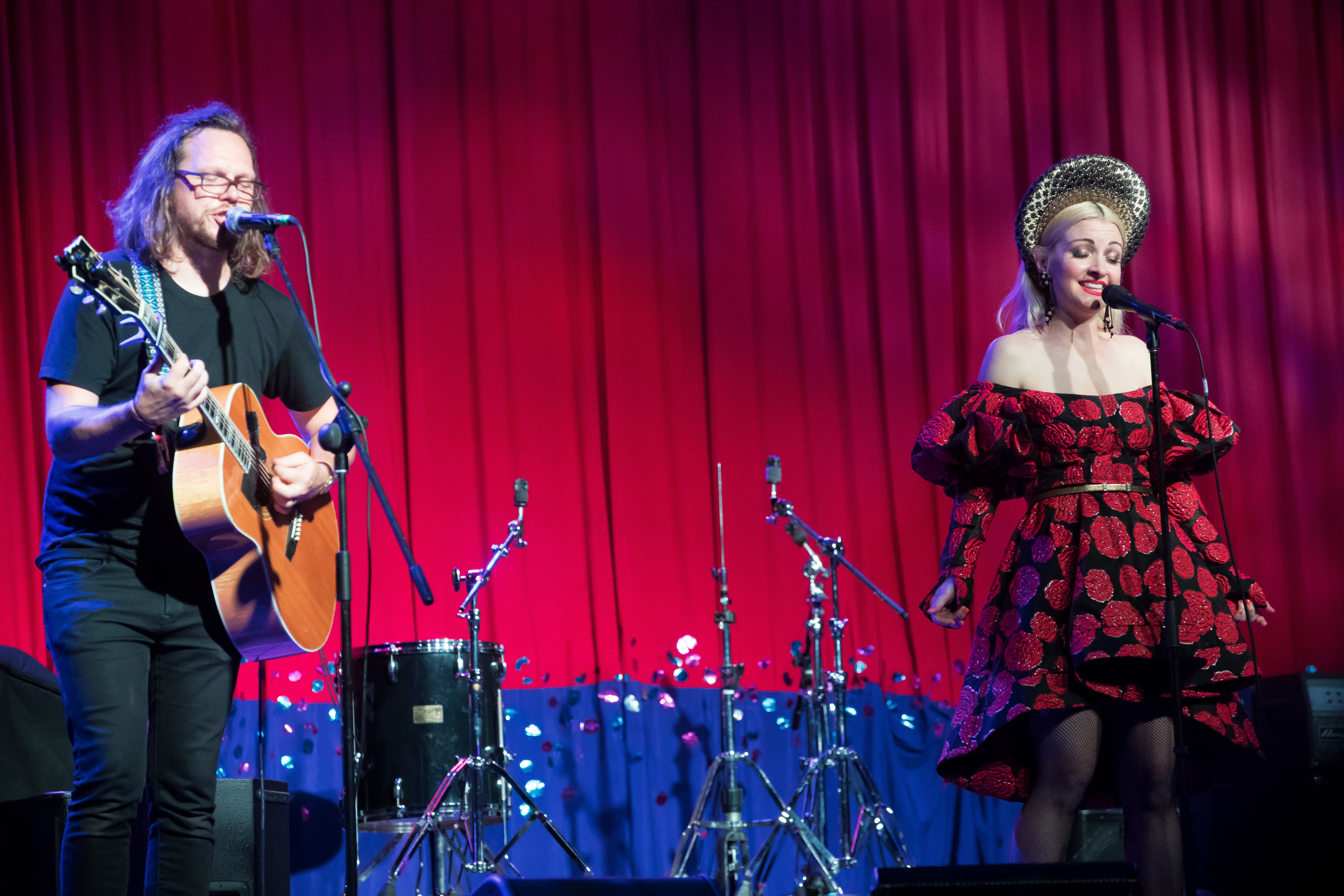
Miller-Heidke (right) singing alongside her husband, Keir Nuttall on guitar and vocals, Blue Mountain Music Festival, Katoomba, March 2018

Miller-Heidke, as a member of a group, took part in an unplugged band competition at Toowong's Regatta Hotel, which lost against a fellow Brisbane-based group. She started dating the other group's lead singer and guitarist, Keir Nuttall, in the early 2000s while both attended Queensland Conservatorium of Music. Nuttall and his group, Transport, became part of her backing band by 2003. Nuttall has also collaborated in songwriting, side projects and as a record producer. The couple married in November 2007, and in 2016 they had their first child. They live in Melbourne.

== Discography ==
Albums

- Little Eve (2007)
- Curiouser (2008)
- Nightflight (2012)
- O Vertigo! (2014)
- Child in Reverse (2020)
- The Kiss and the Abyss (2026)

== Filmography ==
=== Film ===
Year	Title	Role	Notes
2015	The Book of Sand	Woman	Interactive film
2018	Ladies in Black	Nightclub Singer	Cameo

=== Television ===
Year	Title	Role	Notes
2015	The Divorce	Caroline	Miniseries, main role
2016	Play School	Herself	Guest presenter, 1 episode
2019	Australian Story	Herself	Documentary series, 1 episode
2020	The Masked Singer	Queen	Celebrity singing contest
2021	Preppers	Herself/Penrith Panther	2 episodes
2023	Bluey	Chili's Mum	Episode: "Dragon"
2024–present	The Voice	Herself: Main judge	Season 13–present

== Stage credits ==
Year	Title	Role	Notes
2009	Jerry Springer: The Opera	Baby Jane	Sydney Opera House
2012–14	The Death of Klinghoffer	British Dancing Girl	English National Opera, Metropolitan Opera
2013	Sunken Garden	Amber	English National Opera
2015–16	The Rabbits	Songbird	Also composer; Helpmann Award for Best New Australian Work (with Lally Katz and Iain Grandage); Helpmann Award for Best Original Score (with Iain Grandage)
2017–19	Muriel's Wedding	—N/a	Composer, Helpmann Award for Best Original Score (with Keir Nuttall)
2023–24	Bananaland	—N/a	Composer (with Keir Nuttall)

== Awards and nominations ==
=== AIR Awards ===
The Australian Independent Record Awards (commonly known informally as AIR Awards) is an annual awards night to recognise, promote and celebrate the success of Australia's Independent Music sector.

Year	Nominee / work	Award	Result
2018	Live at the Sydney Opera House	Best Independent Classical Album	Nominated

=== APRA Music Awards ===
The APRA Awards are held in Australia and New Zealand by the Australasian Performing Right Association to recognise songwriting skills, sales and airplay performance by its members annually.

Year	Nominee / work	Award	Result	Ref.
2009	"Can't Shake It" (with Keir Nuttall)	Song of the Year	Nominated	
2010	"The Last Day on Earth" (with Keir Nuttall)	Song of the Year	Nominated	
2010	"Caught in the Crowd" (with Keir Nuttall)	Song of the Year	Shortlisted	
2020	"Zero Gravity" (Kate Miller-Heidke, Julian Hamilton, Keir Nuttal)	Song of the Year	Shortlisted	
2021	"The Worst Block in Town" (with Keir Nuttall)	Best Music for an Advertisement	Nominated	
2022	"I Am My Own Panther Now" (from Preppers) (with Keir Nuttall)	Best Original Song Composed for the Screen	Nominated	
2023	"The Call" (Connor D'Netto [composer], Miller-Heidke and Nuttall [librettists])	Art Music Awards Work of the Year: Dramatic	Nominated	

=== ARIA Music Awards ===
The ARIA Music Awards is an annual awards ceremony that recognises excellence, innovation, and achievement across all genres of Australian music. Miller-Heidke has been nominated 18 times.

Year	Nominee / work	Award	Result
2007	Little Eve	Best Female Artist	Nominated
2007	Little Eve	Best Pop Release	Nominated
2007	Little Eve	Breakthrough Artist – Album	Nominated
2007	Magoo for Little Eve	Producer of the Year	Nominated
2007	"Words"	Breakthrough Artist – Single	Nominated
2009	"The Last Day on Earth"	Single of the Year	Nominated
2009	Mark Alston for "The Last Day on Earth"	Best Video	Nominated
2009	Curiouser	Best Female Artist	Nominated
2009	Curiouser	Best Pop Release	Nominated
2010	"The Last Day on Earth"	Most Popular Australian Single	Nominated
2012	Nightflight tour	Best Australian Live Act	Nominated
2012	Miller-Heidke, Darcy Prendergast for "I'll Change Your Mind"	Best Video	Nominated
2014	O Vertigo!	Best Adult Contemporary Album	Nominated
2016	The Rabbits	Best Original Soundtrack, Cast or Show Album	Nominated
2016	"I'm Growing a Beard Downstairs for Christmas"	Best Comedy Release	Nominated
2017	Live at the Sydney Opera House	Best Classical Album	Nominated
2017	Bob Scott for Live at the Sydney Opera House	Engineer of the Year	Nominated
2021	Tony Espie for Child in Reverse	Engineer of the Year	Nominated

=== Australian Women in Music Awards ===
The Australian Women in Music Awards is an annual event that celebrates outstanding women in the Australian Music Industry who have made significant and lasting contributions in their chosen field. They commenced in 2018.

Year	Nominee / work	Award	Result
2025	Kate Miller-Heidke	Artistic Excellence Award	Nominated

=== EG Awards/Music Victoria Awards ===
The Music Victoria Awards (previously known as The Age EG Awards and The Age Music Victoria Awards) are an annual awards night celebrating Victorian music.

Year	Nominee / work	Award	Result
2009	herself	Best Female Artist	Won
2012	Kate Miller-Heidke	Best Female	Nominated

=== Helpmann Awards ===
The Helpmann Awards are accolades for live entertainment and performing arts in Australia, presented by industry group Live Performance Australia. Established in 2001, the annual awards recognise achievements in the disciplines of musical theatre, contemporary music, comedy, opera, classical music, theatre, dance and physical theatre.

Year	Nominee / work	Award	Result
2005	Women in Voice 14	Best Performance in an Australian Contemporary Concert	Won
2015	The Rabbits	Best New Australian Work (with Lally Katz and Iain Grandage)	Won
2015	The Rabbits	Best Original Score (with Iain Grandage)	Won
2016	MOFO 2016 Kate Miller-Heidke and the Tasmanian Symphony Orchestra with visuals by Amy Gebhardt	Best Australian Contemporary Concert	Won
2018	Muriel's Wedding	Best Original Score (with Keir Nuttall)	Won
2018	Muriel's Wedding	Best New Australian Work (with Nuttall and P. J. Hogan)	Nominated
2019	Twelfth Night (with Keir Nuttall)	Best Original Score	Nominated

=== J Awards ===
The J Awards are an annual series of Australian music awards that were established by the Australian Broadcasting Corporation's youth-focused radio station Triple J. They commenced in 2005.

Year	Nominee / work	Award	Result
2014	herself	Double J Artist of the Year	Nominated

=== Queensland Music Awards ===
The Queensland Music Awards (previously known as Q Song Awards) are annual awards celebrating Queensland, Australia's brightest emerging artists and established legends. They commenced in 2006.

Year	Nominee / work	Award	Result (wins only)
2006	"Apartment"	Pop Song of the Year	Won
2011	herself	Export Achievement Award	awarded
2011	herself	The Courier-Mail People's Choice Award Most Popular Female	Won
2012	herself	The Courier-Mail People's Choice Award Most Popular Female	Won

=== Other awards ===
Year	Event	Award	Result
2009	International Songwriting Competition	Grand Prize (with Keir Nuttall) ("Caught in the Crowd")	Won
2018	Sydney Theatre Awards	Best New Australian Work (with Keir Nuttall and PJ Hogan)	Nominated
2018	Sydney Theatre Awards	Best Original Score of a Mainstage Production (with Keir Nuttall)	Won
2019	Marcel Bezençon Awards	Artistic Award	Won

Awards and achievements
Preceded by Jessica Mauboy with "We Got Love"	Australia in the Eurovision Song Contest; 2019	Succeeded by Montaigne with "Don't Break Me"
