= Keir Nuttall =

Australian musician

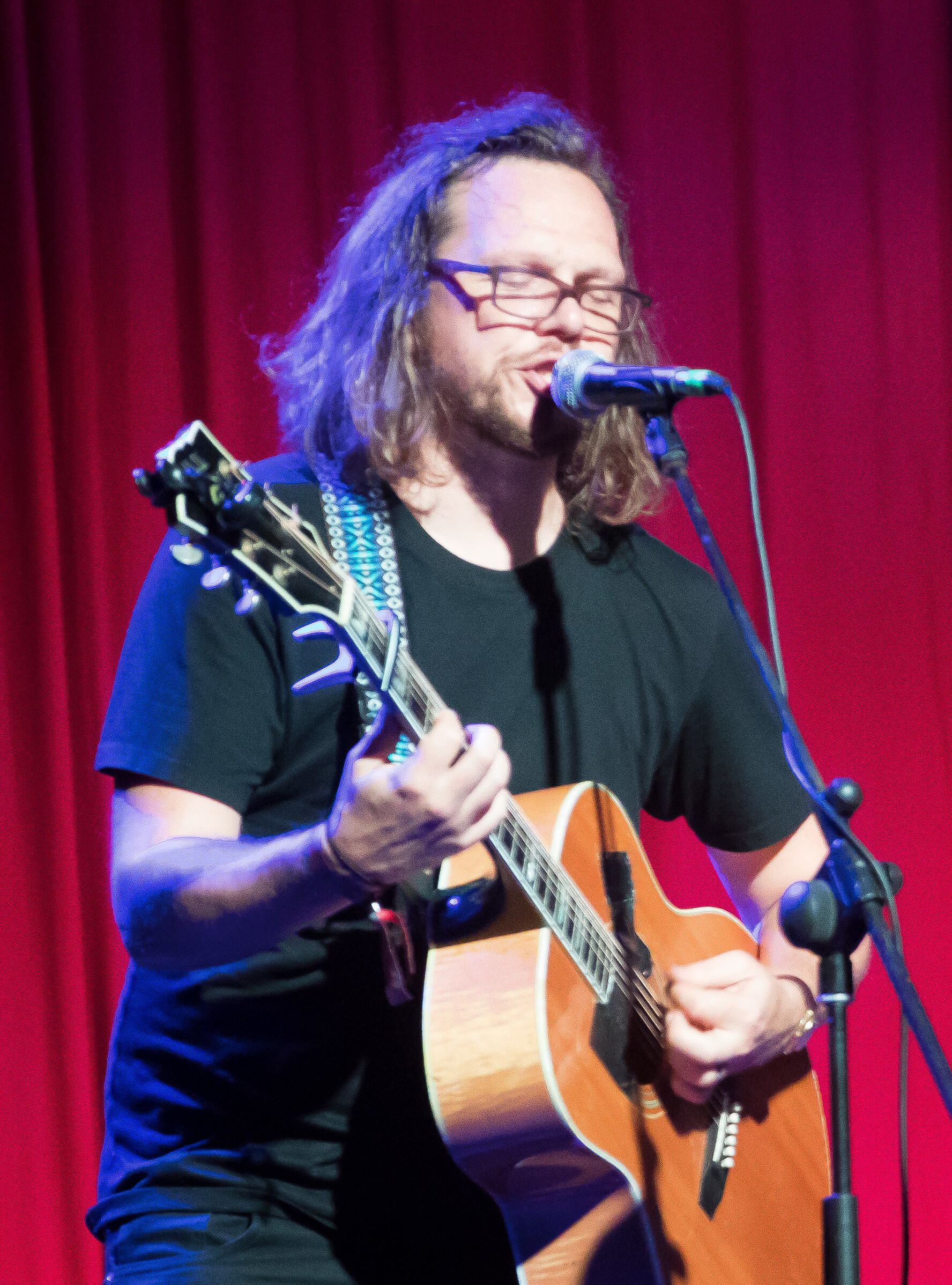
- Nuttall in 2018

Background information
- Also known as: Franky Walnut
- Born: Keir Francis Nuttall; 1974 (age 51–52)
- Origin: Toowoomba, Queensland, Australia
- Genre: Pop, rock, comedy
- Occupation: Musician
- Instruments: Vocals; guitar
- Years active: ca. 1995–present
- Formerly of: Transport; Fatty Gets a Stylist
- Website: keirnuttall.com

Keir Francis Nuttall (born 1974) is a Brisbane-based guitarist and singer-songwriter. He was a founding member of the rock trio Transport, which was active between 2001 and 2007. Since 2004 he has performed and recorded in the backing band of his then-partner (now wife), Kate Miller-Heidke. Nuttall has co-written many of Miller-Heidke's singles, including "Space They Cannot Touch" and "Words". As Franky Walnut, Nuttall performs satirical comedy rock songs. His first solo album, The Franky Walnut Reflective Drink Coaster (2013), was nominated for the ARIA Award for Best Comedy Release in 2014.

== Biography ==
Keir Francis Nuttall, was born in 1974, and raised in Toowoomba by Lyn, a primary school teacher, and Robyn Nuttall. He attended Toowoomba Grammar School before studying at the Queensland Conservatorium of Music in 2001. Nuttall played in a number of Brisbane bands, including Complicated Game, experimental rock-funk trio More (formed in Toowoomba with Phil Lepherd and Lachlan Stewart), industrial metallers Dogmachine, and 1980s covers band Space Invaders. In 2001 he formed Transport, on lead guitar and vocals, as a progressive rock band with fellow conservatorium students, Steve Pope on drums and Scott Saunders on bass guitar and vocals.

Nuttall has written songs recorded by his then-girlfriend (now wife), Kate Miller-Heidke, since 2004. His written work include her single, "Space They Cannot Touch" (March 2008), which first appeared on her debut extended play, Telegram, in July 2004. With his band mates from Transport, Nuttall is also a member of her backing band. Another composition for his now-wife, "Words" (May 2007) was nominated for ARIA Award for Breakthrough Artist – Single in 2007. Nuttall and Miller-Heidke collaborated on all tracks on her second album, Curiouser (October 2008). In May 2009 the pair were awarded the Grand Prize of $US25,000 in the 2008 International Songwriting Competition for their composition, "Caught in the Crowd". It was released as the second single from Curiouser, in February 2009, which peaked in the ARIA Singles Chart top 40.

As Franky Walnut, during Miller-Heidke concerts, Nuttall performs comic songs such as, "Where Have I Been All Your Life?" and "Three Word Review", both of which he recorded. His first solo album, The Franky Walnut Reflective Drink Coaster (2013), was nominated for the ARIA Award for Best Comedy Release in 2014. The pair formed a side-project, Fatty Gets a Stylist, and issued a self-titled album in June 2011, which reached the ARIA Albums Chart top 100. Internationally it was re-titled as Liberty Bell.

Together with Miller-Heidke, he co-wrote the score and additional songs for the stage musical version of Muriel's Wedding. It premiered to positive reviews in Sydney, in November 2017 and continued in its run to late January of the following year. In 2019, "Zero Gravity," a song co-written by Nuttall and Miller-Heidke with Julian Hamilton, was selected to represent Australia at the 2019 Eurovision Song Contest in Tel Aviv, Israel. It was performed by Miller-Heidke, where it reached the final and finished in ninth place.

== Personal life ==
Nuttall took part in an unplugged band competition at Toowong's Regatta Hotel and won against a fellow Brisbane group. Nuttall started dating that group's lead singer, Kate Miller-Heidke, while both attended Queensland Conservatorium of Music. The couple married in November 2007, and in 2016 the couple had their first child.

== Discography ==
=== Albums ===
List of albums
Title	Album details
The Franky Walnut Reflective Drink Coaster (as Franky Walnut)	Released: 2013; Label: One Louder Recordings (TAP012); Formats: CD, download

== Awards and nominations ==
=== ARIA Music Awards ===
The ARIA Music Awards are a set of annual ceremonies presented by Australian Recording Industry Association (ARIA), which recognise excellence, innovation, and achievement across all genres of the music of Australia. They commenced in 1987.

Year	Nominee / work	Award	Result	Ref.
2014	The Franky Walnut Reflective Drink Coaster	Best Comedy Release	Nominated	

=== Helpmann Awards ===
The Helpmann Awards is an awards show, celebrating live entertainment and performing arts in Australia, presented by industry group Live Performance Australia since 2001. Note: 2020 and 2021 were cancelled due to the COVID-19 pandemic.

Year	Nominee / work	Award	Result	Ref.
2018	Muriel's Wedding The Musical (with Kate Miller-Heidke)	Best Original Score	Won	
2019	Twelfth Night (with Kate Miller-Heidke)	Best Original Score	Nominated	
