= List of hip-hop groups =

This is a list of notable hip-hop groups.

== 0–9 ==
- 01099
- 1c34
- 11/5
- 112
- 113
- 116 Clique
- 12World
- 13 Block
- 150
- 187 Fac
- 187 Strassenbande
- 1Team
- 1000 Clowns
- 1200 Techniques
- 1300
- 1995
- 2 In A Room
- 2 Live Crew
- 2 Skinnee J's
- 213
- 24K
- 28 Days
- 2NE1
- 2nd II None
- 2XL
- 3Racha
- 3rd Bass
- 3X Krazy
- 41
- 415
- 4th Avenue Jones
- 4x4
- 504 Boyz
- 509-E
- 5th Ward Boyz
- 5th Ward Juvenilez
- 54th Platoon
- 5Five
- 5miinust
- 67
- 69 Boyz
- 7 Notas 7 Colores
- The 7A3
- 7L and Esoteric
- 808 Mafia
- 81355
- 814
- 8Ball & MJG
- 88Glam
- 88Rising
- 95 South
- 98s
- 99 Posse

== A ==
- A1 x J1
- A92
- A.B. Original
- A Lighter Shade of Brown
- ABN
- Above the Law
- Abyssinian Creole
- Achozen
- Acid
- Advanced Chemistry
- Afro-Rican
- Akwid
- Alaclair Ensemble
- Ali & Gipp
- The Alkaholiks
- All City
- Alles ist die Sekte
- Allfrumtha I
- The Almighty RSO
- Analog Brothers
- Anotha Level
- Another Bad Creation
- A Tribe Called Quest
- Anticon
- Antipop Consortium
- Arabian Knightz
- Archean Soundtrack
- Arkatech Beatz
- Armand Hammer
- Army of the Pharaohs
- Arrested Development
- Ärsenik
- Arsonists
- Articolo 31
- Artifacts
- ASAP Mob
- Assassin
- Asiatic Warriors
- Astronomy Class
- Atach Tatuq
- A.T.B.A.N Klann
- Atmosphere
- Ateez
- Attila
- Audio Perm
- Audio Push
- Audio Two
- The Away Team
- Axe Murder Boyz
- Ayo & Teo
- Aztlan Underground

== B ==
- B-Rock and the Bizz
- B.A.P
- Back-On
- Backburner
- Backphobic
- Balam Ajpu
- Bankroll Mafia
- Banlieuz'Art
- B.U.G. Mafia
- Bad Balance
- Bad Copy
- Bad Meets Evil
- Banks & Steelz
- Basehead
- Bass Brothers
- Beast Coast
- Beastie Boys
- The Beat Bullies
- The Beat Fleet
- Beat Junkies
- Beatnuts
- Beginner
- Bell Biv DeVoe
- Bennie K
- Beogradski Sindikat
- Big Bang
- Big Brovaz
- Big Tymers
- Bigflo & Oli
- Binary Star
- Biohazard
- Bisso Na Bisso
- Blac Monks
- Black 47
- Black Alien & Speed
- The Black Eyed Peas
- Black Hippy
- Black Market Militia
- Black Moon
- Black Noise
- Black Sheep
- Black Star
- Black Vulcanite
- Blackstreet
- Blackalicious
- Blahzay Blahzay
- Blazin' Squad
- Blimpliza
- Bliss n Eso
- Block B
- Blood of Abraham
- Bloodhound Gang
- Bloods & Crips
- Blu & Exile
- Blue Scholars
- Blue Sky Black Death
- Body Count
- Body Head Bangerz
- The Bomb Squad
- Bomb Zombies
- Bomfunk MC's
- Bone Thugs-n-Harmony
- Boo & Gotti
- Boo-Yaa T.R.I.B.E.
- Boogie Boys
- Boogie Down Productions
- Boot Camp Clik
- Boss Hogg Outlawz
- Botany Boyz
- Boy Better Know
- Boyz n da Hood
- Brainwash Projects
- Brand Nubian
- BrassMunk
- Bravehearts
- Brethren
- Broederliefde
- Brokencyde
- Brockhampton
- Brothers Grym
- Brothers Keepers
- Brothers Stoney
- Brougham
- BS 2000
- BTS
- Buckwheat Boyz
- Buk Bak
- The Bumblebeez
- Butterfingers
- BWP

== C ==
- C-Block
- C.I.A.
- Cali Agents
- Cali Swag District
- Calle 13
- Camp Lo
- Camp Mulla
- Cannibal Ox
- Capital Punishment Organization
- Capone-N-Noreaga
- Cartel
- Cartel de Santa
- Carvin & Ivan
- Cash Money Millionaires
- Casseurs Flowters
- The Cataracs
- CB Mass
- CD Rev
- Centr
- Ces Cru
- CGM
- Channel Live
- chelmico
- Child Actor
- Children of the Corn
- Chopper City Boyz
- Christian Rich
- Cidinho and Doca
- Citizen King
- City Girls
- City High
- City Morgue
- Class A'z
- The Click
- clipping.
- Clipse
- La Cliqua
- cLOUDDEAD
- Club Dogo
- Coco & Clair Clair
- Cocoa Brovaz
- Coda Conduct
- The Cold Crush Brothers
- Collapsed Lung
- Collectiv3
- Combat Wombat
- Commodore 64
- Company Flow
- Compton's Most Wanted
- Consciência Humana
- The Conscious Daughters
- Control Machete
- Cookie Crew
- Cool & Dre
- The Cool Kids
- Cor Veleno
- The Coup
- Crash Crew
- CREAM
- Crime Mob
- Crooklyn Dodgers
- The Cross Movement
- Crown City Rockers
- Cru
- Crucial Conflict
- Cubeatz
- Cunninlynguists
- Curse ov Dialect
- Custom Made
- CUZZOS
- CYNE
- Cypress Hill
- Czarface

== D ==
- The D.E.Y.
- D-Block Europe
- D.I.T.C.
- D12
- D4L
- Da-108
- Da BackWudz
- Da Band
- Da Beatminerz
- Da Bush Babees
- Da Lench Mob
- Da Weasel
- Da Youngsta's
- Dain ba Enkh
- Dälek
- DAM
- Damu Ridas
- Dance Appeal
- Dangerdoom
- The Dangerous Crew
- Darc Mind
- Dark Lotus
- Dark Polo Gang
- Darkroom Familia
- Darshan
- Das EFX
- Das Racist
- Dawn Raid All-Stars
- The Dayton Family
- DC Talk
- DCG Brothers
- De La Soul
- Dead Celebrity Status
- Dead Obies
- Dead Prez
- Deadly Venoms
- Desert Heat
- Death Grips
- Death Threat
- Debaser
- Deceptikonz
- Deep Puddle Dynamics
- Deepspace5
- Def Con Dos
- Def Jef
- Def Squad
- Def Wish Cast
- Delinquent Habits
- The Delinquents
- Deltron 3030
- Dem Franchize Boyz
- Dem Mob
- The Demigodz
- Demon Boyz
- DFC
- Diafrix
- Diddy – Dirty Money
- Die Antwoord
- Die Fantastischen Vier
- Digable Planets
- Digital Underground
- Diggin' in the Crates Crew
- Dilated Peoples
- The Diplomats
- Dirty
- Dirty Circus
- Dirty Money
- Dis-n-Dat
- Disciplinska komisija
- The Disposable Heroes of Hiphoprisy
- Divine Council
- DJ Jazzy Jeff & the Fresh Prince
- Djadja & Dinaz
- Do or Die
- Tha Dogg Pound
- Doggy's Angels
- DopeNation
- The Doppelgangaz
- Doomtree
- Dot N Pro
- Double Dee and Steinski
- The Dove Shack
- Down Low
- Downtown Science
- Downsyde
- Dr. Jeckyll & Mr. Hyde
- Dragon Ash
- Dragon Fli Empire
- Drain Gang
- Dream Warriors
- Dru Hill
- Drunken Tiger
- DTF
- DVSR
- Dubb Union
- Dubmatique
- Dynametrix
- Dynamite Deluxe
- Dynamic Duo
- Dynamic Twins

== E ==
- Earatik Statik
- EARTHGANG
- East End X Yuri
- Tha Eastsidaz
- Eiffel 65
- Epik High
- Elemental
- Elitni Odredi
- Ellipsis
- Eluphant
- eMC
- EPMD
- Eric B. & Rakim
- Ex Battalion
- The Exclusives
- Eyedea & Abilities

== F ==
- The Fab 5
- Facção Central
- Facemob
- La Familia
- Fannypack
- Far East Movement
- Farm Fresh
- Fast Crew
- Fast Life Yungstaz
- The Fat Boys
- The Fearless Four
- The Federation
- Felt
- Fémina
- Fettes Brot
- Fever 333
- Field Mob
- Fila Fresh Crew
- Finesse Cult
- Fingathing
- Fintelligens
- The Firm
- First Words
- Fischmob
- Five Deez
- Flash Bang Grenada
- Flatbush Zombies
- Flavor Unit
- Flipmode Squad
- Flipsyde
- Flobots
- Floetry
- Fly Union
- Foesum
- Fonky Family
- The Force M.D.s
- Foreign Beggars
- Foreign Exchange
- Foreign Heights
- Fort Minor
- La Fossa
- Fouradi
- Frank n Dank
- Freestyle Fellowship
- Freundeskreis
- The Frontline
- FSK Satellite
- Fu-Schnickens
- Fugees
- Full Force
- Fünf Sterne deluxe
- Funk Mobb
- Funkdoobiest
- Funkoars
- Funky Four Plus One
- Furious Five
- The Futuristiks

== G ==
- G-Unit
- Gal Level
- Gambino Family
- Gang Starr
- Gangrene
- Gangwe Mobb
- Gangstagrass
- Gatineau
- Geeks
- Gemelli Diversi
- Genetikk
- Get Busy Committee
- The Get Em Mamis
- Geto Boys
- Ghetto Commission
- Ghetto Concept
- Ghetto Mafia
- Ghetto Twiinz
- Ghost Town DJs
- Giant Panda
- Gidi Gidi Maji Maji
- Git Fresh
- Gipsy.cz
- The Goats
- The Godfathers
- Goldie Lookin' Chain
- Goodie Mob
- Goon Sqwad
- Gorillaz
- Gospel Gangstaz
- GothAngelz
- GothBoiClique
- GP Wu
- GreedMoney
- Group Home
- Grand Analog
- Grand Buffet
- Grandmaster Flash and the Furious Five
- Grandwizard Theodore & the Fantastic Five
- Gravediggaz
- Grayskul
- GRITS
- GS9
- GS Boyz
- Gully Platoon
- Gunshot
- Gym Class Heroes

== H ==
- H-Kayne
- Hadag Nahash
- Halal Gang
- Handsome Boy Modeling School
- The Hard Corps
- Hardnoise
- Harlem Spartans
- Haunted Mound
- The HBK Gang
- Heartsdales
- Heavy D & the Boyz
- Heavy Metal Kings
- Hed PE
- Heiruspecs
- Helix Tears
- Heltah Skeltah
- The Herd
- Hermitude
- Hieroglyphics
- Hifana
- The High & Mighty
- High Rule
- Higher Brothers
- Hijack
- Hilcrhyme
- Hilltop Hoods
- Hiphop Tamizha
- Hip Hop Hoodíos
- Hip Club Groove
- Hit Squad
- Ho99o9
- Home Brew
- Home Made Kazoku
- Hostyle Gospel
- Hot Boys
- Hotstylz
- House of Krazees
- House of Ladosha
- House of Pain
- Hov1
- Horrorshow
- HP Boyz
- The HRSMN
- Huncho Jack
- Hurby Azor
- HXG
- Hyjak N Torcha

== I ==
- I Smell Panties
- iKon
- IAM
- IC3PEAK
- Ice City Boyz
- Idéal J
- II Tru
- Ill Al Skratch
- Ill Blu
- Illegal
- Ill Harmonics
- Illzilla
- IMx
- Infamous Mobb
- Infinite Mass
- INI
- Injury Reserve
- Intik
- Insane Clown Posse
- L'Institut
- Insane Poetry
- Intelligent Hoodlum
- Invisibl Skratch Piklz
- Islamic Force
- Island Boys
- Ison & Fille

== J ==
- JJ Doom
- J J Fad
- J.U.S.T.I.C.E. League
- Jaa9 & OnklP
- JackBoys
- Jackson Jackson
- Jagged Edge
- Jazzy Five
- Jedi Mind Tricks
- The Jet Age of Tomorrow
- Jet Life
- Jewelxxet
- Joey Valence & Brae
- JóiPé & Króli
- Juggaknots
- Juice Crew
- JuJu Mob
- Jungle Brothers
- Junior M.A.F.I.A.
- Jurassic 5
- Just D
- Justice & Kaos
- Justus League
- JVC Force

== K ==
- K-South
- K.I.Z
- Kaliber 44
- Kalin and Myles
- Kane and Abel
- Kartellen
- Kasta
- The Kaze
- Keelay and Zaire
- Ketsumeishi
- Kick the Can Crew
- Kid British
- Kid 'n Play
- Kids See Ghosts
- Kids These Days
- Kidz in the Hall
- Kill the Vultures
- Killarmy
- King Giddra
- Kinto Sol
- Kirpichi
- The KLF
- KMD
- Kneecap
- The Knux
- Kolchose
- Kookies N Kream
- Koolism
- Kottonmouth Kings
- KREC
- Krept and Konan
- Krovostok
- The Krown Rulers
- Kris Kross
- Komora
- Kwanza Unit

== L ==
- L'entourage
- L'Trimm
- The L.O.X.
- La Coka Nostra
- LA Symphony
- Lab Waste
- Labyrint
- Larsiny Family
- The Last Kinection
- The Latin Kings
- Latin Mafia
- Latyrx
- Laze & Royal
- Lazy Mutha Fucka
- LBC Crew
- Leaders of the New School
- Legendury Beatz
- Les Twins
- Lgeez
- Lifers Group
- Lifesavas
- A Lighter Shade of Brown
- Lil Soldiers
- Limp Bizkit
- Linkin Park
- Liricas Analas
- Lisp
- Little Brother
- Little-T and One Track Mike
- Live Squad
- Living Legends
- LNDN DRGS
- Lo-Key?
- Local Knowledge
- Loco Locass
- London Posse
- The Lonely Island
- Looptroop
- Lootpack
- Lord Tariq and Peter Gunz
- Lords of the Underground
- Lordz of Brooklyn
- Los Tres Mosqueteros
- The Lost Boyz
- The Lost Children of Babylon
- Low Profile
- Low Pros
- The Lox
- LSDRadio
- Lucas and Marcus
- Lumberjacks
- Lumino
- Lunatic
- Luniz

== M ==
- M-Flo
- M.O.P.
- ¡Mayday!
- Machas With Attitude
- Made Men
- MadGibbs
- Madvillain
- Mafia K-1 Fry
- Main Attrakionz
- Main Source
- Majid Jordan
- Major Figgas
- Maktub
- Malchishnik
- Manau
- Mansionz
- Mantronix
- Mars Ill
- Marxman
- Massive Töne
- Masta Ace Incorporated
- Masters of Illusion
- MBS
- MC-Hár
- MCND
- Me N Ma Girls
- Me Phi Me
- Mecate
- The Medicine Men
- Medina
- The Meeting Tree
- MellemFingaMuzik
- MellowHigh
- MellowHype
- Members Only
- Menace Clan
- Menajahtwa
- Metabass'n'Breath
- Metro Zu
- Tha Mexakinz
- MHz Legacy
- Migos
- Mighty Big Crime
- Milwaukee Banks
- Mind over Matter
- Ministère AMER
- Mnemonic Ascent
- Mnogotochie
- Mo Thugs
- Mob Figaz
- Mob Style
- Mobb Deep
- Molemen
- Molotov Movement
- Monsta Island Czars
- Monsta X
- Mood
- Moorish Delta 7
- Moosh and Twist
- The Mossie
- Mount Westmore
- Mountain Brothers
- Mullage
- Muph & Plutonic
- Murat & Jose
- Muzion
- MVP
- My Crazy Girlfriend

== N ==
- N.Flying
- N2Deep
- N Dubz
- N.E.R.D
- N.W.A
- Nappy Roots
- Natas
- Nationwide Rip Ridaz
- Native Deen
- Native Ryme Syndicate
- Native Tongues
- Naughty by Nature
- NB Ridaz
- NCT
- NCT 127
- NCT Dream
- NCT U
- Necessary Noize
- Nefew
- NehruvianDoom
- The Neptunes
- Nesian Mystik
- New African Poets
- New Boyz
- New Breed
- Newcleus
- Next
- Nice & Smooth
- Niggaz on tha Run
- Nina Sky
- No Good
- No Money Enterprise
- No Wyld
- nobodyknows+
- Non Phixion
- Non-Prophets
- The Nonce
- The Northern Boys
- Northern State
- Northstar
- Novagang
- NSG
- Les Nubians
- Nuuk Posse
- NxWorries

== O ==
- Ø Way
- O.C. Dawgs
- O.F.T.B.
- O.G.C.
- O.G. Style
- Oaktown's 3.5.7
- Odd Future
- Oddjobs
- OFB
- Ojivolta
- The Opus
- Omnikrom
- @onefive
- Onefour
- One Day
- Only the Family
- Onyx
- Optimus Rhyme
- Organized Konfusion
- Organized Rhyme
- Orelha Negra
- Orishas
- Osdorp Posse
- OuterSpace
- The Outhere Brothers
- OutKast
- Outlawz
- Outsidaz
- Overdoz
- Overweight Pooch
- Oxide & Neutrino
- Oxymorrons

== P ==
- P$C
- P-Square
- P-Unit
- P.A.
- P.M. Dawn
- Pac Div
- The Pack
- Paktofonika
- Panacea
- Paraziţii
- Paris Texas
- Partners-N-Crime
- Party Fun Action Committee
- Penthouse Players Clique
- People Under The Stairs
- The Perceptionists
- Pescozada
- Pete & Bas
- Pete Philly and Perquisite
- Pete Rock & CL Smooth
- The Pharcyde
- Phi Life Cypher
- Phony Ppl
- Pigeon Hole
- Pimp-A-Lot
- Pivot Gang
- Planet Giza
- Planet Hemp
- Plastic Little
- Playaz Circle
- PNL
- Podočnjaci
- Poetic Hustla'z
- Poison Clan
- Pokahontaz
- Polyrhythm Addicts
- Poor Righteous Teachers
- Postolar Tripper
- Potluck
- Pretty Loud
- Pretty Ricky
- Prime Boys
- Prime Suspects
- Princess Superstar
- Pro Era
- The Procussions
- Project Blowed
- Proper Dos
- Prophets of Da City
- Prophets of Rage
- Proton
- Proyecto Uno
- PSO Thug
- Psy 4 de la Rime
- Psycho Realm
- Psychopathic Rydas
- PTP
- Public Enemy
- Purple City Productions
- Purple Ribbon All-Stars
- El Pus

== Q ==
- Q-York
- Quad City DJ's
- Quo

== R ==
- R2Bees
- R.A.C.L.A.
- Racionais MC's
- Radio Radio
- Rae Sremmurd
- Rage Against the Machine
- Raggasonic
- Raider Klan
- The Randy Watson Experience
- Raspberry Cordial
- Rapstar
- Raptori
- Rascalz
- Ratking
- Raw Fusion
- RBL Posse
- Reaching Quiet
- Rebel Diaz
- Redhead Kingpin and the F.B.I.
- Refugee Camp All-Stars
- The Regime
- The Rej3ctz
- Remi
- Reptilian Club Boyz
- Resin Dogs
- Reyes del Bajo Mundo
- RGP
- Rhymester
- Rhythm Power
- Rich Kidz
- Rich White Ladies
- Rip Slyme
- Rizzle Kicks
- RMG
- Road Dawgs
- Rob Base and DJ E-Z Rock
- Rock City
- Rodelheim Hartreim Projekt
- Rodney-O & Joe Cooley
- Roll Deep
- The Roots
- Rottin Razkals
- Royal Fam
- The Rubberbandits
- Ruff Ryders
- Ruhrpott AG
- Run the Jewels
- Run-D.M.C.
- Rusangano Family
- Rusty Ps
- Ruthless Rap Assassins

== S ==
- Sages Poètes de la Rue
- Saïan Supa Crew
- Salt-N-Pepa
- Samoe Bolshoe Prostoe Chislo
- Sans Pression
- Savemoney
- Scapegoat Wax
- Scha Dara Parr
- Scred Connexion
- Screwball
- Screwed Up Click
- Secteur Ä
- Seedhe Maut
- Seed of 6ix
- Semi.Official
- Sens Unik
- Seshollowaterboyz
- The Sequence
- Seventeen
- Sexion d'Assaut
- Shabak Samech
- Shabazz Palaces
- Shakkazombie
- Shape Shifters
- Shayfeen
- She Rockers
- Shed Theory
- Shin Sekaï
- Shop Boyz
- Shoreline Mafia
- Show Dem Camp
- Showbiz and A.G.
- Shtar
- Shtar Academy
- SHY & DRS
- Siah and Yeshua DapoED
- Silibil N' Brains
- Silk Sonic
- Silibil N' Brains
- Skatterman & Snug Brim
- Skengdo x AM
- The Skinny Boys
- Skull Gang
- Skwatta Kamp
- Slaughterhouse
- SlayWorld
- Slum Village
- Smashproof
- Smoke Boys
- Smokin' Suckaz wit Logic
- Smif N’ Wessun
- Smilez & Southstar
- Sniper
- Snowgoons
- SOB x RBE
- Social Club Misfits
- Social Deviantz
- Solillaquists of Sound
- Sonic Sum
- The S.O.S. Band
- Soopa Villainz
- Soul Militia
- Soul Assassins
- Soul Scream
- Soul'd Out
- Soul-Junk
- Soulive
- Souls of Mischief
- Sound M.O.B.
- The Sound Providers
- Sound Unlimited
- Source of Labor
- South Central Cartel
- South West Syndicate
- Space Invadas
- Spezializtz
- Spillage Village
- Spit Syndicate
- Spontania
- Spooks
- Sporty Thievz
- St. Lunatics
- Starflam
- State Property
- Steady & Co.
- Steady Mobb'n
- StepTeam
- Stieber Twins
- Stereo MCs
- Stetsasonic
- Stik n Move
- Stonefunkers
- Strange Fruit Project
- Stray Kids
- Street Academics
- Street Warriors
- Strong Arm Steady
- Styles of Beyond
- Success-n-Effect
- The Sugarhill Gang
- $uicideboy$
- Sunz of Man
- Supersci
- Supreeme
- Suprême NTM
- Surf Gang
- Surf MC's
- Suspekt
- Sweatshop Union
- Sweet Sensation
- Swet Shop Boys
- Swollen Members
- SXTN

== T ==
- 't Hof van Commerce
- Tag Team
- Tasha & Tracie
- Task Force
- Taurus
- TBTBT
- The Team
- Tebi Rex
- Teargas
- Teriyaki Boyz
- Terror Squad
- Tha Alkaholiks
- Tha Blue Herb
- Tha Dogg Pound
- Tha Mexakinz
- The Dey
- Themselves
- Theodore Unit
- Thestand4rd
- Thizz Entertainment
- Three 6 Mafia
- Three Times Dope
- Thug Life
- Thundamentals
- Timbaland & Magoo
- Timeflies
- Tiro de Gracia
- TLC
- TLF
- TNGHT
- Too Many T's
- Too Much Trouble
- Totally Insane
- Trackmasters
- Tram 11
- Travis Porter
- Treacherous Three
- Trends of Culture
- A Tribe Called Quest
- Tribo da Periferia
- Trillionaire$
- Trillville
- Triple C's
- TRU
- True 2 Life Music
- Trybesmen
- TTC
- Tuff Crew
- Twenty One Pilots
- Twin Hype
- Twinz
- Twisted Brown Trucker
- Twiztid
- Two-9
- TwoVm Para Cristo
- Typical Cats
- TZU

== U ==
- UFO Yepha
- UGK
- Ugly Duckling
- Ugly Leaders
- Ultramagnetic MCs
- The U.M.C.'s
- U.N.
- The Underachievers
- U.N.L.V.
- Unc & Phew
- Unlogic Skill
- Uptown
- Us3
- U.S.D.A
- UTFO
- UTP
- U-N-I

== V ==
- Violadores del Verso
- Vistoso Bosses
- The Visionaries
- Vulgarnyj toNN

== W ==
- Warp 9
- Wax Murdaraz
- WayV
- WC and the Maad Circle
- We Are Toonz
- Weapons of Mass Creation
- The Weathermen
- Wee Papa Girl Rappers
- Westside Connection
- Wet Bed Gang
- Who See
- Whodini
- The Whooliganz
- Why?
- The Wilcannia Mob
- The Wild Pair
- Winnipeg's Most
- Wisemen
- WitchGang
- Wizard Sleeve
- Working on Dying
- World Class Wreckin' Cru
- The World's Famous Supreme Team
- Wreckx-n-Effect
- WSTRN
- Wu-Tang Clan
- Wu-Elements
- Wu-Syndicate

== X ==
- X & Hell
- X-Clan
- The X-Ecutioners
- X Plastaz
- XG
- Xscape

== Y ==
- Ya-kyim
- Yaggfu Front
- Y'all So Stupid
- YBN
- YG'z
- Yin Ts'ang
- Ying Yang Twins
- Yo Majesty
- Yomo & Maulkie
- Young Black Teenagers
- YoungBloodZ
- Young Fathers
- Young Gunz
- Young Soldierz
- Young Stunners
- Young T & Bugsey
- Yung Warriors

== Z ==
- Zay Hilfigerrr & Zayion McCall
- Zebrahead
- zedbazi
- Zion I
- Zone 2
- Zucchini Drive

== See also ==
- List of hip-hop musicians
