= El Jeffrey =

- Born: José Gabriel Severino; 1 April 1974 (age 52); Santiago de los Caballeros, Dominican Republic
- Genre: Merengue
- Occupations: Musician, singer-songwriter
- Instrument: Vocals
- Years active: 1987–present

José Gabriel Severino (born 1 April 1974), better known by his stage name El Jeffrey, is a merengue artist from the Dominican Republic. A major album of his is "Mi Vida". El Jeffrey first became a household name with the 80's merengue group La Artillería.

== Musical career ==
With about 35 years of musical career, he is one of the most transcendent merengueros in the Dominican Republic. El Jeffrey first became a household name with the 80's merengue group La Artilleria along with Nelson Gil, Joan Minaya and "La Rubia" Jaqueline. With La Artilleria he recorded the major hits "Soy yo" and "Otra noche." His song "Palabritas" entered the Billboard Tropical Airplay chart at # 33 in 2006.

In 2019, he performed his first Christian song with Luigui López, with the musical production of Josué Guzmán. In an interview with Alofoke Radio Show, Santiago Matías asked him about the scar on his forehead, so he explained what happened, which, he says, was something supernatural. In 2021, he released "Que pena", with which he announced that he was preparing his musical album entitled "Mi Regreso".

== Discography ==
- Por Qué Te Siento Aquí (1994)
1. Potpurrí
2. Mi Hijo
3. En Tu Pelo
4. Ven a Mi Mesa
5. Niña
6. Esta Locura
7. Sin Ti
8. Por Tu Boca
9. Lágrimas de Sangre
10. Dejar de Llorar
- Jeffrey para el Mundo (1998)
1. Un Mal Necesario
2. Mi Mundo Está Vacío
3. Quieres Ser Mi Amante
4. Estoy Muy Solo
5. Y por Tanto
6. Yo de Aquí No Me Voy
7. No Lastimes Más
8. Abrázame
9. Mujer Infiel
10. Me Muero por Eso
- Mi Tierra (2004)
1. Mi Tierra
2. Pobre Diablo
3. Debo Hacerlo
4. La Noche
5. La Mamila
6. Cuando Seas Mía
7. Cuéntale a Él
8. Ni el Odio Ni la Mentira
9. Sé que Fallé
10. Mala Pata
11. Palabritas
12. Se Me Va la Vida
13. Quiéreme
- No Te Puedo Perdonar (2004)
1. Luisa María
2. Te Veo Venir Soledad
3. No Te Puedo Perdonar
4. Nunca Voy an Olvidarte
5. Ajena
6. Se Me Va la Vida
7. No Dices Nada
8. Usted Se Me Llevó la Vida
9. Falso Amor
10. Eso Eres Tú
- Mi Vida (2005)
1. Mi Vida
2. Cada Quien Su Camino
3. O Me Quieres o Me Dejas
4. Mi Quisqueya
5. El Cigarillo
6. Jeffrey Acabó Con To'
7. Morir de Amor
8. Ay la Gente
9. Esta Es la Primera Vez
10. Ni el Odio Ni la Mentira
11. Si Yo Me Vuelvo a Enamorar
12. Sufriendo de a Duro
13. La Mujer Que Nos Gusta (feat. Johnny Ventura)
14. Tu Secreto (feat. Papi Sánchez)
15. Romántico
16. Si Yo Me Vuelvo a Enamorar (Balada)
- Yo Soy Merengue (2011)
1. Dos Locos Amantes
2. Excúseme el Pedido
3. Pedazo de Cartón
4. Insensible a Ti
5. Mujeres
6. Loco de Amor
7. Por Amor
8. Búscate un Hombre
9. No Te Puedo Perdonar
10. Niña Marisol
11. Él No Te Ama
12. Voy a Ser Grande
13. Ayer y Hoy
14. Por Amor (feat. Rafael Solano y Niní Cáffaro) (Balada)
