= Por Amor =

Por Amor may refer to:

== TV ==
- Por amor (1987 TV series), Argentine telenovela
- Por Amor (1997 TV series), Brazilian telenovela
- Por amor (2006 TV series), Colombian telenovela
- Por amor (Mexican TV series), Mexican telenovela
- Por amor a Gloria (2005), Colombian telenovela
- Por amor a vos (2008), Argentine TV programme
- Por tu amor (1999), Mexican telenovela

== Music ==
=== Albums ===
- Por Amor (Menudo album), 1982
- Por Amor (Ricardo Arjona album), 2003
- Por Amor, Plácido Domingo,1998

=== Songs ===
- "Por amor" (Rafael Solano song), 1968
- "Por amor" (Thalía song), 1998
- "Por amor", from Memorias 1976
