= Algerian hip-hop =

Music genre

Algerian hip hop music (Arabic: الراب الجزائري, romanized: Alrāb al-Jazāʼirī) as a genre includes the Hip Hop music of both native Algerians and Algerians abroad. Algerians living abroad have contributed much to this genre, especially in France, where they are also considered part of the French hip hop scene. Some of these Algerians have become prominent. Algeria also has a hip hop scene, which, while less well-known internationally, is among the most developed in Africa and the Arab world.

Algerian rap is said to have begun in the 80s. Takfarinas and Farid Ghaya Dual created the song Afen Imime in 1983. Cheb Hamidou wrote the song Jawla Fi Lil in 1985. However, many consider the first group of rappers in Algeria to be Intik, who was founded in 1988, followed by Hamma Boys. By 1990, Hip Hop was well known among the youth and in October that year thousands of schoolchildren and young adults rose up to fight against rising food prices and neglect of the education system.

Youcef of the group Intik began writing "about the system, the government, because the more that you asked questions, the more you discovered... And as soon as you begin to reflect, you begin to have answers." Algerian rap speaks about the reality of day-to-day life torn by "political injustice, terror, and war", its goal being to give hope to the younger generation.

The Algerian crew MBS, founded in the late 1980s, is considered the most popular Algerian hip hop group. Another group is Intik, which mixes different type of music and languages.
