= Live at the Hi-Fi =

Live at The Hi-Fi

Live album by Kate Miller-Heidke
- Released: 9 October 2009
- Genre: Pop, rock
- Label: Sony Music Australia

Kate Miller-Heidke chronology
Curiouser (2008)	Live at The Hi-Fi (2009)	Nightflight (2012)

Live at the Hi-Fi is a live album by Australian singer-songwriter Kate Miller-Heidke. The album was recorded during her Caught in the Crowd tour on 1 May 2009, at the Hi-Fi Bar, Melbourne. It was released on 9 October 2009 through Sony.

== Track listing ==
(All songs live at the Hi-Fi Bar unless otherwise indicated)

1. "Out and In"
2. "Little Adam"
3. "I Like You Better When You're Not Around"
4. "Mama"
5. "Politics in Space"
6. "Space They Cannot Touch"
7. "Dreams/I Love You"
8. "Are You Fucking Kidding Me?"
9. "Motorscooter"
10. "God's Gift To Women"
11. "No Truck"
12. "Words"
13. "You're the Voice"
14. "Caught in the Crowd"
15. "Can't Shake It"
16. "Walking on a Dream" (studio recording)
17. "For the Hundredth Time (iTunes bonus track)" (originally between "Dreams/I Love You" and "Are You Fucking Kidding Me?")

== Charts ==
Chart performance for Live at the Hi-Fi
Chart (2009)	Peak position
Australian Albums (ARIA)	71

== Release history ==
Country	Release date	Format	Label	Catalogue
Australia	9 October 2009	Digital Download, CD	Sony Music Australia	88697591432
