= Curiouser =

Studio album by Kate Miller-Heidke
- Released: 18 October 2008
- Recorded: Pasadena, California
- Genre: Pop
- Length: 43:00
- Label: Sony BMG
- Producers: Mickey Petralia, Keir Nuttall

Kate Miller-Heidke chronology
Live at the Playroom (2007)	Curiouser (2008)	Live at the Hi-Fi (2009)

Singles from Curiouser
- 1. "Can't Shake It" Released: 4 October 2008; 2. "Caught in the Crowd" Released: 27 February 2009; 3. "The Last Day on Earth" Released: 24 July 2009

Professional ratings
Review scores
Source	Rating
Allmusic	4/5 stars
Planet Sound	7/10 stars
The Mercury	5/5 stars
Rave Magazine	4.5/5 stars

Curiouser is the second studio album by Australian singer-songwriter Kate Miller-Heidke. The first two singles, "Can't Shake It" and "Caught in the Crowd" received moderate success, while the third single "The Last Day on Earth" went on to become her first Australian top ten single, peaking at No. 3 on the ARIA singles chart. The album went on to become one of the most critically applauded albums of 2008 and is Miller-Heidke's first platinum-selling album.

== Background ==
Miller-Heidke explains the album's title: "Mickey (Petralia) thought "Curiouser" was a noun, something that made you more curious," she said. "That's what made up my mind about the title. Wouldn't it be great if people listened to this album and it made them curiouser?".

== Track listing ==
All songs written by Kate Miller-Heidke and Keir Nuttall, produced by Mickey Petralia and Keir Nuttall.

No.	Title	Length
1.	"The One Thing I Know"	3:05
2.	"God's Gift to Women"	3:36
3.	"Caught in the Crowd"	3:33
4.	"Can't Shake It"	3:16
5.	"The Last Day on Earth"	4:47
6.	"I Like You Better When You're Not Around"	3:17
7.	"Motorscooter"	3:07
8.	"The End of School"	4:11
9.	"Politics in Space"	3:27
10.	"Supergirl"	3:19
11.	"Our Song"	3:12
12.	"No Truck"	4:15

Australian and UK iTunes edition
No.	Title	Length
13.	"For the Hundredth Time"	3:06

US edition
No.	Title	Length
13.	"Words"	3:33
14.	"Are You Fucking Kidding Me?" (Live)	3:22

== Singles ==
- "Can't Shake It"

Can't Shake It was released to the radio in late 2008, and became the #1 most added track to the radio in its first week. It debuted and peaked on the ARIA Singles Chart at #38. It was used as part of a television advertisement for the radio station NOVA, and as a result, received extensive air play across Australia. Can't Shake It is Miller-Heidke's 3rd best selling single to date.

- "Caught in the Crowd"

Was highly speculated as the 2nd single in December 2008, as it was getting decent airplay on Triple J. Then it was officially released to radio on 9 February 2009. It was released on 20 February as a physical CD, and coincided with the national tour Miller-heidke embarked on in early 2009. The music video was directed by Stephen Lance and Mairi Cameron. The song also won Miller-Heidke the overall grand prize (US$25,000 in cash and US$20,000 worth of musical equipment, among other prizes) of the prestigious "International Songwriting Competition" 2009 (ISC). Following the success, Caught in the Crowd was released as a Digital Single, with a new song "Are You F***ing Kidding Me", exclusively on iTunes. On 13 November, it was re-released as the 4th single from Curiouser. Caught in the Crowd has gained Gold accreditation in Australia.

- "The Last Day on Earth"

Was not initially released as a single, but has since reached #3 on the Australian ARIA Singles Chart. The song was used for promotions for the block of episodes from the Australian soap opera Neighbours which surrounded the death of Bridget Parker in early July 2009. This in turn caused high sales of the song from her Curiouser album. Due to the high demand for the song, a physical single was quickly produced, and was released on 14 July 2009. The song ended up becoming Kate's first top ten single. "Miller-Heidke" stated that no 3rd single was ever planned. The Last Day on Earth has gone 2× platinum in Australia as of March 2010.

== Charts and certifications ==
=== Weekly charts ===
Chart (2008–10)	Peak position
Australian Albums (ARIA)	2

=== Year-end charts ===
Year	Chart	Rank
2009	Australian ARIA End of year Chart	28

== Certifications ==
Region	Certification	Certified units/sales
Australia (ARIA)	Platinum	70,000^{^}
^{^} Shipments figures based on certification alone.

== Release history ==
Country	Release date	Format	Label	Catalogue
Australia (Standard Edition)	18 October 2008	CD Album, Download	Sony BMG	88697394402
Australia (Special Edition)	16 December 2008	CD Album	Sony BMG	88697394392
