= Mayan hip-hop music =

Mayan Hip-hop is a sub-genre of Hip-hop and rap music which entails the use of Mayan indigenous languages and themes in Hip-hop. The sub-genre was created by Latin Hip-hop artists who wanted to draw attention to Indigenous rights and language preservation. Though the sub-genre is generally unknown, some artists have gained notable popularity, with Mayan Hip-hop even making an appearance on the soundtrack of the 2022 Marvel film Black Panther: Wakanda Forever. Mayan rap is especially popular in Central American countries, such as Guatemala and Mexico.

== History ==
=== Influences ===
Hip-hop's roots in Black communities have led to familiarity across the globe with Black issues. Themes of societal discontent and protest are prominently displayed in different iterations of Hip-hop music, and by extension, Mayan Hip-hop. Scholars have pointed to the sub-genre's existence as a source of solidarity between Black and Indigenous issues.

Pre-Columbian Maya music is typically characterized by wind instruments such as trumpets, flutes, and whistles. Maya rappers typically use these sounds to create the beats in their songs.

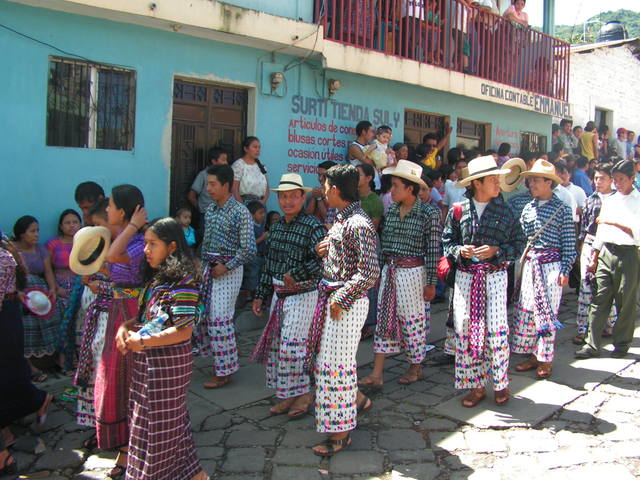
Guatemalan Independence Day

Though the origins of the genre lie in the United States, Latin Hip-hop is the most popular form of Hip-hop and rap in Central America. In Guatemala, where Mayan Hip-hop began, Hip-hop and rap music are strongly associated with gang activity and violence. Many Mayan rappers have chosen to subvert this trend by focusing their music on Indigenous heritage and peaceful living.This thematic focus away from violence has led to the creation of Hip-hop schools in places like Guatemala City to support youth in finding non-gang related activity. One such school called Trasciende uses the strategy of "noncooperation" which says that violence is sustained by participation of people and organizations that support it. Trasciende claims it strives to give power back to the youth and provide them with a community with a collective identity.

The messages and lyrics of Mayan Hip-hop have also gone beyond non-violence. Rebeca Lane, who was born one year after the coup that ended Efrain Rios' reign over Guatemala focuses her lyrics on national healing after the infamous Guatemalan genocide. While Lane herself is Ladino, her lyrics often include indigenous people across Central America. In "Cumbia de la Memoria" Lane sings about the legacy of the genocide for Indigenous Guatemalans.

=== Language preservation ===
Mayan Hip-hop represents only a small part of efforts being made to revitalize indigenous language in Latin America. Latin artists across Central America have used other Indigenous languages to call attention to social and political issues, particularly those regarding race. Through this music, Indigenous rappers are able to share a more rooted ethnic identity. Mayan Hip-hop often includes these themes, with lyrics that span multiple languages. Mayan Hip-hop has been a medium to connect young people of Maya heritage with their cultural roots and encourages them to learn more about the language through music.

Some artists have used Indigenous folklore as inspiration for their music, using texts from the ancient Maya civilization. The Hip-hop group Balam Ajpu has used texts such as the Popul Vuh and the Chilam Balam to write lyrics in their music. These texts were foundational to Maya cultural identity and religious practices. Revitalization of these texts in modern day Hip-hop music represents efforts not only to reconnect Indigenous youth with Mayan language, but Mayan spirituality as well.

== Regional variations ==
There are 28 modern spoken languages that make up the Mayan language family. Mayan Hip-hop reflects this rich and varied language family. As each different lingual zone develops its own type of Hip-hop, they use the language that is primarily used in their area.

Mayan Hip-hop has been used as an expression of societal discontent, with many artists using their music to criticize their government, or broader institutions.

=== Yucatan Peninsula ===
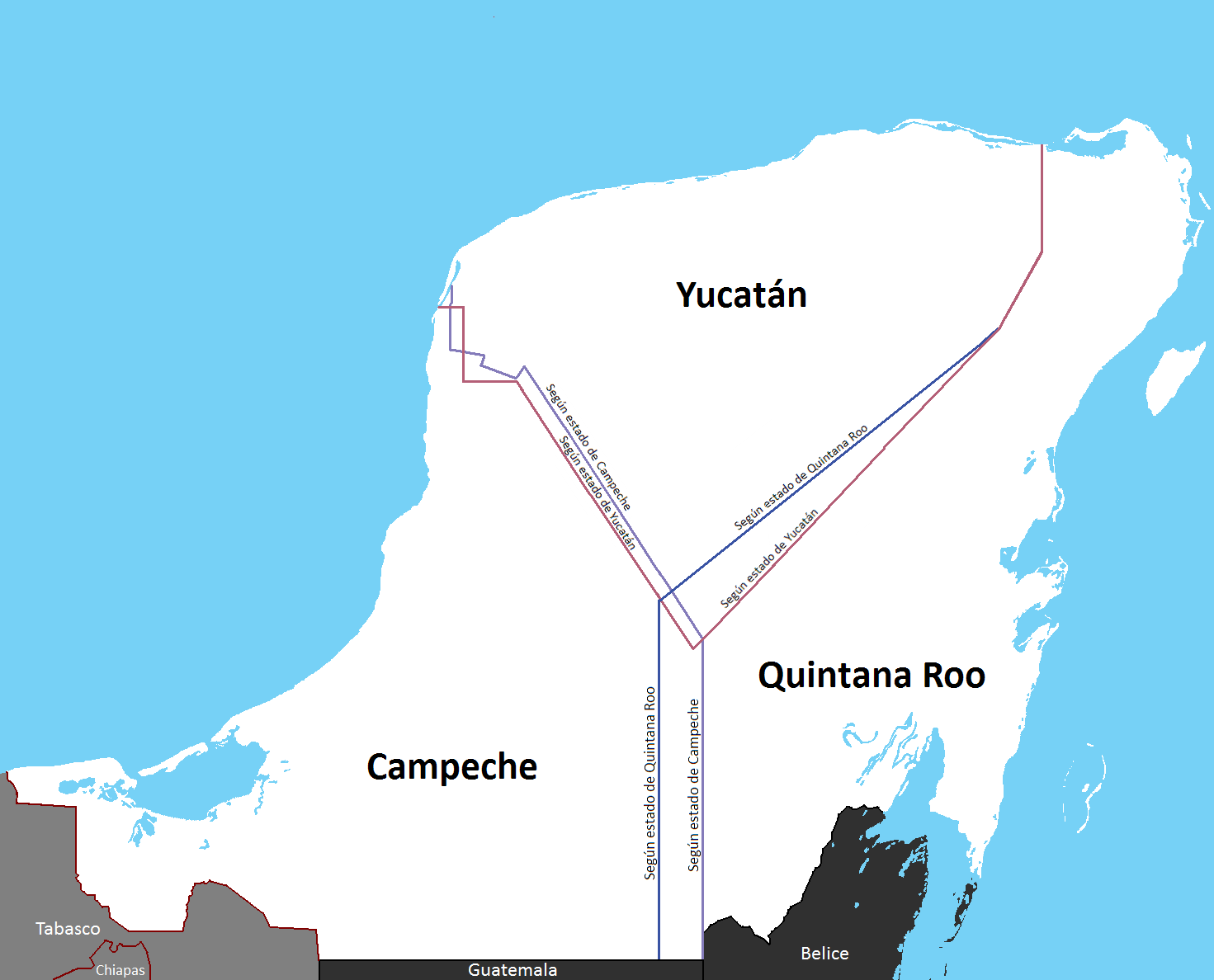
Map of Yucatán, Campeche, Quintana Roo in Mexico

Yucatec Maya is predominantly spoken in the Yucatán peninsula which consists of the Mexican states of Yucatán, Quintana Roo, Campeche, and a small part of Belize. As of 2019, it is the second most spoken indigenous language in Mexico, with 758,000 speakers. This demographic is slowly decreasing in size. As Yucatec Maya diminishes in popularity in the Yucatan peninsula, Mayan Hip-hop offers youth a medium to learn the language.

==== Language usage ====
Since the time of the Spanish conquest and the Maya diaspora, Mayan languages have been threatened. Stigma and shame surround Mayan ethnic origins. Many in the Yucatan peninsula are fighting for Yucatec Maya to be spoken and known. Yucatec Maya has seen a swift decrease due to rapid urbanization. Despite recent improvement in attitudes towards Maya, a lack of intergenerational transmission of Yucatec Maya remains the language's greatest threat.

==== Youth of the Yucatan ====
The struggles of young people in the Yucatec peninsula have defined the sub-genre, as societal pressures from family and gang activity have left the youth with a lack of real direction. Many organizations trying to help youth gain independence in constructive and meaningful ways.

==== Pat Boy ====
Jesús Cristóbal Pat Chablé, more commonly known as the rapper, Pat Boy, was born in José María Pino Suárez in the southeastern state of Quintana Roo to parents who exclusively spoke Mayan. Jacinto Pat, one of Pat Boy's ancestors, fought for social justice in Yucatán Peninsula in the early 1800s, and inspired Pat Boy's stage name. In his early career, Pat Boy tried to imitate American rappers like Snoop Dog or Fifty Cent. When he found minimal response, Pat Boy began to experiment with Mayan lyrics, but limited success led Pat boy to begin experimenting with Yucatan Mayan lyrics.

As Pat Boy's music focuses on indigenous heritage, with lyrics that draw from Mayan culture, customs, and traditions. His music videos highlight scenes from local Mayan communities. Pat Boy has emphasized his efforts to make his music feel welcoming to Indigenous listeners, and remind the world that the Mayan people still exist.

That is what I want to promote among the Mayas. I want them to feel the same as me when I return to my hometown: the happiness, safety and acceptance that comes from arriving at my house, of visiting my mother, of enjoying the food. I want Maya culture to feel like a homecoming to those who have been away. - Pat Boy

In a continued effort to keep the Yucatec Maya language alive, Pat Boy has been leading workshops for children where they learn to write rap and Hip-hop in Mayan. One of his schools is in the Zona Maya of Quintana Roo. Notably, Pat Boy has brought Hip-hop workshops to Los Angeles, California in recent years. Pat Boy's 'Rap Ich Maaya Taan' program facilitates Maya-Spanish speakers to practice improvisation rap. In August 2019, The Los Angeles Times reported on his efforts to vindicate Maya people and culture. The article lauded his success in performing in the Mexican states of Chiapas, Queretaro, and Veracruz, as well as cities such as Monterrey, Mexico City, Los Angeles, and San Francisco

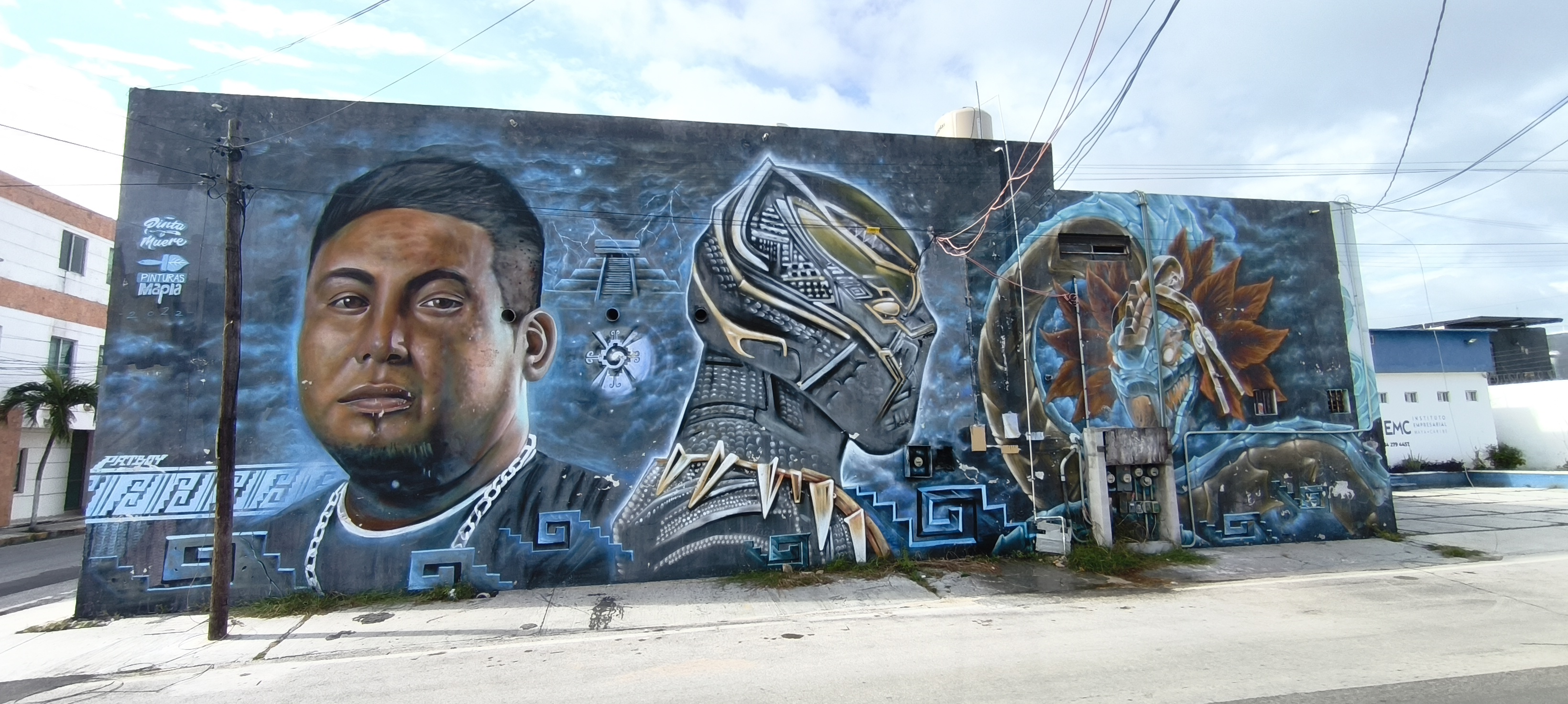
Mural of Pat Boy highlighting his role in Wakanda Forever

Pat Boy's success is reflected in the success of his hit song, "Sangre Maya" which is one of the most listened-to Indigenous rap songs of all time. In a collaboration with other Mayan Hip-hop artists, Pat Boy wrote "Laayli' Kuxa'ano'one" on the Black Panther: Wakanda Forever soundtrack

“A lot of people feel proud. They don’t feel so ashamed to say, ‘I’m of Mayan blood.’” - Pat Boy

=== South Eastern Guatemala ===
The Solola region of Guatemala (west of Guatemala City) consists of three predominant Mayan languages: K'iche', Kakchiquel, and Tz'utujil. Mayan Hip-hop in this region features these languages.

==== Balam Ajpu ====
Map of the spoken Mayan languages across Guatemala

In 2010, a new Mayan Hip-hop group that sings in Tz'utujil was founded under the name Balam Ajpu, which means Jaguar Warrior or Warrior of Light. The band consists of three men named Tzutu Baktun Kan, Yefry Pacheco (M.C.H.E), and Juan Martinez (Dr. Nativo). Tzutu, who started the band, was originally a painter. Che and Juan were already Hip-hop artists. Che had been a part of another very small band called "12 Lunas" while Juan had been writing Hip-hop music in the United States.

Hip-hop in Guatemala prior to Balam Ajpu was mostly an imitation of United States Hip-hop rappers. Though Balam Ajpu was inspired by Hip-hop in the U.S., their use of reggae, Merengue, and Cumbia distinguishes as Central American. The band also employs traditional nylon-stringed guitars, turtle shells for percussion, whistles, and shakers. While performing, the band wears face paint and tribal clothing. While writing the lyrics to their songs, Balam Ajpu consults a Mayan priest who is meant to summon the words from the spiritual realm The band then travels to Lake Atitlán to finalize the lyrics.

The group's debut album on spotify is called Jun Winaq´Rajawal Qíj, or in English, Tribute to the 20 Nawales. Nawales are a set of twenty different guardians/angles that are assigned to each day in the Maya calendar. The nawales repeat 13 times to create a 260-day calendar. The calendar suggests that each person that each person has a certain nawale assigned to them depending on the day they were born. Balam Ajpu's goal is to make Tz'utujil engaging for children, and teach them about their cultural identity. “Our commitment as artists is to rescue the ancient art.” Said Tz’utu Baktun Kan in an interview with AP News.

Another way the group tries to encourage kids to connect to their Maya roots is through working with a free school of "cosmovision: Hip-hop called Escuela Caza Ajaw. With the extreme gang-related violence found in Guatemala, the group aspires to teach young people to live peacefully with one another and with nature by returning to Maya roots. The lyrics of their songs demonstrate Balam Ajpu's commitment to promote a "GuateMayan" identity.

==== Poesia Loca/Pajch'uj Tzij ====
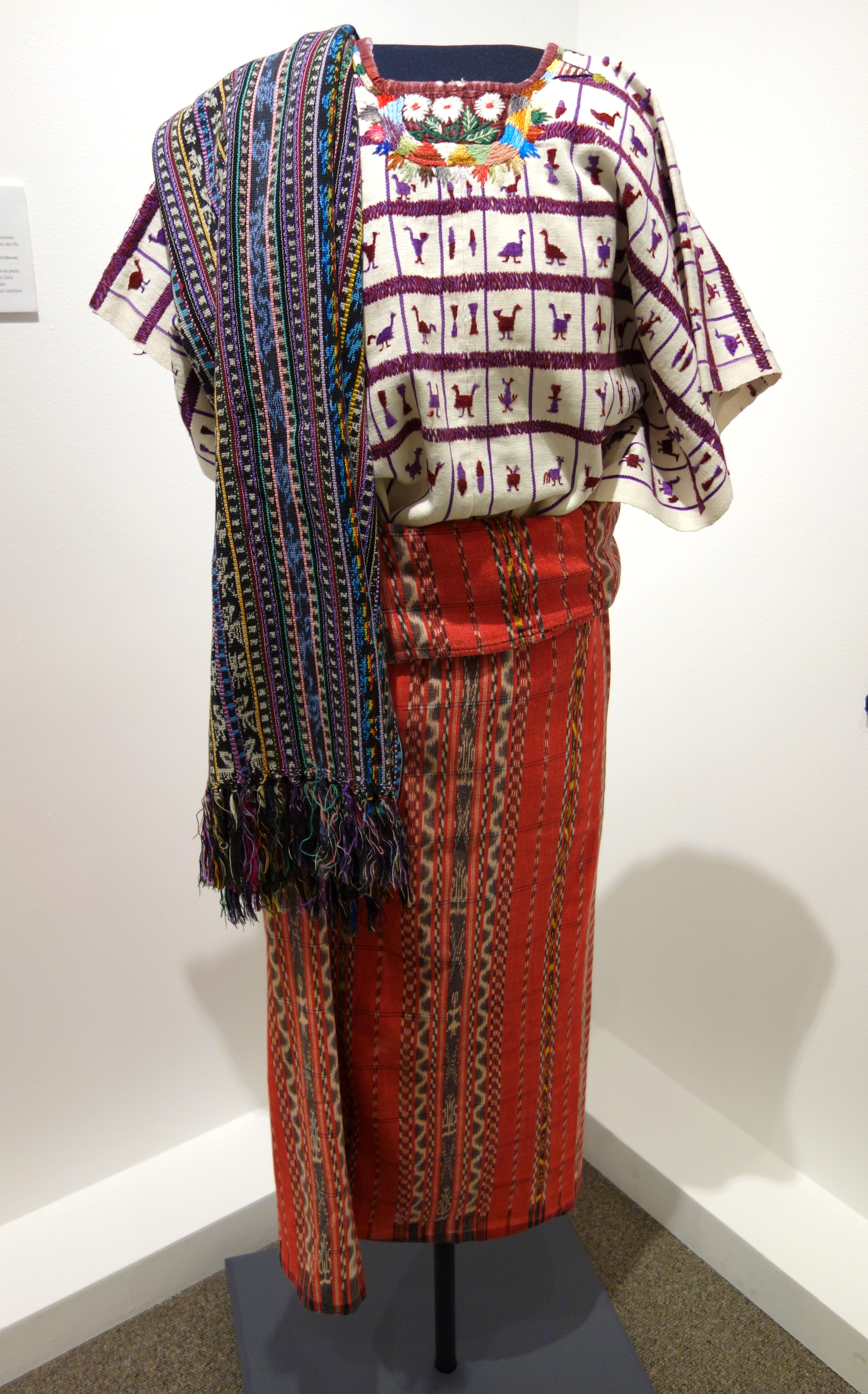
Huipil, skirt, and shawl from Tz'utujil Maya Culture

Later in 2014, another group started to rap using Tz'utujil, alternating between the names "Poesia Loca" and "Pajch'uj Tzij". The three founders Jasy Mendoza, Juvi Hernandez, and Meli Mendoza primarily write about the richness of their culture, love of life, and conservation of nature. In their music videos, the members of Poesia Loca consistently wear traditional Maya clothes. Through their music, the band aspires to preserve their culture and Mayan languages and encourage youth .

“Al principio fue difícil, ya que algunas personas del pueblo lo vieron como una burla al idioma. Hubo cierto rechazo, pues el género era ajeno a nuestra cultura, pero luego que lanzamos el primer sencillo vieron el fruto —que los jóvenes se acercaban al tz’utujil— y ahora lo aceptan”

“At first it was difficult, as some people in the town viewed it as a mockery of the language. There was a certain amount of resistance, since the genre was foreign to our culture, but after we released our first single, they saw the fruits of our labor—that young people were gravitating toward Tz’utujil—and now they accept it.”

-Jasy Mendoza

Chiapas State in Mexico

=== Chiapas ===
The Mexican state of Chiapas near the Mexican-Guatemalan border is home to one of the largest populations of indigenous peoples in the entire country. Indigenous Maya in this area speak the Tzotzil Mayan language. Tzotzil Mayan speakers have also begun to participate in the Mayan Hip-hop movement, notably in the form of the rap group known as Slagem K'op.

This group released six songs on Soundcloud in the Tzotzil language in 2013, garnering limited attention. These songs were accompanied by a music video posted on Youtube later that year for their most popular track, "Muyuk" which was produced using a beat sample from the song "A Mi Me" by Hazhe. Since then, besides a collaboration with the Mexican indie rock band Centarvs on an EP called K'op Kuxul in 2018, Slagem Kop has not released any music.
