= K-Minus Initiative =

Studio album by Commodore 64
- Released: 15 December 1999 (underground release); 23 May 2000 (main release)
- Recorded: 1999
- Genres: Nerdcore hip hop, geeksta rap, hip hop
- Length: 37:48
- Label: Phatinum
- Producer: Lukas Hauser

K-Minus Initiative is the first album by nerdcore (or "geeksta rap") group Commodore 64, released in 1999. It is their first (and only) full-length nerdcore/geeksta rap record to be commercially released. The album sold over 130,000 copies in its first three months of release. Its sound and beats have been linked to that of the early Beastie Boys.

== Track listing ==
1. "Pep Assembly" – 1:55
2. "K-Minus" – 2:34
3. "Sissy MCs" – 2:42
4. "Health Maintenance Organization" – 4:52
5. "Proof of the Riemann Mapping Theorem" – 0:39
6. "Horton Hears a Ho (featuring Saqi4Neeq)" – 3:57
7. "Animal Crackers" – 2:20
8. "Even Do Music!" – 0:32
9. "It's Time for Food (Rhymes)" – 3:50
10. "Fruit Salad" – 3:06
11. "Dutch" – 1:55
12. "Putney Swipe (featuring Prozac)" – 3:27
13. "Straight Outta CompUSA" – 2:19
14. "Foam" – 2:44
15. "Poop Assembly" – 0:53

== Personnel ==
- Smart Money "Bass-I.Q.": vocals, rapping
- Teddy Ruxpin aka "HMO": vocals, rapping
- The Professa MC Squared: vocals, rapping
- DJ Goodbeats - Apple Macintosh: computer, electronic vocals, rapping
