= Arkar =

- အာကာ
- Born: Myanmar
- Occupation: Film Director
- Years active: 2017
- Spouse: Wutt Yi (m. 2017)

Arkar (Burmese: အာကာ) is a Burmese film director and screenwriter.

Formerly an IT worker in Singapore, he moved back to Myanmar to pursue a career as a filmmaker. He gained success with the film The Mystery of Burma: Beyond the Dote-hta-waddy, which was released in Myanmar on 4 May 2018 and in Singapore on 12 September 2018, and nominated for the Myanmar Academy Award 2018.

He is also best known for directing the short film Unbreakable Bond. The film was shot on smartphone and screened on 19 January 2020 at the JCGV Kanthaya Cinema.

== Filmography ==
Year	Title	Director	Writer	Notes	Ref(s).
2018	The Mystery of Burma: Beyond the Dote-hta-waddy	Yes	No		
2019	Tin String	Yes	No		
2019	Two Worlds	Yes	No		
2020	Unbreakable Bond	Yes	Yes		
