= Beyond Hamsterdam =

Soundtrack album by various artists
- Released: January 7, 2008
- Length: 43:05

Beyond Hamsterdam: Baltimore Tracks from The Wire is the second soundtrack album from the television series The Wire.

== Track list ==
No.	Title	Artist	Length
1.	"Way Down in the Hole"	DoMaJe	1:45
2.	"Projects (Produced by Darkroom Productions)"	Tyree Colion	4:32
3.	"Dance My Pain Away (Produced by Rod Lee)"	Rod Lee	2:51
4.	"My Life Extra"	DJ Technics	2:39
5.	"What You Know About Baltimore (Produced By Darkroom Productions)"	Ogun Feat. Phathead	3:59
6.	"Jail Flick (Produced by Darkroom Productions)"	Diablo	4:07
7.	"When You See Us (Produced by Darkroom Productions)"	The Get Em Mamis Feat. L. Cash	4:06
8.	"That's Da Sound"	Dirty Hartz Feat. Verb	3:55
9.	"Ayo"	Bossman	3:52
10.	"The Life, The Hood, The Streetz (Produced by Mbah)"	Mullyman	4:44
11.	"Assume the Position"	Lafayette Gilchrist	6:32
Total length:			43:05
