= Niní Cáffaro =

Dominican singer

Erasmo Alfonso Cáffaro Durán (born 25 November 1939, in San Pedro de Macorís, Dominican Republic), better known as Niní Cáffaro, is a Dominican singer.

== Biography ==
Cáffaro began singing gospel while attending elementary school. He started his professional career as a singer in 1959, participating in the Santo Domingo television show La Hora del Moro, hosted by Rafael Solano and transmitted by Rahintel.

In 1961 he made his first recording, Violeta. Later, in 1962, he recorded Juan Lockward's song "Ayúdame a olvidar".

In 1965, Cáffaro continued his career with the hit song "En ruinas", written by Rafael Solano. Later, he recorded a cover of the famous hit song: "Cada vez más".

Cáffaro became more widely known when he won the First Prize Award of the Festival de la Cancion Dominicana in 1968 with Rafael Solano's song "Por amor". This propelled him to international fame. The next year, he won one of the awards in the first Festival de la Cancion Latina in Mexico. He represented the Dominican Republic in the OTI Festival 1973, with the song "El juicio final", placing third. Cáffaro subsequently performed in Puerto Rico, Colombia, the United States, Venezuela, Spain, Curaçao, Aruba, and Cuba. He became known as El señor de los festivales or "The Festival Master."

Nini Cáffaro is still active as a singer. He currently works for the Cervecería Nacional Dominicana. Cáffaro is married with four children and six grandchildren.

== Discography ==
- Niní Cáffaro y Sus Éxitos (1960)
- Para Ustedes (1965)
- Qué Grande Es el Amor (1967)
- Por Amor (1968)
- Está Bien (1970)
- Niní Cáffaro (1973)
- Viejo Amigo (1994)
