= Ah Moon =

Singer from Myanmar

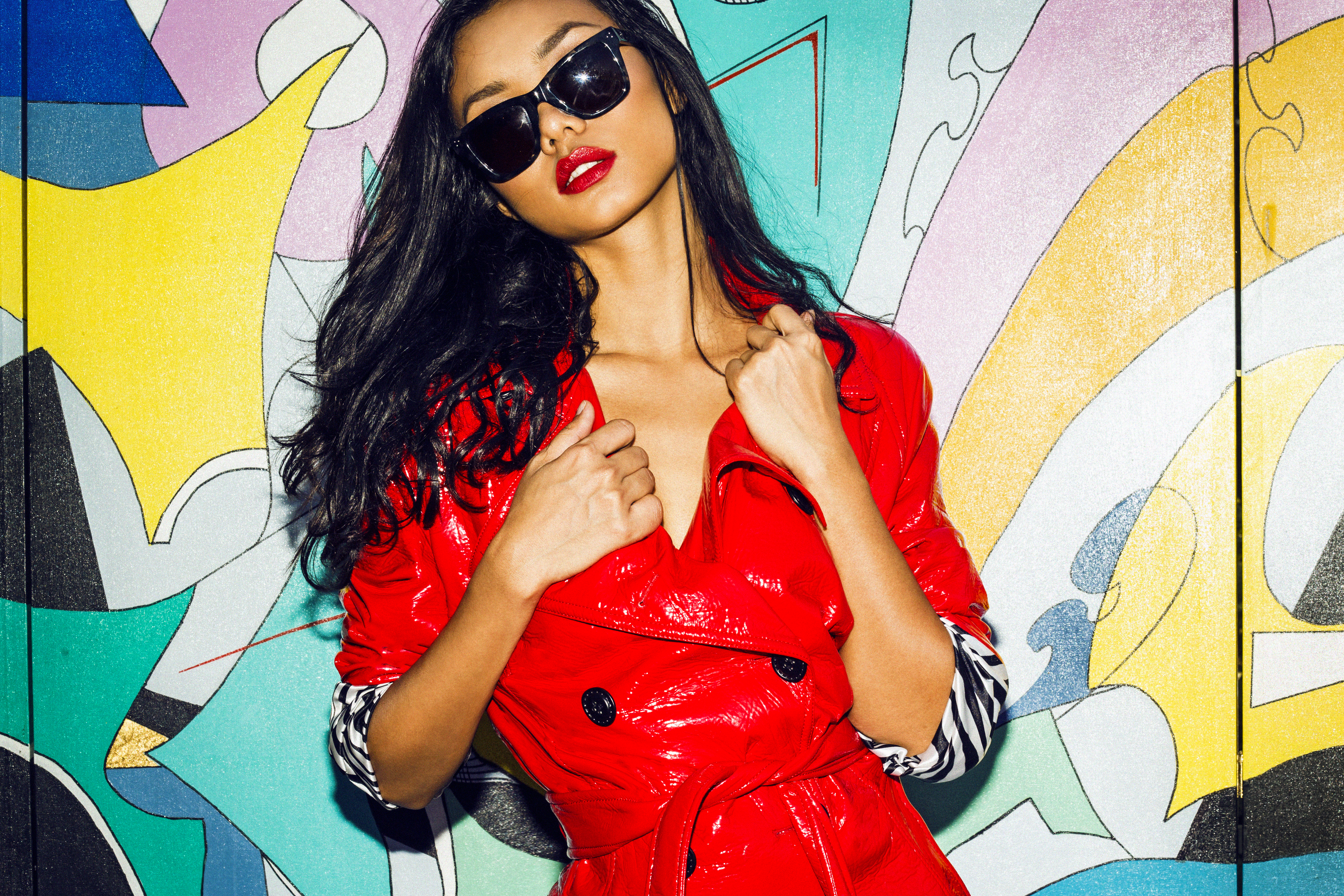

Background information
- Born: Lung Sitt Ja Moon; 19 January 1991 (age 35); Myitkyina, Kachin State, Myanmar
- Genres: Pop; dance
- Occupation: Singer
- Instruments: Vocals; guitar; piano
- Years active: 2010 –present
- Website: www.ahmoonofficial.com

Ah Moon (Burmese: အမွန်း, MLCTS: a mwan: Burmese pronunciation: [a mʊ́ɰ̃]; born Lung Sitt Ja Moon on 19 January 1991) is a singer from the Kachin State of Myanmar. She is a solo artist who was a member of the all-female pop music group the Me N Ma Girls, Burma's first all-girl pop band. Ah Moon's inclusion in the ‘30 Under 30 Asia' list by Forbes in 2018, whilst internationally she has been referred to as "Myanmar's Rihanna".

== Career ==
Ah Moon was born with the Kachin name Lung Sitt Ja Moon in Myitkyina, Burma. She was first exposed to music in church where her father was a Baptist minister. Moon studied acting, singing, dance, languages, violin and piano. Ah Moon speaks five languages and graduated with a degree in Russian from the Yangon University of Foreign Language in 2012. Ah Moon began her career in modeling. In 2009, she won Best Talent in the Miss Christmas Pageant in Yangon, which led her to pursue singing. She also won the Miss Alliance Francaise Pageant, a beauty contest held by the French Embassy, in 2009.

In 2010, Ah Moon was one of five women chosen from 120 candidates responding to a radio and newspaper advertisement to be a part of a girl band named The Tiger Girls created by Nicole May, an Australian dancer who came to Myanmar. In 2011, the Tiger Girls released their first album, Year of the Tiger Girls, and gained domestic and international attention as Burma's first pop girl band. The band later separated from their producer and reformed with a new name, Me N Ma Girls, which is a homophone for Myanmar girls. Me N Ma Girls released a new album, Mingalabar (Welcome), in 2011.

In 2014, Me N Ma Girls was the first band from Myanmar to be nominated for Best Music Video at the VIMA Music Awards for Girl Strong.

=== Solo career ===
In 2014, Moon began working on her first Burmese solo album Min Pay Tae A Chit, which has songs in both Burmese and English. In 2015, she released her second album Automatic (produced by Grammy nominated producer/composer Luigie Gonzalez). In 2017, she released her third album Very Dangerous, which was the number one seller on music stores in Myanmar. Her songs are both in Burmese and English. In 2018, she appeared in the movie Mystery of Burma: Beyond The Dotehtawady. In summer 2018 Moon, alongside popular Myanmar singer Ar T, collaborated with American singer, songwriter and dancer Jason Derulo for the localised version of his song Colors – the official Coca-Cola anthem for the 2018 FIFA World Cup, released through Warner Music Group. In 2020, Ah Moon also collaborated with Denmark singer and songwriter lasse Melting a song called "Each Other's Heroes". Early in the year 2023, Ah Moon went to Norway for a cross-cultural studio collaboration with the singer Sigrid Haanshus, who had enchanted the audience in Norske Talenter. Together with Swedish keyboardplayer Ivan Blomqvist they wrote and produced the song "I Can't Shut My Brain Down", released later that year.

== Discography ==
=== Ah Moon ===
==== Compilation albums ====
- Chronicles X, 2024

==== Studio albums ====
- Min Pay Tae a Chit, 2014
- Automatic , 2015
- Very Dangerous, 2017

==== Singles ====
- Girl Strong (Feat. Me N Ma Girls), 2013
- Myanmar (2014 )
- I'm Sorry (2016)
- Little Butterflies (2017)
- Bring Back My Baby (2017)
- Jinghpaw (2018)
- A Thae Kwe Zat Lann (2018)
- Nway Oo (2020)
- Insane (2020)
- Snow Story (2021)
- Crocodile Tears (2022)
- Kiss (English Version) (2022)
- I Can't Shut My Brain Down (2023) (with Sigrid Haanshus)

==== Features ====
- Unity By Sheridan (2022)

== Filmography ==
=== Films ===
- Miss Nikki and the Tiger Girls(2012 documentary)
- Mystery of Burma: Beyond The Dotehtawady. (2018)
