= The Mystery of Burma: Beyond the Dote-hta-waddy =

2018 Burmese action adventure film

- ဒုဋ္ဌဝတီကိုလွန်၍
- Directed by: Arkar
- Screenplay by: Ye Naung
- Produced by: Golden Hour Entertainment
- Starring: Nine Nine; Joe Moreira; Ah Moon; Naw Aung
- Cinematography: Arkar; Jason Chan
- Edited by: Chan Nyein Aung; Jason Chan; Zin Min
- Music by: Lay Phyu
- Production company: Golden Hour Entertainment
- Distributed by: Cathay Cineplexes Golden Hour Mandalay
- Release date: May 4, 2018
- Country: Myanmar
- Language: Burmese

The Mystery of Burma: Beyond the Dote-hta-waddy is a 2018 Burmese action-adventure film, directed by Arkar and starring Nine Nine, Joe Moreira, Ah Moon and Naw Aung. The film was produced by Golden Hour Entertainment.

The film was officially released on May 4, 2018 in Myanmar and 12 September 2018 in Singapore. It was a critical and commercial success in Myanmar.

== Cast ==
- Nine Nine as Htet Paing
- Ah Moon as Saung Nandar
- Zaw Zaw Aung as Aung Min
- Naw Aung as Gangster
- Joe Moreira as George
- San Htut as Sheriff Thura
