= Can't Shake It =

Single by Kate Miller-Heidke

from the album Curiouser
- A-side: "Can't Shake It"
- B-side: "The End of School"
- Released: 4 October 2008
- Genre: Pop
- Length: 3:16
- Label: Sony BMG
- Songwriter(s): Kate Miller-Heidke, Keir Nuttall
- Producer(s): Mickey Petralia

Kate Miller-Heidke singles chronology
"Space They Cannot Touch" (2008)	"Can't Shake It" (2008)	"Caught in the Crowd" (2009)

"Can't Shake It" is a song recorded by Australian singer Kate Miller-Heidke and released in October 2008 as the lead single from Miller-Heidke's second studio album Curiouser. The song peaked at number 38 on the ARIA Charts.

"Can't Shake It" was nominated for Best Song in the 2009 APRA Music Awards.

== Track listing ==
CD single

1. "Can't Shake It"
2. "The End of School"
3. "Can't Shake It" (Deadwood mix)

== Music video ==
The video features Miller-Heidke as a goddess looking into a doll house at people in each of the rooms doing daily duties such as grocery shopping, mowing the lawn, exercising and working at a job. During the course of the clip, Miller-Heidke uses her goddess powers to turn the movements of these mortals into dance moves, moving in time with the song. These include the shopping trolley, lawnmower and "big fish, little fish, box".

== Charts ==
Chart (2008)	Peak position
Australia (ARIA)	38
