= Me N Ma Girls =

Myanma pop hip hop dance ensemble

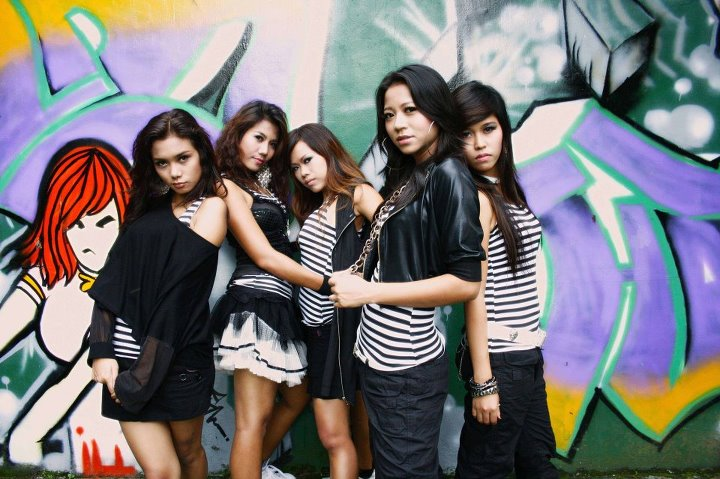
- Me N Ma Girls in early 2012.

Background information
- Origin: Yangon, Myanmar
- Genres: Pop rock, Hip hop, Dance
- Years active: 2010–2014
- Label: Power House Music (2012–2014); They Disband in 2014
- Members: Ah Moon
- Past members: Wai Hnin (2010–2013); Cha Cha (2010–2014); Htike Htike (2010–2014); Kimi (2010–2014)
- Website: www.menmagirls.com

The Me N Ma Girls (formerly known as The Tiger Girls) is the first all-girl pop hip hop dance ensemble from Myanmar discovered by Australian dancer Nicole "Nikki" May and Burmese entrepreneur U Moe Kyaw in 2010. The group currently consists of four Burmese women: Ah Moon, Cha Cha, Htike Htike (pronounced as "Tie Tie"), and Kimi. The girls released their first cover album in 2010, "Year of the Tiger Girls." In 2011, the group split from Kyaw and was renamed as the "Me N Ma Girls.In 2016, the group renamed again "Me N Ma Girls" to "MyaNmar Girls"

As The Me N Ma Girls grew in popularity, their views regarding censorship and other social issues took center stage. The Group entered the international stage and gained notoriety when they debuted their country's first overtly political song Come Back Home, in May 2012 during a visit from then United States Ambassador-at-Large for Global Women's Issues Melanne Verveer in the Office on Global Women's Issues. Shortly after their appearance, their story was made into a documentary, Miss Nikki and the Tiger Girls, and was directed by the award-winning director, Juliet Lamont. The group signed with the independent American music label, Power Music of Los Angeles, California — the first for any pop and hip hop band from Myanmar.

== History ==
=== Formation and the Tiger Girls ===
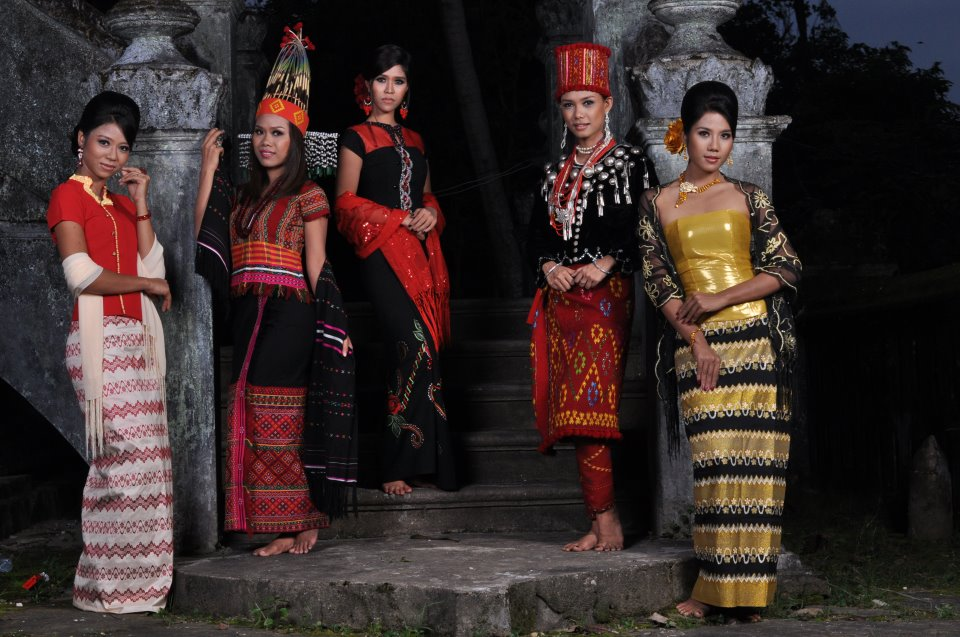
Me N Ma Girls in their traditional Burmese attire.

The Tiger Girls were formed as a result of a talent competition sponsored by Australian dancer Nicole "Nikki" May and Burmese entrepreneur U Moe Kyaw. In January 2010, May auditioned 120 women at the 50th Street Bar in Yangon. Five young ladies, Ah Moon, Cha Cha, Htike Htike, Kimi and Wai Hnin were chosen and formed the original group. They debuted eight weeks later on the main stage at Thingyan, Myanmar's New Year's Festival.

The college educated young women come from different areas in Myanmar. Ah Moon, from Myitkyina, the capital of Kachin State, earned a degree in Russian from Yangon University of Foreign Languages; Kimi from Chin State, earned a degree in mathematics at Dagon University in Yangon; Cha Cha, from the Yangon area earned a degree in Zoology from Dagon University; Htike Htike, from the Yangon area, earned a graphic design degree from University of Computer Studies, Yangon and Wai Hnin, Yangon earned a degree in chemistry from University of East Yangon (Tarwa).

The Tiger Girls adopted stage names that embodied their own character and style. The Group's stage names are "Chilli" (Kimi), "Tricky" (Wai Hnin), "Missy" (Cha Cha), "Electro" (Htike Htike) and "Baby" (Ah Moon).

The Group released their first CD, Year of the Tiger Girl, in July 2010. The CD included cover tunes called copy tracks, which are western pop songs rewritten in Burmese. Their early performances followed traditional K-Pop style, a popular form of music originating from South Korea.

After the release of their first CD, the Tigers Girls gained popularity in Yangon, but received criticism for their unconventional appearance and performance style. May deliberately selected young ladies who challenged the popular K-Pop mold by choosing young women who were the "atypical doll-like girl band" made popular in Asian culture, a concept not shared by co-founder Kyaw. Artistic and fundamental differences regarding the direction of the Group resulted in the dissolution of the business partnership between May and Kyaw. Ultimately, the Tiger Girls followed May and renamed themselves "Me N Ma Girls," a play on their country's name, Myanmar.

=== Transition to Me N Ma Girls ===
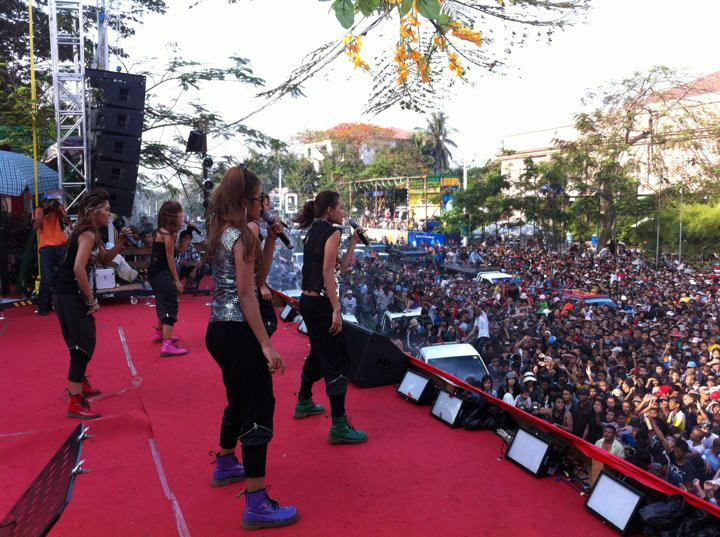
Me N Ma Girls live at the Thingyan New Year's Festival in Yangon in April 2012.

The group's transformation from the Tiger Girls to Me N Ma Girls coincided with former U.S. Secretary of State Hillary Clinton's historic trip to Myanmar in December 2011, which helped foster sweeping democratic reforms in the country, most notably in the area of censorship. On December 17, 2011, the band released their second album Mingalarpar, which means "welcome" in Burmese. Eleven of the tracks are originals, with collaborations from local artists San Pee, J-Me and Ar-T, as well as their manager, May. The lone cover song is a Myanmar favorite composed four decades ago by Alinka Kyaw Swar Shwe Pyi Aye.

Myanmar conducted a historic Burmese by-elections of April 2012, in which pro-democracy icon and national hero Daw Aung San Suu Kyi ran for political office. In response, the Me N Ma Girls began writing their country's first overtly political song, "Come Back Home." The song was directed at the 10% of the population, about a half million people, who left Myanmar due to repression and poverty.

"Come Back Home" was first performed in May 2012 at a private lunch with former United States Ambassador-at-Large for Global Women's Issues from the Office of Global Women's Issues, Melanne Verveer, upon her visit to Myanmar. In her speech, Former Ambassador Verveer remarked, "I thought that it was a fitting ending to this trip that I just have been privileged to take to be able to hear young people sing out so eloquently for a new day, a new day that they want to have and they want to see realized in their country."

==== Change of music trends in Myanmar ====
The music scene in Myanmar continued to change with the lifting of censorship regulations. According to Heather MacLachlan, a professor at the University of Dayton in Ohio and author of the book "Burma's Pop Music Industry: Creators, Distributors, Censors", the struggle for women's rights, especially in the music industry, goes beyond the censors: "It's not just the censors, I mean, those are Burmese values." "I've NEVER seen girls behave like that, ever." Only a handful of venues are permitted to host concerts in general in Myanmar with women playing in bars often being equated to the sex industry.

The Me N Ma Girls did not intentionally set out to revolutionize the image of modern Burmese women but by choosing bold outfits, sharp dance moves, and hip hop rhythms for their live appearances shattered stereotypes of women in Myanmar. However, with ever-changing censorship regulations, the group continue to be on target with the movement.

The group wrote, "Soft-rock ballads and big power ballads still dominate mainstream, but the young people are beginning to embrace pop, R&B and hip-hop. Bands are realizing the need to write original music rather than doing ripped versions of international tracks. Freedom of expression is coming alive. Indie rockers, punks, drum-and-bass DJs, dubstep DJs and some great dance producers are emerging."

=== Record deal with Power House Music and international exposure ===
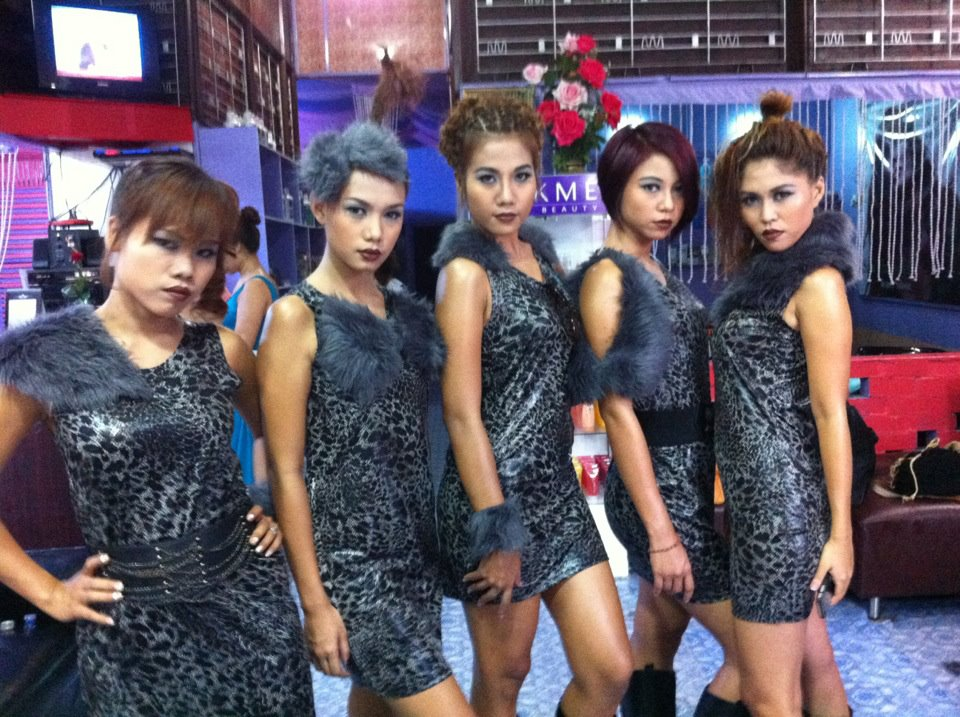
The Me N Ma Girls in the Summer of 2012.

The “Me N Ma Girls” continued to expand their artistic identity during performances and through their compositions by taking risks uncommon for women in the music scene in Myanmar. The Group travelled outside Myanmar to Bangkok, Thailand in 2011 and Singapore in 2012.

As their exposure in the region increased, the Group caught to the eye of a record executive in the United States. In June 2012, the Group signed with Dan Hubbert, owner of American record production company Power House Music of Los Angeles. The Group travelled to the United States for the first time and spent time in Los Angeles recording their first Western-pop style and single, entitled "Girl Strong." During the trip, the Group performed at the closing performance of the Women in the World Summit in New York City.

The Me N Ma Girls continued their international travel and returned to Singapore to perform at the quarterfinals of the 2012 Singapore Cup, and the Music Matters Live Festival, which include a special performance for the delegates at the event. The Group also participated in the Chime for Change campaign sponsored by Gucci, which focused on change for girls and women across the world in education, justice and health.

In July 2013, Wai Hnin left the Group due to greater family responsibilities. Remaining members Ah Moon, Cha Cha, Hitke Hitke and Kimi decided not to replace Wai Hnin and continued with plans to expand their international presence on the music scene. The Group returned to Los Angeles in August 2013 to film the music video for "Girl Strong," and an exclusive release of the song "Someday" on iTunes specifically to benefit the Worldwide Orphans Foundation, an organization that addresses the medical and developmental conditions of children living in orphanages abroad.

In September 2013, the “Me N Ma Girls” were featured in SBS Dateline Australia story on the changes happening in Myanmar. "The Road to Democracy" story featured the Group who talked about the freedom opening up for their generation and their success in the United States. After leaving the United States, the Me N Ma Girls traveled back to Thailand and performed on Women to Women and The Morning Show. After Thailand, the group headed to Hong Kong for interviews on RTHK's The Morning Brew, Teen Time and Bangkok's DJ Momay's Show, EAZY 105.

In January 2014, members Htike Htike and Cha Cha also left the group, due to a contractual dispute. According to their agreement with Power House Music, all of their solo work would also be owned by the company. Rather than accept this, both women decided to leave the group to better focus on solo careers of their own. Ah Moon and Kimi plan to go forward with releasing a Me N Ma Girls album later in 2014.

== Discography ==
=== Studio albums ===
Independently released

- Year of the Tiger Girls (2010)
- Mingalarpar (2011)
- Shake it (2016)

=== Singles ===
Released under Power Music, Inc.

- Come Back Home (2012)
- Fill Me Up (2013)
- Girl Strong (2013)
- Someday (2013)

== Filmography ==
- Miss Nikki and the Tiger Girls (2012 documentary)

== See also ==
- List of all-female bands
- Music of Burma
