= Camilo Sesto discography =

- Studio albums: 25
- Live albums: 3
- Compilation albums: 90
- Singles: 130
- Video albums: 5
- Musical theatre: 2
- Record labels: Movieplay; Ariola; BMG; Elica Records; Universal; Sony Music

The discography of Spanish singer-songwriter Camilo Sesto was released in Argentina, Venezuela, Bolivia, Chile, Colombia, Costa Rica, Dominican Republic, Ecuador, El Salvador, Guatemala, Honduras, Nicaragua, Panama, Paraguay, Peru, Uruguay, Brazil, Mexico, United States, and Canada. It was also distributed in South Africa, Japan, Taiwan, and various countries in Europe, including Spain, Portugal, France, Germany, Austria, the United Kingdom, the Benelux region (Belgium, the Netherlands, and Luxembourg), and Scandinavia.

In Spain, their complete discography was released on CD in 1998, followed by releases in Mexico in 1999, and across Latin America in 2000. More than 30 compilations albums presented by the artist and 60 record label-initiated compilations in various countries. (Note: This list excludes 8-track cartridges, promotional releases, annual reissues, anniversary editions, club editions, variants, and misprints.)

The artist recorded in several languages, including Spanish, English, Italian, German, Portuguese, and Valencian. Additionally, he performed duets with artists such as Ángela Carrasco, Charytín, Lani Hall, Audrey Landers, Alaska, Raquel Ramírez, Rocío Dúrcal, Scarlata, Lisa Ball, Judy Collins, Camilo Michael Blanes, Isabel Patton, Andrea Bronston, Marina Zapata, Marta Sánchez, Pastora Soler, Ruth Lorenzo, Mónica Naranjo, Pandora, Carlos Rivera, Yuri, Natalia Jiménez, and Pope Francis. (Note: The figure of 100 million records sold is supported by multiple sources. Billboard estimates the figure at 180 million.)

== Albums ==
=== Studio ===
- 1971: Algo de mí
- 1972: Sólo un hombre
- 1973: Algo más
- 1974: Camilo
- 1975: Amor libre
- 1975: Jesucristo Superstar (2×LP)
- 1976: Memorias
- 1976: Look in the eye
- 1977: Rasgos
- 1977: Entre amigos
- 1978: Sentimientos
- 1979: Horas de amor
- 1980: Amaneciendo
- 1981: Más y más
- 1982: Con ganas
- 1982: Camilo (In english with Judy Collins)
- 1983: Camilo (In english)
- 1983: Amanecer/84
- 1985: Tuyo
- 1986: Agenda de baile
- 1991: A voluntad del cielo
- 1992: Huracán de amor
- 1994: Amor sin vértigo
- 2000: El fantasma de la ópera (Unreleased)
- 2002: Alma (with Isabel Patton)
- 2003: Alma (with Andrea Bronston)
- 2018: Camilo sinfónico (CD + DVD)

=== Live ===
- 2010: Todo De Mí (October 1 and 2 in Madrid) (2×CD + DVD + 120 Pages Book / Deluxe Edition)
- 2025: Camilo Love Sound Typhoon (Osaka '85 in concert)

=== Singles & EP ===
- 1970: Llegará el verano / Sin dirección (Camilo Sexto)
- 1970: Buenas noches / Esa paloma
- 1972: To be a man / Something
- 1972: To be a man / Now is my time
- 1973: Algo mais / Todo por nada
- 1974: Con el Mariachi Oro y Plata de José Chávez (EP)
- 1974: Un saludo a México de Camilo Sesto
- 1974: Rote rosen im haar / Ajudadme
- 1974: Sonderauflage für hörfunk und fernsehen (EP)
- 1976: Solo tu / Good bye my love
- 1977: ¿Queres ser minha amante? / Melina / Só tu (EP)
- 1977: Jamie (My love) / Nothing better (Included in the Duas Vidas international soundtrack)
- 1977: Jamie (My love) / Don't tell
- 1980: Colorina / Instrumental (Main theme song of the telenovela Colorina)
- 1982: Vivir así es morir de amor / Terciopelo y piedra 愛ゆえに
- 1985: To say así / Celos それが僕さ
- 1985: Acompáñame / Amor de mujer ロマンスーこの愛に生きて
- 2003: Remixes
- 2006: Canta a Bujalance
- 2011: Four hits (EP)
- 2016: Padre nuestro (with Pope Francis)
- 2016: El meu cor es d'Alcoi / Amor amar (Marcha mora)
- 2018: Vivir así es morir de amor (Reworked by La Casa Azul)
- 2020: Perdóname / Perdóname (Demo)

=== Compilations ===
- 1973: Camilo Sesto
- 1974: Algo de mí
- 1974: Camilo Sesto... Nuestro amigo
- 1975: Álbum de oro
- 1976: Los súper éxitos de Camilo Sesto
- 1976: Les plus grands succès de Camilo Sesto
- 1976: Colección de Camilo Sesto (3×LP)
- 1976: Antología de... Camilo Sesto / 12 éxitos
- 1977: Los éxitos de... Pablo Abraira / Camilo Sesto
- 1977: Grandes éxitos de Camilo Sesto
- 1977: Los discos de oro de Camilo Sesto
- 1978: Los discos de oro de Camilo Sesto Volumen 2
- 1978: Sentimientos (悲しみ)
- 1979: Superéxitos Volumen 2
- 1979: Colección de Camilo Sesto Vol. III (3×LP)
- 1979: Los mas grandes éxitos
- 1980: ¡¡Bienvenidos!! Camilo Sesto y Ángela Carrasco
- 1980: ¡¡Bienvenidos!! Camilo Sesto y Ángela Carrasco Volumen 2
- 1980: 15 éxitos más grandes
- 1980: 15 éxitos
- 1981: Los 15 grandes éxitos de Camilo Sesto
- 1981: 24 súper éxitos (2×LP)
- 1981: El espectacular de Camilo Sesto
- 1981: 15 éxitos de amor
- 1982: Muy personal / Mis 20 grandes éxitos (2×LP)
- 1982: Los 14 grandes éxitos de:
- 1982: 16 grandes éxitos
- 1982: El especial de Camilo Sesto
- 1983: El amor de mi vida (君がどこにいても)
- 1983: Acompáñame (ロマンスーこの愛に生き)
- 1984: Entre amigos (友達の間に)
- 1984: Los grandes éxitos de Camilo Sesto
- 1984: 15 grandes éxitos de Camilo Sesto Volumen II
- 1984: Los 10 súper éxitos de Camilo Sesto
- 1984: Lo mejor de Camilo Sesto
- 1985: Bienvenido
- 1985: Otros 16 grandes éxitos
- 1985: Best of (ベスト・オブ・カミロ・セスト)
- 1985: Grandes éxitos
- 1986: 14 números uno de Camilo
- 1987: Perdóname
- 1988: Amor libre
- 1988: Frente a frente - Camilo Sesto / Miguel Gallardo
- 1988: 16 grandes éxitos
- 1989: "El amor de mi vida" y sus más grandes éxitos
- 1989: La serie de los 20 éxitos
- 1989: Lo mejor de Camilo Sesto (4×Cassette)
- 1989: Grandes éxitos Vol. 2
- 1989: Grandes éxitos Vol. 3
- 1990: Lo mejor (3×LP)
- 1990: 14 grandes éxitos de Camilo
- 1990: Amor libre / 12 grandes éxitos
- 1990: Sucesos
- 1990: Las 15 grandes de Camilo
- 1991: 16 grandes éxitos
- 1991: Serie 20 éxitos
- 1992: Los más grandes de la canción - Emmanuel / Camilo Sesto / José Feliciano (3×LP)
- 1992: Colección de platino (2×LP)
- 1993: Sus grandes éxitos
- 1993: Colección espectacular 20 éxitos Vol. 1
- 1993: La música de tu vida
- 1994: No sabes cuanto te quiero
- 1994: Círculo de grandes estrellas Vol. 1
- 1994: Frente a frente - Rocío Dúrcal / Camilo Sesto (3×CD)
- 1994: Lo máximo de Camilo Sesto
- 1994: 2 en 1 – Camilo / Rasgos
- 1995: Serie platino: 20 éxitos
- 1996: Grandes éxitos - Amigos
- 1996: The best Vol. I
- 1996: The best Vol. II
- 1997: Camilo superstar (2×CD)
- 1997: 2 en 1 – Algo de mí / Algo más
- 1999: Lo mejor de lo mejor (2×CD)
- 2001: Grandes éxitos Vol. 2
- 2002: Gold
- 2004: Nº 1 (2×CD + DVD)
- 2006: Las número 1 (2×CD)
- 2007: 20 grandes éxitos
- 2011: Camilo Sesto recupera tus clásicos (4×CD)
- 2011: 45 éxitos originales (3×CD)
- 2012: Dos clásicos - Con ganas / A voluntad del cielo (2×CD)
- 2012: Frente a frente - Raphael / Camilo Sesto (2×CD)
- 2013: Esencial Camilo Sesto (2×CD)
- 2014: Sus favoritas... (2×CD)
- 2014: Antología: 20 éxitos
- 2016: Camilo 70 (3×CD)
- 2022: Camilo forever (4×CD + 200 Pages Book / Deluxe Edition)

== Duets and Collaborations ==
Year	Artist	Album	Singles
1976	Raquel Ramírez	Memorias	Por amor
1978	Ángela Carrasco	Amigo mío, cuenta conmigo	Callados
1979	Ángela Carrasco	Ángela Carrasco	Corazones de fuego
1982	Rocío Dúrcal	Live	Amanecí en tus brazos
1982	Rocío Dúrcal	Live	Volver, volver
1982	Rocío Dúrcal	Live	Ella
1982	Rocío Dúrcal	Live	Perdóname
1982	Judy Collins	Camilo	Shoulder to Shoulder
1983	Lisa Ball	Live	You don't bring me flowers
1984	Lani Hall	Lani Hall	Corazón encadenado
1984	Lani Hall	Lani Hall	Si tú fueras capaz
1984	Audrey Landers	Holiday dreams	Mi amor
1984	Audrey Landers	Wo der südwind weht	Mi amor
1984	Audrey Landers	Honeymoon in trinidad	Mi amor
1984	Audrey Landers	Where the south wind blows	Mi amor
1984	Audrey Landers	Mi amor	Mi amor
1984	Audrey Landers	Best of	Mi amor
1985	Charytín	Verdades desnudas	Ni tú, ni yo
1986	Lisa Ball	Agenda de baile	Amor brujo
1992	Scarlata	Huracán de amor	No digas no
1994	Camilo Michael Blanes	Amor sin vértigo	Sentimiento de amor
1997	Alaska	—	El amor de mi vida
1997	Alaska	—	Vivir así es morir de amor
2001	Various Artists	—	Torrelodones canta
2002; 2003	Isabel Patton; Andrea Bronston	Alma	The Phantom of the Opera
2002; 2003	Isabel Patton; Andrea Bronston	Alma	All I Ask of You
2002; 2003	Isabel Patton; Andrea Bronston	Alma	The Point of No Return
2010	Marina Zapata	Todo de mí	Callados (Live)
2016	Pope Francis	—	Padre nuestro
2018	Marta Sánchez	Camilo sinfónico	Perdóname
2018	Pastora Soler	Camilo sinfónico	Quererte a ti
2018	Ruth Lorenzo	Camilo sinfónico	Amor... amar
2018	Natalia Jiménez	Camilo sinfónico	Amor... amar
2018	Carlos Rivera	Camilo sinfónico	Algo de mí
2018	Pandora	Camilo sinfónico	Perdóname
2018	Yuri	Camilo sinfónico	Quererte a ti

== Composer and Producer ==
Year	Artist	Album	Singles
1970	Federico Cabo	—	Llegará la noche / La oficina
1970	Luis Gardey	—	Mi buen amor / Si la nieve resbala
1972	Encarnita Polo	—	Dale que te dale / Ay! sandunga
1972	Magos de Oz	—	El dinero / Solo nosotros
1972	Sanyago	—	Fresa salvaje / Tal vez mañana
1973	Marisol	—	Quédate a desayunar / Todo puede suceder
1973	Cristina	Mis amigos me llaman Cris	—
1973	Cristina	—	Vamos al circo / Amor prohibido
1973	Sanyago	—	Busco un trébol / Volver a un mundo mejor
1973	Sanyago	—	A pleno Sol / Ven háblame
1975	Harold y Maud	Harold y Maud	—
1975	Manolo Otero	Manolo Otero	—
1975	Miguel Bosé	—	Soy / For ever for you
1976	Miguel Bosé	—	Es tan fácil... / Who
1978	Sergio Fachelli	—	Y ahora qué / Soñé
1978	Ángela Carrasco	Amigo mío cuenta conmigo	—
1979	José José	Si me dejas ahora	—
1979	Ángela Carrasco	Ángela Carrasco	—
1980	Lucía Méndez	Regálame esta noche… Colorina	—
1980	José José	Amor amor	—
1980	Ángela Carrasco	—	Ahora o nunca / Un hombre macho
1981	Rocío Dúrcal	Confidencias	—
1982	Guillermo Dávila	Tiempo libre	—
1982	Dorian	Dorian	—
1982	Lucía Méndez	Cerca de ti	—
1982	Leonardo Jury	—	¿Quién mejor que yo? / Dos al teléfono
1982	Las Gil	Más cerca de ti	—
1982	Alcatraz	Sensaciones	—
1983	Ángela Carrasco	Unidos	—
1984	Sergio Fachelli	Hay amores… y amores	—
1984	Lani Hall	Lani Hall	—
1985	Charytín	Verdades desnudas	—
1986	Manuel Fernando	Alma y fuego	—
1986	Francisco	Héroes de amor	—
1993	José José	30 Años de ser el príncipe	—
1997	Fangoria + Camilo Sesto	—	—
1998	José José	Y algo más	—
2002	David Bustamante	Bustamante	—
2003	Pedro David	Desafíos de amor	—
2009	Daniel Leal	Daniel Leal	—
2021	Ángela Carrasco	—	Él y yo

== Videography ==
- 1985: De Madrid Con Amor マドリッドより愛をこめて (Laserdisc/VHS)
- 2004: Camilo Sesto Nº 1 (DVD)
- 2010: Todo De Mí (DVD)
- 2016: Camilo 70 (DVD)
- 2018: Camilo Sinfónico (DVD)
