= Liricas Analas =

Liricas Analas is a rap group from the canton of Grisons, Switzerland. Their first album, Analogia, is the first rap album in the Romansh language. Author and anthropologist Pascal Hofmeier notes that in choosing to rap in Romansh, a language spoken by only a few thousand people, yet instantly identifiable as Swiss, Liricas Analas takes the concept of Lokalpatriotismus (local pride), which is so prevalent in the Swiss hip-hop scene, to an extreme level. Their 2006 CD, AnalFaBad, contained the chart-topping song "Siemis".

== Members ==
- Pius a.k.a. pddp
- Just
- Flepp
- Orange a.k.a. Pumaranza
- Spoon
- DJ Gionson
- DJ Suit

== Discography ==
- Analogia (2004)
- AnalFaBad (2006)
- Analectrica (2009)
- Analium (2012)
- Banalitad (2016)
- LIRICAS ANALAS (2022)
