= Caught in the Crowd =

- Original release cover

Single by Kate Miller-Heidke

from the album Curiouser
- Released: 27 February 2009
- Recorded: Pasadena, California
- Genre: Pop
- Length: 3:33
- Label: Sony BMG
- Songwriters: Kate Miller-Heidke, Keir Nuttall
- Producer: Mickey Petralia

Kate Miller-Heidke singles chronology
"Can't Shake It" (2008)	"Caught in the Crowd" (2009)	"The Last Day on Earth" (2009)

Alternative covers
- Re-release cover

"Caught in the Crowd" is a song by Australian singer songwriter Kate Miller-Heidke. It was released in February 2009 as the second single to be lifted from Miller-Heidke's second album Curiouser. It was written by Kate Miller-Heidke and Keir Nuttall. The song peaked at number 33 on the ARIA Charts and was certified gold.

== Background ==
On Miller-Heidke's official website she states; "'Caught in the Crowd' is a different kind of song, with a double tug of the heart-string behind the gentle texture of music, and the recognisably real story of a lingering childhood regret and she cried."

The song is a first-person account by a passive observer towards bullying and the regret they experience later in life. In speaking with The Feed's Patrick Abboud about the song's origins, she revealed that “I was never the bully but I was definitely bullied and I also saw other people being bullied, and didn't have the courage to step in and then later regretted it.”

== International songwriting competition ==
In April 2009 Katie Miller-Heidke and Keir Nuttall were awarded the US$25,000 Grand Prize in the 2008 International Songwriting Competition for their composition "Caught in the Crowd".

== Music video ==
The music video was directed by Stephen Lance and Mairi Cameron.

The video starts in a laboratory with Heidke looking through the room with a torch. She pulls the sheet off a piece of equipment and tears out a drawing of a boy in a notebook. She drops it into some liquid chemicals and the drawing comes to life. Through the drawings in the notebook, we see flashbacks telling the story of the song.

The music video was filmed in lab 8 of the science block at Brisbane Grammar School.

== Video competition ==
"Caught in the Crowd" was the subject of a 2009 schools video competition, in which students were invited to highlight the issue of bullying by producing a music video for the song. The competition was promoted through social networking site MySpace and The Daily Telegraph, and was supported by the NSW Department of Education & Training and Kids Help Line. Among the schools that participated, Miller-Heidke selected a rendition by Dandenong High School to be uploaded to her official channel.

== Digital release ==
A digital version of the physical CD single was released on 20 February 2009 which features the same tracks along with an additional track, "Kid on a Leash", on the iTunes release.

A separate digital single was released after the song won Miller-Heidke and partner Keir Nuttall first prize at the International Songwriting Competition. Two songs, different from the physical release, accompanied "Caught in the Crowd" on the digital release. It included the previously unreleased song, "Are You Fucking Kidding Me?", recorded at one of her concerts on the Caught in the Crowd Tour. Due to the potential confusion between the two releases, the initial release is named Caught In the Crowd - EP on Miller-Heidke's iTunes Store.

== Track listing ==
CD single

1. "Caught in the Crowd" - 3:33
2. "Caught in the Crowd" (Concept Car Remix) - 4:14
3. "Can't Shake It" (Concept Car Remix) - 6:07

Digital download single (exclusive to iTunes)

1. "Caught in the Crowd" - 3:33
2. "Are You Fucking Kidding Me?" - 3:19
3. "Can't Shake It" (Disco Dommage Remix) - 4:09
4. "Kid on a Leash" - 2:26

== Charts ==
=== Weekly charts ===
Chart (2009/10)	Peak position
Australia (ARIA)	33

=== End of Year Charts ===
Year	Chart	Rank
2009	Australian Artists Singles	28
2010	Australian Artists Singles	37

=== Certifications ===
Region	Certification	Certified units/sales
Australia (ARIA)	Gold	35,000^{^}
^{^} Shipments figures based on certification alone.

== Release history ==
Country	Release date	Format	Label	Catalogue
Australia	27 February 2009	CD single, digital download	Sony BMG	88697488872
Australia	27 November 2009 (re-release)	CD single, digital download	Sony BMG	88697619102
