= Words (Kate Miller-Heidke song) =

Single by Kate Miller-Heidke

from the album Little Eve
- A-side: "Words"
- B-side: "We're Gonna Need Love"
- Released: 26 May 2007
- Genre: Pop,
- Label: Sony BMG
- Songwriter(s): Keir Nuttall

Kate Miller-Heidke singles chronology
"Apartment" (2006)	"Words" (2007)	"Make It Last" (2007)

"Words" is a song by Australian singer Kate Miller-Heidke, released on 26 May 2007 as the lead single from Miller-Heike's debut studio album Little Eve. The song peaked at number 43 on the ARIA Charts.

== Music video ==
The music video was directed by Stephen Lance and Mairi Cameron of Head Pictures. It features Miller-Heidke in a white room with a typewriter, a small and condensed room and a room with her trying to babysit a young boy. All of these rooms have numerous words written all over the walls. In the second half of the video, we see Miller-Heidke wearing a purple dress with flashing lights from Cameras.

Katemillerheidke words A live version of "Words" is featured on Miller-Heidke's 2009 live release, Live at The Hi-Fi. This version sees the song mashed up with Rage Against the Machine's 1992's Protest Anthem "Killing in the Name".

== Track listing ==
CD Single

1. "Words" (radio mix)
2. "Words" (album mix)
3. "We're Gonna Need Love"

== Charts ==
Chart (2007)	Peak position
Australia (ARIA)	43
