= BS El Ideologo =

BS El Ideólogo
- Also known as: BS El Ideólogo
- Born: Josué Abel Guzmán Cruz; June 16, 1991 (age 34)
- Origin: República Dominicana
- Genres: Reggaeton; Hip hop; Latin trap
- Occupations: Record producer; rapper
- Years active: 2009–present

Josué Abel Guzmán Cruz (born June 16, 1991, in Santo Domingo), artistically known as BS El Ideólogo, is a Dominican music producer and mixing engineer. He was part of the team that produced "El Manifiesto" by Henry G, a song that holds the Guinness World Record for the longest officially released song.

== Musical career ==
BS El Ideólogo has worked with numerous artists and producers on singles and albums, including: Franyer Beatz, DJ Conds, Aline Souza, Hache, El Jeffrey “El Canta Lindo,” San2bal, TwoVm Para Cristo, Genique, Misael J, Ross, Brayan Booz, Rubinsky, Dstar Lc, Skarlet, Saik, Promezzy, Xavier El Artista, Jhonfer Luis, Loammy Bido, Carasaf, Johan Paulino, Saddan El Manso, Sarah La Profeta, Raly Tamo Lindo, Ander Bock, Luigui López, Damenace, Junior Fabián, AQ The G.O.D, Da Hood, Nelly Nels, Juan Olivares “El Samurai,” among others.

In 2016, as part of the duo TwoVm Para Cristo, he released the album "Tour," whose main single was "Solo llora."

In 2018, he was nominated for the Iris Awards and the La Silla Awards with the song "La vida en el barrio" by Riva El Maestro, which was used as the soundtrack for the film "Voces de la Calle." The work won the award in the category of "Best Song."

That same year, he entered the Guinness World Records for his role as recording engineer on the song "El Manifiesto" by Henry G, which has a duration of 3 hours, 26 minutes, and 22 seconds, released and certified on November 30, 2017.

He currently works as a music producer and mixing engineer in stereo and Dolby Atmos formats, collaborating with brands, record labels, artists, and companies in the music industry.

== Discography ==
- 2009: Todo tiene su tiempo (as TwoVm Para Cristo)
- 2016: Tour (as TwoVm Para Cristo)

== Awards and Recognitions ==
- Iris Awards 2018 – Nominated for "La vida en el barrio."
- La Silla Awards 2018 – Winner in the category of Best Song for "La vida en el barrio."
- Guinness World Records (2018) – Recording engineer on "El Manifiesto" by Henry G, recognized as the longest officially released song.
- El Galardón Awards 2021 – Nominated as Urban Group or Duo alongside TwoVm Para Cristo.

== Personal life ==
BS El Ideólogo is married to Rayndira López, with whom he founded the company IdeologoArt, dedicated to multimedia production and audiovisual content creation. He is also a voting member of the Latin Grammy.
