= Vulgarnyj toNN =

Russian rap band

Vulgarnyj toNN Вульгарный тоNN
- Origin: Vladivostok, Russia
- Genres: Hip hop, rap
- Years active: 2005–2011
- Members: rAp; OST; CLassic (since 2006); Kore (since 2009); Ksandra (since 2006)
- Website: http://www.rapvladivostok.ru/

Vulgarnyj toNN (Russian: Вульгарный тоНН) was a Russian rap group based in Vladivostok. The group was composed of rAp, Ksandra, CLassic, Kore, and OST.

The band disbanded in 2011.

== History ==
Vulgarnyj toNN was established on July 27, 2005. Initially, the band consisted of rAp and OST. In 2006, Ksandra, a singer, and CLassic, an MC, joined the band. Kore became a member in 2009. In the same year, OST relocated to Moscow and collaborated with the bands Rynochnye Otnosheniya (Russian: Рыночные Отношения) and Chernaya Ekonomika (Russian: Чёрная Экономика). He released a solo album and multiple tracks in collaboration with those bands. Although OST's contributions to Vulgarnyj toNN became minimal, he is still officially considered a band member.

== Participations in rap-battles ==
=== Hip-Hop.Ru battles ===
Vulgarnyj toNN participated in several rap-battles, both as a team and individually. In 2007, the band reached the finals of the "5th command battle Hip-Hop.Ru," but was defeated by Mychanie Yagnyat (Russian: Мычание Ягнят), led by rapper Maestro A-Sid.

=== Team battle "Ostatsya v Zhivyh" ===
In 2007, Vulgarnyj toNN won the team battle "Ostatsya v Zhivyh" (Russian: Остаться в Живых, Russian for Lost), hosted by RapVladivostok.ru. This competition featured rap groups from the Primorsky Krai region of Russia.

=== InDaRnB.ru battles ===
Members of Vulgarnyj toNN participated in single rap battles organized by InDaRnB.ru. rAp and CLassic competed in the first battle, with Kore joining in the second. Among them, only CLassic achieved significant success. In the first InDaBattle, CLassic reached the semi-final but was defeated by the eventual winner, Chet, largely due to disagreements with one of the judges, David Nuriev (Russian: Давид Нуриев), known by the pseudonym Ptaha. However, CLassic then participated in the "InDaBattle" festival, which included winners and semifinalists of the battle, along with special guests.

CLassic also competed in the second InDaBattle. Despite new conflicts with the judges – the organizers of the battle, Snake, and rapper SD (Russian: СД) – CLassic reached the final but was defeated by 18-year-old Latvian rap artist Johnyboy, with a score of 5-2 in the final round.

== Awards ==
=== Hip-Hop.Ru Awards 2009 ===
Vulgarnyj toNN was awarded the title "Best rap-band/flava of 2009" (Russian: Лучшая группа/тусовка 2009) at the Hip-Hop.Ru Awards 2009. CLassic's solo album "Otvertka, vokrug kotoryj vraschaetsya mir," (Russian: Отвёртка, вокруг который вращается мир) secured the 2nd place in the category "Best Hip-Hop album of 2009" (Russian: Лучший Хип-Хоп альбом 2009), and Ksandra was named the 2nd best "Hip-Hop girl-singer in 2009" (Russian: Лучшая Хип-Хоп исполнительница 2009 года).

== Band members ==
- rAp — Aleksandr Epov (b. October 6, 1987, Ussuriysk)
- OST — Nikita Savinkin (b. March 14, 1987, Vladivostok)
- Ksandra — Aleksandra Shabalina (b. September 28, 1990, Vladivostok)
- CLassic — Viktor Stelmah (b. January 4, 1987, Vladivostok)
- Kore — Denis Kotelnikov (b. December 8, 1986, Vladivostok)

== Discography ==
=== Studio albums ===
- 2007: Vulgarnyj toNN — "Proba Pera" (Russian: "Проба пера", Russian for "First attempt at writing")

=== Mixtapes ===
- 2008: Vulgarnyj toNN — "Vulgarnyj KTO?" (Russian: "Вульгарный КТО?", Russian for "Vulgar WHO?")
- 2008: Kore — "The Phantom"

=== Solo albums ===
- 2008: Ksandra — "Maski" (Russian: "Маски", Russian for "Masks")
- 2009: CLassic — "Otvertka, Vokrug Kotoroy Vraschaetsya Mir" (Russian: "Отвертка, Вокруг Которой Вращается Мир", Russian for "Screw-driver Around Which the World Rotates")
- 2009: rAp, Kore — "Vidish Raznitsu?" (Russian: "Видишь Разницу?", Russian for "Do You See the Difference?")
- 2010: OST — "O.S.T. 2008-2010"
- 2010: Kore — "Zri v Koren" (Russian: "Зри в Koрeнь", Russian for "Get at the Root")

== Music videos ==
- 2009: "Kto, esli ne my? (Russian: Кто, если не мы?)" feat. GidroPonka, 228
- 2010: "My nauchim tebya, kak (Russian: Мы научим тебя, как?)" feat. FASTA
