= The Get Em Mamis =

American hip hop group

Get Em Mamis
- Genres: Alternative hip hop
- Occupation: rapping
- Years active: 2006–present
- Label: Unsigned
- Members: Fallon Anderson; Deenah Eaton

The Get Em Mamis is an American alternative hip hop group from the East Coast, United States. The duo consists of Roxzi and Symphony, both originally from Baltimore, Maryland. The Get Em Mamis first single "When You See Us" was featured on HBO hit series The Wire Season 4 and "The Ooh Ahh Song" was featured on HBO's The Wire Season 5". In 2008 Get Em Mamis single "Cold Summer" was ranked #83 in Rolling Stone magazine's Top 100 Singles of 2008. Get Em Mamis "Cold Summer" also received an impressive four stars in Rolling Stone's Download section in the May 2008 issue. They were the first female rap group from Baltimore, MD to be featured on Rolling Stone's Top 100 Singles.

== History ==
The Get Em Mamis was formed in 2006 by members Roxzi and Symphony. Although member Roxzi and Symphony were already creating music as solo artists, it was not until 2006 their single "When You See Us" was placed on HBO's series The Wire Season 4 that they gained national recognition. The following Season on HBO's series The Wire they were again featured on Season 5 with "The Ooh Ahh Song". Shortly after The Get Em Mamis were featured in Fader Magazine Gen F section, Vibe Magazine and Playboy magazine wrote about the group on their websites music section. Nonesuch Records (USA) released the soundtrack Beyond Hamsterdam: Baltimore tracks from The Wire” in February 2008 for HBO's series "The Wire". The Get Em Mamis "When You See Us" was the single.

In March 2009 The Get Em Mamis shot their second video for their single "Work". "Work" was directed by Alvin Gray, shot in Baltimore, and released in June 2009.

They released their first mixtape as a duo titled The Road To TerAwesome, the prequel to the LP TerAwesome in May 2009 which featured singles "Cold Summer", "When You See Us" and "They Jockin". In September 2009 The G.E.M.'s released one of their most notable projects to date titled TerAwesome via RCRDLBL.Com (A superlative the group created).

Baltimore Magazine and City Paper listed the Get Em Mami's TerAwesome as one of the best local releases in recent memory. Playboy Magazine also featured The Get Em Mamis single "Cold Summer" in the music section in September 2009.

In December 2009 Get Em Mamis opened for national recording artist Wale at The Sonar in Baltimore MD. In March 2010 Get Em Mamis were on the ticket for The Kidz in the Hall Crowd Control Tour Stop at The Rams Head in Baltimore.

== Discography ==
=== Albums ===
Year	Album		
Year	Album	U.S.	U.S.
2009	TerAwesome: Released: September 9, 2009; Label: Independent/Indie		

=== Featured singles ===
Year	Single	Artists	Peak chart positions					Album
Year	Single	Artists	AUS	UK	NL	AUT	SWI	Album
2008	"When You See Us"	The Get Em Mamis (featuring )	—	—	—	—	—	Beyond Hamsterdam
"—" denotes releases that did not chart

=== Mixtapes ===
- 2009: TerAwesome
- 2009: The Road To TerAwesome
- 2008: Cold Summer Campaign Old School Remixes
- 2008: Get Em Mamis : The Prequal
- 2007: HitsVille Gothan City Presents HitVillianz
- 2006: The Plague Remixes

=== Music videos ===
Year	Title	Director(s)
2009	"Work/Rock with me Featuring DJ Booman"	Mr. Alvin Gray
