= Unlogic Skill =

- Origin: Rijeka, Croatia
- Genres: Hip hop, Rap metal, Nu metal
- Years active: 1994–2002
- Labels: Dancing Bear (1997-2001)
- Past members: Damir Badurina; Neven Milutin; Dražen Baljak; Borna Mance; Vedran Vučković; Ivan Bačić; Ivo Milesunić

Unlogic Skill was a Croatian rap metal and Nu metal group from Rijeka. They were the first rap metal/nu metal group in the Balkans.

== History ==
Unlogic Skill was formed in 1994 by rappers Nitro Tha N (Neven) and Slow B (Bada) with guitarist Dražen Baljak. Their first demo tapes were released on compilation RijeKKKa's Most Wanted where they put three of their songs. During their first three years they toured around Croatia and Slovenia.

In 1997 Unlogic Skill won first place at a music festival for underground bands called Druga Pjesma '97 and the prize was getting signed by record label Dancing Bear. A year later they released their first album titled Zakon. The album gained positive reception for its unique sound and it is considered a classic in Rijeka's metal history.

2001 saw their second and last album Nelogični. The album was not a great success like its predecessor and had a bad promotion from its label. After the album Unlogic Skill disbanded.

== Style ==
Unlogic Skill didn't have a specific style, they used combinations of rap, rock, nu metal and rap metal. At first they rapped only in English later using combinations of English and Croatian before rapping only on Croatian.

== Reunions ==
The band had a short reunion while the filming of hip hop documentary Hip Hop priča iz Hrvatske in 2008. That same year, former font-man Damir Badurina committed suicide in his high club.

A year later Baljak and Milutin started throwing a yearly party in tribute to Damir Badurina called Slobodna Energija. In 2011 Unlogic Skill reunited at Slobodna Energija to pay tribute to their deceased friend Bada.

== Discography ==
Studio Albums:

- Zakon (1998)
- Nelogični (2001)

Compilations:

- RijeKKKa's Most Wanted (1995)
- RijeKKKa's Most Wanted (Tour '95) (1996)
- Ri Val - Ajmo Rijeka EP (1997)

Music videos:

- U.N.L.O.G.I.C. (1996)
- RI Val - Ajmo Rijeka (1997)
- Daj mi dim (1998)
- Nula (1998)
- Daj pive (2001)
- Obećanje, ludom radovanje (ft. El Bahattee) (2001)
- Groznica subotnje večeri (2001)

== Members ==
- Damir Badurina - Vocals (1994–2002)
- Neven Milutin - Vocals (1994–2002)
- Dražen Baljak - Guitar (1994–2002)
- Ivan Bačić - Bass (1994–1998)
- Vedran Vučković - Bass (1998–2002)
- Borna Mance - Drums (1994–2002)
