= 1000 Clowns =

American rapper

- Origin: Los Angeles, California
- Genres: Hip hop
- Years active: 1997–1999
- Label: Elektra
- Past members: Anita; DJ Dax; Mr. Pao; Kevi; Michelle; Scotty

1000 Clowns was a rap group most notable for two songs: "(Not the) Greatest Rapper", which appeared on the Good Burger soundtrack, and "Kitty Kat Max".

== History ==
The group's vocalists were sisters Anita and Michelle, and the band's leader, composer, lead singer and rapper was Kevi. DJ Mr. Pao was the turntablist, and he co-produced many of the songs. The other two members were DJ Dax and drummer Scotty.

== Freelance Bubblehead ==
The group released an album in 1999 titled Freelance Bubblehead, produced by Mickey Petralia. Neil Gladstone of CMJ New Music Monthly thought that the album was "easy on the ears" but formulaic.

=== Track listing ===
1. "Intro"
2. "(Not The) Greatest Rapper"
3. "Kitty Kat Max"
4. "I Love N.Y."
5. "Rainy Days"
6. "Favorite Things"
7. "Would you Be Mine? (KLD)"
8. "Everybody Smells So Different"
9. "Pug"
10. "Freelance Bubblehead"
11. "Thinkin'"
12. "Pretty Liar" (featuring Jude)

The single "(Not the) Greatest Rapper" charted at number 23 on the UK Singles Chart in 1999.
