= Blimpliza =

Hip-hop Band

blimpliza
- Origin: Turkey
- Genres: Triphop Electronica
- Years active: 2004–present
- Labels: Blimpliza
- Members: Seda Turan

Blimpliza is the first known Turkish Trip-hop band formed in 2004 by Seda Turan. Band supports various social themes and working with groups of independent activities.<

== Band members ==
- Seda Turan – Singer

== Discography ==
- Alenen (2009)
- Particles (2011)
- Sessions (2015)
