= Commodore 64 (band) =

American hip hop band

- Origin: Cherry Hill, New Jersey, U.S.
- Genres: Hip-hop, nerdcore hip-hop, geeksta rap
- Years active: 1992–present
- Label: Phatinum
- Members: Smart Money "Bass-I.Q."; Teddy Ruxpin (HMO); The Professa MC Squared; DJ Goodbeats

Commodore 64 (named after the 1980s computer of the same name) is an American hip hop group that was one of the pioneers of the hip hop music subgenre known as geeksta rap or nerdcore. Formed by four members of a math club and breakdancing troupe in 1992 at a concert in New Jersey, Commodore 64 was the first group to release a single produced entirely using an Apple Macintosh computer, "Horton Hears a Ho" in 1999.

Three of the four members of Commodore 64—Smart Money "Bass-I.Q." Teddy Ruxpin, HMO and The Professa MC Squared—are a mathematics professor, an economics writer and a deconstructionist philosopher, respectively. DJ Goodbeats, the "fourth member", is a computer.

Commodore 64 released its first album, K-Minus Initiative, in December 1999. As the first full-length nerdcore/geeksta rap record to be commercially released, it sold over 130,000 copies in its first three months of release. Their sound and beats have been likened to that of the early Beastie Boys.

The group is on their self-released, DIY, independently-based label, Phantium Records. They are not signed to any major label.

== Discography ==
- K-Minus Initiative (1999)
