= Por amor (Rafael Solano song) =

Single by Niní Cáffaro

from the album Por Amor
- Language: Spanish
- Released: November 1968
- Genre: Bolero
- Label: Gada
- Songwriter: Rafael Solano

Por amor is a 1968 bolero by Rafael Solano a native from the Dominican Republic. The song was first and most famously sung by Niní Cáffaro, and has been covered by Lucho Gatica, Marco Antonio Muñiz, Vicki Carr, Jon Secada, Gloria Estefan and Plácido Domingo.

The lyrics commence:

"Por amor, se han creado los hombres, en la faz de la tierra, por amor, hay quien haya querido, regalar una estrella,.."
