= Wax Murdaraz =

American hip hop group

- Wax Murdaraz in 2005

Background information
- Origin: St. Louis, Missouri
- Genres: Hip hop, Turntablism
- Years active: 1998–Present
- Label: Deep Krate Recordingz
- Members: B-Money; Charlie Chan Soprano; D-Ex; DJ K-Nine; DJ Professional; Furius "Iceman" Stylz; King IXL; Mocha Sunflower
- Website: WaxMurdaraz.com

Wax Murdaraz are a group of hip-hop musicians specialising in vinyl deejaying and music production. The group operates Wax Murdaraz Professional DJ Skool in St. Louis, Missouri, training people in hip-hop deejaying.

Founding members (Da Fly) D-Ex and DJ Professional (formerly DJ Finesse) recorded a number of tapes together in the late 1980s under the name Pest Realm, and released these independently from 1989 to 1995. The duo later adopted the alias "Wax Murdaraz" and in 1998 began constructing turntable "band" routines to present in a live format.

In 1999, D-Ex recruited deejays B-Money (who has since produced music for Jay-Z and 50 Cent), Furius "Iceman" Stylz, DJ K-Nine, Charlie Chan (former DJ for Da Brat; as of 2002, deejaying full-time for Darryl "DMC" McDaniels), and DJ Scratch protégé Mocha Sunflower. Wax Murdaraz went on to recruit battle legend King IXL in 2002.

Wax Murdaraz released an album in 2005 entitled City Ta City Killin' Spree which was executive produced jointly with scratch DJ legend Rob Swift, and released on their own record label Deep Krate Recordingz. In 2007, they started their own weekly radio show Deep Krate Radio on KDHX. The crew started broadcasting alternative uncensored versions of Deep Krate Radio shows on Ustream in 2009. In 2012, they released a free downloadable album entitled Voluntary Murda Over Tha Air. Later that same year, D-Ex began producing original music for ESPN in collaboration with long time music colleague Rob Swift.

== Discography ==
- City Ta City Killin' Spree (album, 2005)
- Voluntary Murda Over Tha Air (album, 2012)

== See also ==
- Turntablism
