= Proton (band) =

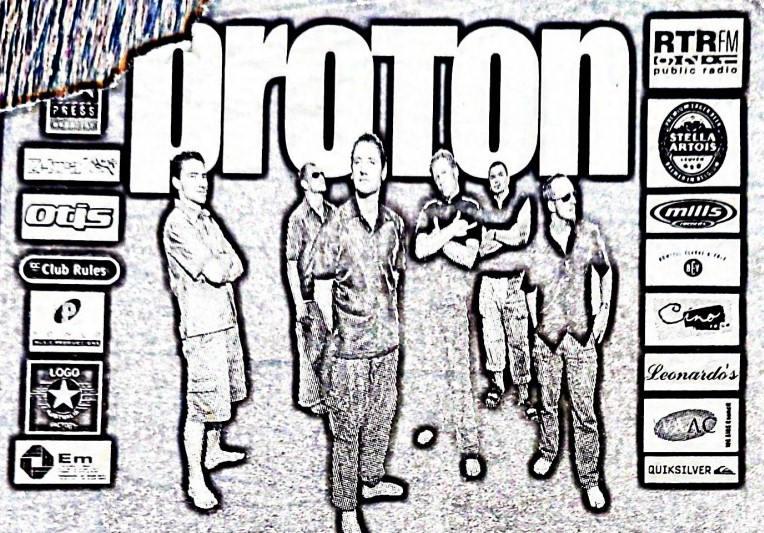

Background information
- Origin: Perth, Western Australia
- Genres: hip-hop; rock; funk; disco
- Members: Peter 'Buzzy' Miller; Tomas Shore; Jason McGann (John Butler Trio); Joe Scholz; Paul Malone; Wayne 'Ozzie' Rea aka MCO (ex Vitamin with John Butler); Chris Horan; Toby Gosfield; (son of Rueben "Lucky Oceans" Gosfield, Asleep at the Wheel); Jo 19; Duane Davidson; DJ KL

Proton is a "funk-disco-rock-hop" band from Perth. Members included Peter 'Buzzy' Miller, Tomas Shore, Jason McGann (John Butler Trio), Joe Scholz, Paul Malone, Wayne 'Ozzie' Rea aka MCO (ex Vitamin with John Butler), Chris Horan, Toby Gosfield, (son of Rueben "Lucky Oceans" Gosfield, Asleep at the Wheel), Jo 19, Duane Davidson, and DJ KL. Their single "The Wrong Beat"/"Throw Down" reached number 82 on the ARIA singles chart. Proton played the Big Day Out Festival in 2000.

== Discography ==
=== Live albums ===
- Live at Mojo's (2001)

=== Extended plays ===
- Here Beneath The Big Top (2000)

=== Singles ===
List of singles, with selected chart positions
Title	Year	Peak chart positions
Title	Year	AUS
"The Wrong Beat"/"Throw Down"	2001	82
