= High Rule =

- Origin: Chicago, Illinois, United States
- Genres: Indie; Hip hop leaning
- Years active: 2015–present
- Members: Buoy; Seis
- Website: highrule.bandcamp.com

High Rule is an American music duo from Chicago that gained popularity in March 2015 after reaching the #2 spot on the Spotify Global Viral chart with their song "Touch". "Touch" was featured on Spotify's popular New Music Tuesday playlist, as well as their Viral Hits playlist, both during the week of March 1, 2015. The two playlists at the time had over 600,000 combined followers. Individually, the artists are known as Buoy and Seis. The two artists attended college together at the University of Wisconsin. The group's name is derived from the mythical kingdom of Hyrule in The Legend of Zelda.
