= Balam Ajpu =

Guatemalan hip-hop group

- Origin: Guatemala
- Genres: Indigenous Rap, Hip hop
- Years active: 2012–present
- Labels: Mercury; Island
- Members: Tzutu Baktun Kan (Rene Dionisio); M.C.H.E. (Yefry Pacheco); Dr. Nativo (Juan Martínez)

Balam Ajpu is a Mayan hip-hop music group from Guatemala, whose music is often in mostly Tzʼutujil and Spanish along with other Mayan languages, including Quiché (Kʼicheʼ) and Kaqchikel. Their music is often about indigenous themes, struggles, spirituality and cosmovision. The group is produced by Danilo Rodríguez. The members also run a school, Casa Ahau Escuela de Hip Hop, in San Pedro La Laguna, which combines lessons in hip hop with efforts to revitalize Mayan languages among children.

== Members ==
Rene Dionisio, a.k.a. Tzutu Baktun Kan is the main rapper of the group. He had been an artist while doing rapping on the side since 2008. Dionisio grew up near Lake Atitlán speaking Tzʼutujil as his first language.

Pacheco, a.k.a. M.C.H.E. was born and raised in Guatemala City, but moved in the early 2000s to Quetzaltenango to pursue with a group called 13 Lunas, it is there where he meet Martínez a.k.a. Dr. Nativo, who has experience in making western-styled hip-hop music.
