= Arabian Knightz =

Egyptian hip hop trio

- Born: Karim Adel, Hesham Abed and Ehab Adel; Cairo, Egypt
- Origin: Cairo, Egypt
- Genre: Hip hop
- Occupations: Musician, music producer
- Years active: 2005–present
- Label: Arab League Records
- Website: https://www.facebook.com/ARABIANKNIGHTZ.AK

Arabian Knightz is an Egyptian hip hop trio from Cairo, Egypt that formed in 2005 consisting of Rush (Karim Adel), Sphinx (Hesham Abed), and E-Money (Ehab Adel). They are known for releasing "Rebel" featuring Lauryn Hill, one of the first songs released from Egypt following the internet censorship during the Egyptian revolution of 2011.

== Formation ==
Arabian Knightz formed in 2005 after current group members, Karim Adel a.k.a. Rush, and Hesham Abed a.k.a. Sphinx, met in Cairo after a hip hop concert. The last member, Ehab Adel a.k.a. E-Money, joined the group after collaborating with Rush on hip hop instrumentals and engaging in freestyle rap.

== "Rebel" during the Egyptian Revolution ==
The Arabian Knightz gained notoriety following the release of their single "Rebel feat. Lauryn Hill" the day internet was restored in Egypt. "Rebel" was finished during the revolution, but the group was told by the government to not release the song due to its lyrics being rebellious.

Due to the protests in Egypt, the government blocked the country's internet. In early February 2011, the internet was restored and the Arabian Knightz were one of the first Egyptian artists to release a song online. The website they released "Rebel" on was mideasttunes.com, a platform for underground musicians in the Middle East to release their music.

== Themes and reception of "Rebel" ==
According to Sphinx, the message of "Rebel" is to stand up and rebel against the realities of Egyptian life. He states this can be done if individuals seek to "rebel against oppression, to rebel against the divide and conquer of our society, and to rebel against the dumbing of our people. As humans we all need to stand up against such things whenever we see them. And, as Muslims we are demanded to do so by God. We all need to do what we can to speak out against the wrongs of the world."

Following the release of "Rebel," many news outlets such as Rolling Stone, Cairo West/East magazine, The Wall Street Journal, CBC News and The Washington Post composed write-ups on the song and its impact on Egyptians and the Egyptian revolution of 2011.

Vancouver Media Co-op states in an article that the song was the anthem of the Egyptian revolution and that it stood "as an emotionally empowering song that captures the heart, courage & spirit of the Egyptian people currently embattled in a Revolution against an oppressive leadership."

DUBCNN states in an article that "Arabian Knightz have been considered the Public Enemy or NWA of Egypt. Their music has been the theme of the Egyptian Revolution, and as active participants in the Tahrir Square's revolution, the trio's album has been long over due."

== Debut album ==
The Arabian Knightz released their first LP "Uknighted State of Arabia," on 21 August 2012 following the Egyptian revolution of 2011 and the success of "Rebel". The release was possible due to gaining a "secured international distribution for the album through iTunes and Amazon" and also through "a guerrilla distribution network to provide physical copies of the record to fans inside Egypt." Following the release, the album reached the top 200 on iTunes.

== Discography ==
- Uknighted State of Arabia (2012)
