= TwoVm Para Cristo =

Christian musicians

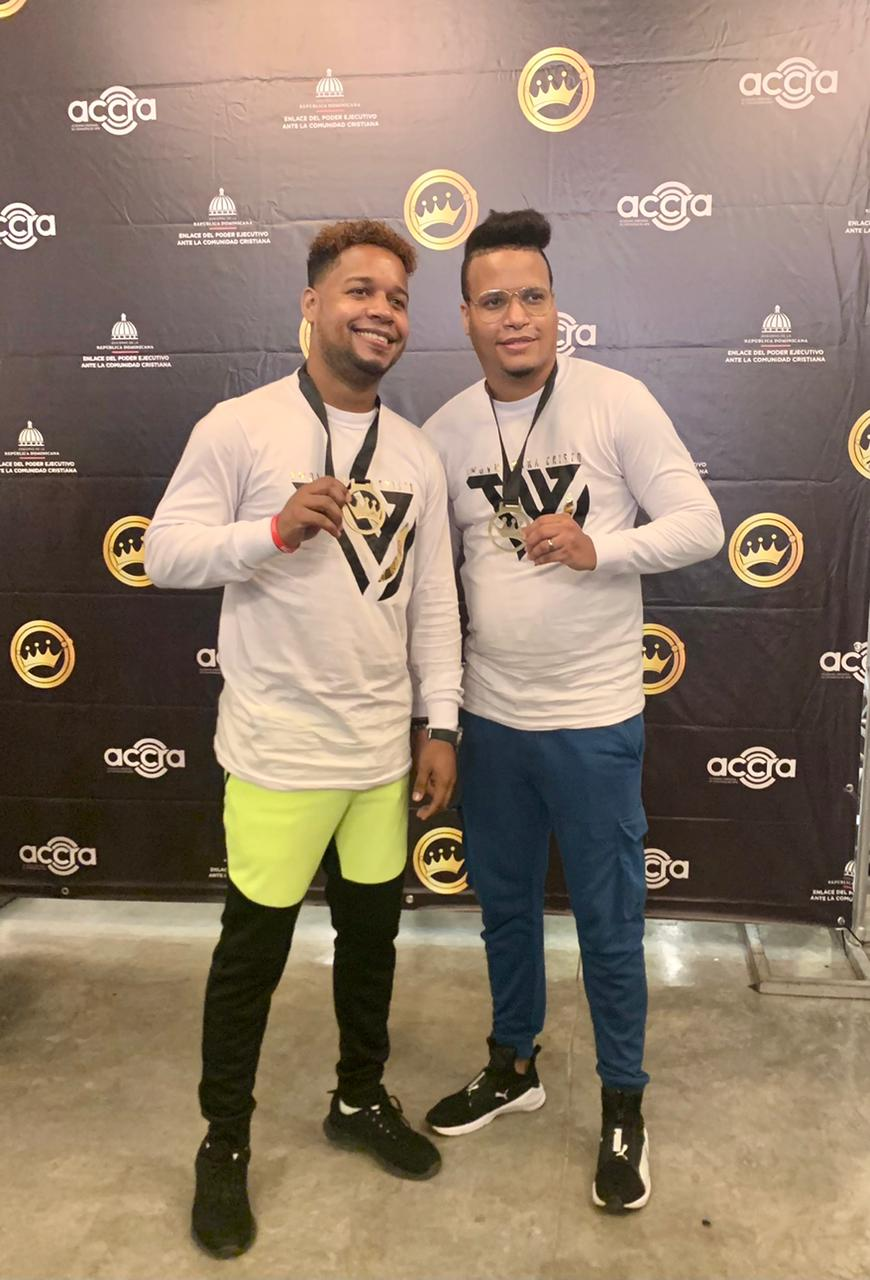
- Josué Guzmán (left) and Ramón Guzmán (right), 2021

Background information
- Also known as: TwoVm
- Origin: República Dominicana
- Genres: Reggaeton; Hip hop; Latin trap
- Years active: 2009–present
- Members: Josué Abel Guzmán Cruz; Ramón Emilio Guzmán Cruz
- Website: https://twovmparacristo.com/

TwoVm Para Cristo is a duo of urban music, originally from the Dominican Republic, made up of the Guzmán brothers, Josué and Ramón. His nickname TwoVm (Dos Vencedores Más) means "Two More Victors for Christ".

They began their musical career in 2009, releasing two albums, "Todo Tiene Su Tiempo" and "Tour", being nominated for the "Best Urban Duo" in El Galardón awards in 2021.

== Musical career ==
The duo, originally from Santo Domingo, was created and founded by Josué Guzmán and Ramón Guzmán in 2009. Before their first production, the duo shared their music in local concerts alongside emerging artists, such as 'Qué tu va hace papa' with Raynelyz López and 'Eres tú' with Rivelking Jiménez. "Todo Tiene Su Tiempo" (in English, "Everything has its time") in the same year, was their first studio album, full of a Christian message, and tropical rhythms, with this album and in the same year they made their first tour of South America.

In 2016, TwoVm Para Cristo released the album "Tour", an album of 10 songs and 3 videos recorded in the Dominican Republic, and promoted with the single "Solo Llora". The artists Lyrical Colimbo and GL Layu participated in this. From this production the single "Estoy bien" stands out, which they recorded to the rhythm of Merengue.

In the 2021 El Galardón Awards, TwoVm were nominated as a Group or Urban Duo.

Currently, they are working on their third studio album called “Electronic”, a musical proposal that has the singles “Vida”, “Para Gozar”, “Poderoso Gigante” and “La reversa”, which is one of the most requested songs. on the Christian radio station Radio Ven.

== Discography ==
- 2009: Todo tiene su tiempo
- 2016: Tour
- TBA: Electronic
