= Archean Soundtrack =

- Band logo

Background information
- Origin: London, England
- Genres: Rap rock, alternative rock, hip hop
- Years active: 2009–present
- Members: Roger Parkins, Darren Gosling, Josh Carter, Jonny Hopwood, Craig Mitchell
- Past members: Nasi Voutsas
- Website: www.facebook.com/archeansoundtrack

Archean Soundtrack are a British rock/hip hop band from London, England. It was formed by actors from the accredited East 15 Acting School in 2009. Archean Soundtrack are best known for their single Reach, the music video of which was directed by Duncan Guymer, who oversaw the viral marketing videos for Thorpe Park's ride, "The Swarm". This single was chosen by BBC Essex's Ollie Winiberg for broadcast on BBC Music Introducing in 2012. The band were also finalists in the sixth year of the widely acknowledged Live and Unsigned competition in the UK.

== History ==
Archean Soundtrack was formed in 2009, when actors Roger Parkins and Josh Carter met whilst working on Arthur Miller's play All My Sons at London's East 15 Acting School. Together with fellow actors Darren Gosling, Nasi Voutsas and Craig Mitchell, the group began to experiment with varying musical styles and genres. Beginning with the exploration of funk and rock, the introduction of Craig Mitchell brought about a shift towards hip hop.

In summer 2010, the band released their first EP, Where Are the Prodigal Sons. However, their most recognized single to date has been Reach. Released in early 2011, the music video was subsequently made by Duncan Guymer, who worked as director for the viral marketing video for Thorpe Park's ride, "The Swarm".

In 2012, Reach was chosen by BBC Essex's Ollie Winiberg to be broadcast on BBC Music Introducing, a showcase for unsigned, self signed and other emerging musical talent, primarily from the UK.

Later that year, the band entered the annual Live and Unsigned competition. The talent contest has previously been judged by Noddy Holder, Annie Nightingale, Mark Hill and BBC Radio 1 DJ Ras Kwame. Archean Soundtrack made it to the finals, but in the end were beaten by CoCo and the Butterfields.

Archean Soundtrack also competed in McFly's Battle of the Bands contest, in which the winners would go on to play in McFly's 2012 tour Keep Calm & Play Louder.
