= Rafael Solano =

Dominican Republic musician

Rafael Solano Sánchez (born 10 April 1931 in San Felipe de Puerto Plata, in the Dominican Republic) is a Dominican pianist, songwriter, composer, arranger, author, and former Dominican ambassador to UNESCO. He is credited with writing over a hundred songs of various genres that include romantic, folk, as well as choral, religious, and merengue music. His most famous love song, "Por Amor", has been translated into several languages and performed by renowned artists, such as Marco Antonio Muñiz, Vicki Carr, Jon Secada, the Mariachi Vargas, and Plácido Domingo.

== Discography ==
- His Music and Piano Instrumental (1960)
- Mucha Música, Mucho Ritmo, Mucho Sabor y Todo... Por Amor (1960)
- Perdidamente Enamorado Vol. 1 (1965)
- Amorama: Su Piano y Su Música Instrumental En Carnegie Hall (1969)
- A Bailar la Mangulina (1970)
- Internacional (1970)
- Está Bien (1970)
- La Batuta (1972)
- Solano En Navidad (1972)
- Lo Mejor de Rafael Solano (1972)
- Váyase En Paz Compadre (1972)
- Ha Llegado la Hora del Moro (1973)
- Siempre Arriba (1973)
- Lo Más de Rafael Solano y Sus Amigos (1974)
- La Soga (1975)
- Esta Es Mi Orquesta (1975)
- Dominicanita (1976)
- Fiesta Fabulosa (1976)
- Merengue a Piano (1977)
- Salsa y Merengue (1977)
- Super Hits (1977)
- Esta Es Mi Orquesta! (1980)
- Lo Pidieron...Aquí lo Tienen (1980)
- Solano...Sabroso...! (1981)
- Su Compa (1982)
- Los Galleros (1982)
- Merengues (1987)
- Ritmo y Amor (1989)
- 14 Grandes Éxitos de Rafael Solano (1993)
- Colección (1994)
- Canciones Dominicanas En Concierto (1996)
- Merengues Navideños (1998)
- Merengue de Siempre (1998)
- El Disco de Oro (2000)
- Recordando el Ayer: Merengues Dominicanos Vol. 1 (2000)
- Reserva Musical (2008)
