= Intik =

Algerian musical group

Intik (Arabic: أنتيك; pronounced: [æn.ti:k]) is an Algerian rap/hip hop group consisting of four artists. The group raps in both Darija (Algerian Arabic creole) and French and often drawing upon the violence all four experienced while growing up in turbulent Algeria during the 80s and 90s. The name Intik in Algerian dialect means "everything's going great", which is ironic considering the Algerian political unrest which the Intik focuses upon. Intik's front man is the rapper Youss (short for Youssef) with the other members being Reda, Samir, and Nabil.

== Founding ==
The four started rapping after experiencing the violence in Algeria in 1988, specifically at one protest in which the military opened fire on the assembled crowd of Algerians which included the to-be members of Intik. In an interview Youss discusses the moment when he knew he wanted to rap, "Because I saw [the events in Algeria October 5th, 1988]... I was scared I saw virulent violence with a capital 'V'. It was state terrorism as it's called. A military that shoots the people. And I witnessed it. I even have scars from that... I was young in '88... beaten by the police." This state-terrorism inspired Youss to write about the government. He asked questions and he states that "the more you asked questions, the more you discover. And when you didn't ask questions, you discover nothing. As soon as you begin to reflect, you begin to have answers." It's from these answers that he got his lyrics from and then expressed it in rap.

The group Intik was founded when Algerian artist Youss (who was determined to leave Algeria at the time) joined with the group and just "buckled down and worked". At the time, Youss was actually just trying to help these men "make a better life for themselves" by getting out of Algeria and heading to France. When Youss knew that he would be coming to France, he said that he wasn't alone, and that he was a part of a group "just to get the visas". The group rapped in both French and Arabic. In terms of obtaining rap to listen to when Youss was just beginning his rapping career, he said, "it was really difficult but we had ways of getting hold of the music. There was always someone in England or in France who'd send us cassettes". The group was discovered by a successful French rap group IAM (band) after they heard them at a festival. Due to the talent, a few well known artists wanted to be featured on their first album; however Intik wanted to create their own success without using already famous artists to help them.

== Artistic Output ==
Youss says the signing of the group Intik with Saint George/Sony records was due to a song he wrote by himself before he had ever met the group. The song is titled, "Va Le Dire A Ta Mere, Va Le Dire A Ton Pere". That was the first song he recorded by himself, and then performed it later with the group. He claims that ultimately, that song is the reason Intik was signed. Youss claims that the group's music is "a mixture of Chaâbi the traditional Algerian music, of Reggae, a bit of groove, and a bit of Raï too. The group, which fuses Western and Algerian culture, made two albums together, the self titled "Intik" in 1999 and Victoire in 2001, and also performed on a tour. After these accomplishments, Youss "wanted to do his own thing", claiming that he "couldn't go and do a third album because it was too draining". Accordingly, Youcef claims that he was responsible for "everything" involved with putting together the two albums, which included writing the songs and managing the group. Youcef claims that the message of the group is a call to the people for peace.

== Resistance ==
Intik was subjected to some resistance from the Algerian government during their time in Algeria. For example, Youss claims that Intik was "prohibited from appearing on TV for a short while" because some of the songs had lyrics that expressed political opinions that were controversial. Youss goes on to explain that some of these songs "weren't even put on the album that was released in Algeria" because "the producer was afraid to release them".

== Discography ==
- Intik (1999)
- La Victorie (2001)
