= MBS (hip-hop) =

MBS, short for Le Micro Brise Le Silence (the microphone breaks the silence) is a rap group formed in 1988 in Algeria. They sing in Arabic, Kabyle, and French, and are led by Rabah Ourrad. Their lyrics mostly speak out against the Algerian government.

== Discography ==
- 1997, Ouled al Bahdja (Children of the Radiant One)
- 1998, Hbibti Aouama (My Lover Is a Good Swimmer)
- 1999, Le Micro Brise Le Silence (The Mic Breaks the Silence)
- 2001, Wellew (They Have Returned)
- 2005, Maquis Bla Sleh (Marquis Without Weapons)

=== Rabah (solo) ===
- 2002, Galouli (They Told Me)
- 2003, Djabha gagant (Winning Front)
- 2004, President
- 2011, Dernier Cri (Last Cry)
