= List of minor planets: 650001–651000 =

The following is a partial list of minor planets, running from minor-planet number 650001 through 651000, inclusive. The primary data for this and other partial lists is based on JPL's "Small-Body Orbital Elements" and data available from the Minor Planet Center. Critical list information is also provided by the MPC, unless otherwise specified from Lowell Observatory. A detailed description of the table's columns and additional sources are given on the main page including a complete list of every page in this series, and a statistical break-up on the dynamical classification of minor planets.

Also see the summary list of all named bodies in numerical and alphabetical order, and the corresponding naming citations for the number range of this particular list. New namings may only be added to this list after official publication, as the preannouncement of names is condemned by the Working Group for Small Bodies Nomenclature of the International Astronomical Union.

Near-Earth obj.	MBA (inner)	MBA (outer)	Centaur
Mars-crosser	MBA (middle)	Jupiter trojan	Trans-Neptunian obj.
Unclassified

== 650001–650100 ==
Designation			Discovery			Properties		Ref
Permanent	Provisional	Named after	Date	Site	Discoverer(s)	Category	Diam.	Ref
650001	2011 UN_{345}	—	September 12, 2007	Mount Lemmon	Mount Lemmon Survey	V	650 m	MPC · JPL
650002	2011 UG_{352}	—	October 20, 2011	Kitt Peak	Spacewatch	·	2.9 km	MPC · JPL
650003	2011 US_{354}	—	October 20, 2011	Mount Lemmon	Mount Lemmon Survey	·	1.8 km	MPC · JPL
650004	2011 UK_{355}	—	September 24, 2011	Haleakala	Pan-STARRS 1	·	2.6 km	MPC · JPL
650005	2011 UP_{358}	—	September 29, 2011	Mayhill-ISON	L. Elenin	·	2.6 km	MPC · JPL
650006	2011 UV_{361}	—	October 21, 2011	Mount Lemmon	Mount Lemmon Survey	·	760 m	MPC · JPL
650007	2011 UC_{364}	—	September 30, 2006	Mount Lemmon	Mount Lemmon Survey	·	2.1 km	MPC · JPL
650008	2011 UG_{364}	—	January 18, 2005	Kitt Peak	Spacewatch	·	1.1 km	MPC · JPL
650009	2011 UH_{364}	—	October 22, 2011	Mount Lemmon	Mount Lemmon Survey	·	2.2 km	MPC · JPL
650010	2011 UA_{365}	—	December 12, 2006	Kitt Peak	Spacewatch	THM	2.2 km	MPC · JPL
650011	2011 UN_{366}	—	September 20, 2007	Kitt Peak	Spacewatch	·	920 m	MPC · JPL
650012	2011 UD_{367}	—	May 1, 2006	Kitt Peak	Spacewatch	·	1.0 km	MPC · JPL
650013	2011 UK_{367}	—	October 22, 2011	Mount Lemmon	Mount Lemmon Survey	EOS	1.5 km	MPC · JPL
650014	2011 UH_{371}	—	October 23, 2011	Mount Lemmon	Mount Lemmon Survey	·	2.5 km	MPC · JPL
650015	2011 UT_{381}	—	July 30, 2005	Palomar	NEAT	·	2.4 km	MPC · JPL
650016	2011 UC_{384}	—	October 24, 2011	Haleakala	Pan-STARRS 1	V	710 m	MPC · JPL
650017	2011 UD_{384}	—	October 24, 2011	Haleakala	Pan-STARRS 1	·	2.6 km	MPC · JPL
650018	2011 UR_{386}	—	October 25, 2011	Haleakala	Pan-STARRS 1	·	2.3 km	MPC · JPL
650019	2011 UT_{388}	—	October 25, 2011	Haleakala	Pan-STARRS 1	·	2.1 km	MPC · JPL
650020	2011 UW_{388}	—	October 25, 2011	Haleakala	Pan-STARRS 1	·	1.6 km	MPC · JPL
650021	2011 UO_{390}	—	October 30, 2007	Mount Lemmon	Mount Lemmon Survey	NYS	870 m	MPC · JPL
650022	2011 UR_{392}	—	April 5, 2008	Mount Lemmon	Mount Lemmon Survey	·	2.0 km	MPC · JPL
650023	2011 UD_{393}	—	October 28, 2011	Mount Lemmon	Mount Lemmon Survey	V	680 m	MPC · JPL
650024	2011 UQ_{397}	—	September 23, 2011	Haleakala	Pan-STARRS 1	TIR	2.0 km	MPC · JPL
650025	2011 UM_{404}	—	October 30, 2011	Kitt Peak	Spacewatch	·	2.3 km	MPC · JPL
650026	2011 US_{404}	—	October 3, 2011	XuYi	PMO NEO Survey Program	MAS	570 m	MPC · JPL
650027	2011 UG_{406}	—	January 16, 2005	Mauna Kea	Veillet, C.	NYS	1.1 km	MPC · JPL
650028	2011 UN_{407}	—	January 10, 2007	Mount Lemmon	Mount Lemmon Survey	·	3.2 km	MPC · JPL
650029	2011 UC_{408}	—	September 23, 2011	Haleakala	Pan-STARRS 1	·	1.7 km	MPC · JPL
650030	2011 UK_{408}	—	September 22, 2011	Catalina	CSS	·	3.2 km	MPC · JPL
650031	2011 UJ_{413}	—	October 23, 2011	Haleakala	Pan-STARRS 1	SDO	162 km	MPC · JPL
650032	2011 UW_{415}	—	October 20, 2011	Mount Lemmon	Mount Lemmon Survey	V	570 m	MPC · JPL
650033	2011 UG_{416}	—	December 13, 2006	Kitt Peak	Spacewatch	VER	2.2 km	MPC · JPL
650034	2011 UM_{416}	—	October 24, 2011	Haleakala	Pan-STARRS 1	·	2.3 km	MPC · JPL
650035	2011 UP_{418}	—	October 26, 2011	Haleakala	Pan-STARRS 1	·	2.8 km	MPC · JPL
650036	2011 UW_{418}	—	October 23, 2011	Kitt Peak	Spacewatch	MAS	590 m	MPC · JPL
650037	2011 UE_{419}	—	October 30, 2011	Mount Lemmon	Mount Lemmon Survey	NYS	880 m	MPC · JPL
650038	2011 UZ_{423}	—	October 24, 2011	Haleakala	Pan-STARRS 1	·	1.6 km	MPC · JPL
650039	2011 UL_{426}	—	November 21, 2006	Mount Lemmon	Mount Lemmon Survey	·	2.4 km	MPC · JPL
650040	2011 UX_{433}	—	October 18, 2011	Kitt Peak	Spacewatch	·	1.3 km	MPC · JPL
650041	2011 UA_{435}	—	February 12, 2013	Haleakala	Pan-STARRS 1	·	2.5 km	MPC · JPL
650042	2011 UD_{438}	—	December 15, 2006	Mount Lemmon	Mount Lemmon Survey	VER	2.4 km	MPC · JPL
650043	2011 UN_{448}	—	October 22, 2011	Mount Lemmon	Mount Lemmon Survey	MAS	510 m	MPC · JPL
650044	2011 UP_{448}	—	October 24, 2011	Haleakala	Pan-STARRS 1	·	790 m	MPC · JPL
650045	2011 UB_{449}	—	October 23, 2011	Mount Lemmon	Mount Lemmon Survey	·	2.5 km	MPC · JPL
650046	2011 UN_{449}	—	October 18, 2011	Mount Lemmon	Mount Lemmon Survey	·	2.3 km	MPC · JPL
650047	2011 UO_{449}	—	October 18, 2011	Kitt Peak	Spacewatch	·	2.3 km	MPC · JPL
650048	2011 UL_{451}	—	October 19, 2011	Haleakala	Pan-STARRS 1	·	2.8 km	MPC · JPL
650049	2011 UN_{451}	—	October 19, 2011	Mount Lemmon	Mount Lemmon Survey	·	2.6 km	MPC · JPL
650050	2011 UO_{451}	—	August 2, 2016	Haleakala	Pan-STARRS 1	·	2.5 km	MPC · JPL
650051	2011 UR_{451}	—	October 30, 2011	Kitt Peak	Spacewatch	URS	2.8 km	MPC · JPL
650052	2011 US_{451}	—	October 26, 2011	Haleakala	Pan-STARRS 1	·	2.8 km	MPC · JPL
650053	2011 UP_{470}	—	October 26, 2011	Haleakala	Pan-STARRS 1	PHO	820 m	MPC · JPL
650054	2011 US_{470}	—	October 23, 2011	Mount Lemmon	Mount Lemmon Survey	·	950 m	MPC · JPL
650055	2011 UV_{473}	—	October 23, 2011	Haleakala	Pan-STARRS 1	·	2.4 km	MPC · JPL
650056	2011 UU_{474}	—	October 21, 2011	Kitt Peak	Spacewatch	·	2.3 km	MPC · JPL
650057	2011 UR_{476}	—	October 24, 2011	Haleakala	Pan-STARRS 1	VER	2.0 km	MPC · JPL
650058	2011 UO_{481}	—	October 20, 2011	Mount Lemmon	Mount Lemmon Survey	·	1.0 km	MPC · JPL
650059	2011 UQ_{486}	—	October 26, 2011	Haleakala	Pan-STARRS 1	·	930 m	MPC · JPL
650060	2011 UV_{489}	—	October 25, 2011	Haleakala	Pan-STARRS 1	·	2.1 km	MPC · JPL
650061	2011 UC_{490}	—	October 25, 2011	Haleakala	Pan-STARRS 1	·	880 m	MPC · JPL
650062	2011 UM_{493}	—	October 23, 2011	Haleakala	Pan-STARRS 1	·	2.4 km	MPC · JPL
650063	2011 UY_{493}	—	October 23, 2011	Mount Lemmon	Mount Lemmon Survey	HYG	2.1 km	MPC · JPL
650064	2011 US_{494}	—	October 23, 2011	Kitt Peak	Spacewatch	·	2.1 km	MPC · JPL
650065	2011 UZ_{494}	—	July 7, 2010	Mount Lemmon	Mount Lemmon Survey	·	2.2 km	MPC · JPL
650066	2011 UO_{499}	—	October 26, 2011	Haleakala	Pan-STARRS 1	·	1.8 km	MPC · JPL
650067	2011 VO_{3}	—	January 10, 2007	Kitt Peak	Spacewatch	·	2.1 km	MPC · JPL
650068	2011 VQ_{3}	—	October 4, 2002	Palomar	NEAT	·	2.5 km	MPC · JPL
650069	2011 VS_{3}	—	March 30, 2008	Kitt Peak	Spacewatch	EUP	3.0 km	MPC · JPL
650070	2011 VZ_{3}	—	September 19, 2011	Haleakala	Pan-STARRS 1	·	2.5 km	MPC · JPL
650071	2011 VH_{10}	—	April 18, 2009	Kitt Peak	Spacewatch	·	2.6 km	MPC · JPL
650072	2011 VX_{12}	—	May 7, 2010	Mount Lemmon	Mount Lemmon Survey	(5)	880 m	MPC · JPL
650073	2011 VH_{15}	—	October 30, 2011	Kitt Peak	Spacewatch	·	2.7 km	MPC · JPL
650074	2011 VC_{20}	—	October 25, 2011	Haleakala	Pan-STARRS 1	·	1.3 km	MPC · JPL
650075	2011 VB_{21}	—	November 8, 2011	Haleakala	Pan-STARRS 1	PHO	1.0 km	MPC · JPL
650076	2011 VN_{21}	—	February 8, 2008	Mount Lemmon	Mount Lemmon Survey	·	1.8 km	MPC · JPL
650077	2011 VH_{28}	—	October 2, 2016	Mount Lemmon	Mount Lemmon Survey	·	2.6 km	MPC · JPL
650078	2011 VC_{30}	—	November 3, 2011	Mount Lemmon	Mount Lemmon Survey	EOS	1.4 km	MPC · JPL
650079	2011 VG_{30}	—	November 2, 2011	Mount Lemmon	Mount Lemmon Survey	·	2.7 km	MPC · JPL
650080	2011 VO_{30}	—	November 3, 2011	Mount Lemmon	Mount Lemmon Survey	·	2.9 km	MPC · JPL
650081	2011 VA_{31}	—	November 2, 2011	Mount Lemmon	Mount Lemmon Survey	LIX	2.3 km	MPC · JPL
650082	2011 VE_{35}	—	November 3, 2011	Kitt Peak	Spacewatch	VER	2.3 km	MPC · JPL
650083	2011 WO	—	November 16, 2011	Mount Lemmon	Mount Lemmon Survey	THM	2.0 km	MPC · JPL
650084	2011 WZ_{4}	—	October 5, 2002	Socorro	LINEAR	·	2.0 km	MPC · JPL
650085	2011 WB_{8}	—	October 7, 2005	Kitt Peak	Spacewatch	·	2.2 km	MPC · JPL
650086	2011 WJ_{8}	—	March 10, 2008	Kitt Peak	Spacewatch	·	2.2 km	MPC · JPL
650087	2011 WW_{13}	—	September 20, 2003	Kitt Peak	Spacewatch	·	1.2 km	MPC · JPL
650088	2011 WC_{14}	—	October 21, 2011	Mount Lemmon	Mount Lemmon Survey	·	2.7 km	MPC · JPL
650089	2011 WX_{18}	—	October 17, 2011	Kitt Peak	Spacewatch	·	2.7 km	MPC · JPL
650090	2011 WF_{19}	—	November 4, 2005	Mount Lemmon	Mount Lemmon Survey	·	2.4 km	MPC · JPL
650091	2011 WF_{22}	—	October 10, 2007	Mount Lemmon	Mount Lemmon Survey	·	1.1 km	MPC · JPL
650092	2011 WF_{24}	—	December 19, 2003	Kitt Peak	Spacewatch	·	750 m	MPC · JPL
650093	2011 WH_{26}	—	September 13, 2007	Mount Lemmon	Mount Lemmon Survey	·	1 km	MPC · JPL
650094	2011 WQ_{26}	—	November 18, 2011	Mount Lemmon	Mount Lemmon Survey	·	2.1 km	MPC · JPL
650095	2011 WN_{28}	—	October 19, 2011	Kitt Peak	Spacewatch	·	1.0 km	MPC · JPL
650096	2011 WM_{33}	—	November 18, 2011	Mount Lemmon	Mount Lemmon Survey	(5)	750 m	MPC · JPL
650097	2011 WX_{33}	—	November 15, 2006	Mount Lemmon	Mount Lemmon Survey	·	2.2 km	MPC · JPL
650098	2011 WZ_{36}	—	August 28, 2005	Kitt Peak	Spacewatch	·	2.1 km	MPC · JPL
650099	2011 WF_{37}	—	November 15, 2011	Mount Lemmon	Mount Lemmon Survey	·	2.2 km	MPC · JPL
650100	2011 WC_{45}	—	November 23, 2011	Mount Lemmon	Mount Lemmon Survey	·	2.4 km	MPC · JPL

== 650101–650200 ==
back to top

Designation			Discovery			Properties		Ref
Permanent	Provisional	Named after	Date	Site	Discoverer(s)	Category	Diam.	Ref
650101	2011 WL_{48}	—	November 22, 2011	Mount Lemmon	Mount Lemmon Survey	·	1.2 km	MPC · JPL
650102	2011 WH_{52}	—	October 8, 2007	Mount Lemmon	Mount Lemmon Survey	·	1.1 km	MPC · JPL
650103	2011 WD_{54}	—	November 24, 2011	Haleakala	Pan-STARRS 1	·	2.9 km	MPC · JPL
650104	2011 WX_{57}	—	October 26, 2011	Haleakala	Pan-STARRS 1	·	1.0 km	MPC · JPL
650105	2011 WK_{58}	—	April 4, 2005	Mount Lemmon	Mount Lemmon Survey	·	1.1 km	MPC · JPL
650106	2011 WO_{62}	—	November 2, 2011	Mount Lemmon	Mount Lemmon Survey	VER	2.2 km	MPC · JPL
650107	2011 WF_{63}	—	November 24, 2011	Mount Lemmon	Mount Lemmon Survey	·	840 m	MPC · JPL
650108	2011 WW_{63}	—	October 20, 2011	Mount Lemmon	Mount Lemmon Survey	·	2.8 km	MPC · JPL
650109	2011 WP_{64}	—	October 31, 2005	Mount Lemmon	Mount Lemmon Survey	LIX	2.6 km	MPC · JPL
650110	2011 WA_{65}	—	November 17, 2011	Mount Lemmon	Mount Lemmon Survey	·	2.5 km	MPC · JPL
650111	2011 WG_{65}	—	November 20, 2005	Catalina	CSS	T_{j} (2.98)	4.3 km	MPC · JPL
650112	2011 WC_{69}	—	October 10, 2007	Mount Lemmon	Mount Lemmon Survey	·	840 m	MPC · JPL
650113	2011 WG_{74}	—	November 28, 2011	Piszkés-tető	K. Sárneczky, A. Szing	·	1.1 km	MPC · JPL
650114	2011 WT_{76}	—	October 25, 2011	Haleakala	Pan-STARRS 1	·	2.6 km	MPC · JPL
650115	2011 WZ_{94}	—	September 29, 2011	Mount Lemmon	Mount Lemmon Survey	·	2.2 km	MPC · JPL
650116	2011 WF_{98}	—	November 24, 2011	Haleakala	Pan-STARRS 1	·	3.1 km	MPC · JPL
650117	2011 WQ_{98}	—	November 3, 2005	Kitt Peak	Spacewatch	·	2.9 km	MPC · JPL
650118	2011 WX_{99}	—	March 11, 2005	Mount Lemmon	Mount Lemmon Survey	KON	2.1 km	MPC · JPL
650119	2011 WN_{113}	—	August 27, 2005	Palomar	NEAT	·	2.5 km	MPC · JPL
650120	2011 WO_{113}	—	November 16, 2011	Kitt Peak	Spacewatch	L4	9.9 km	MPC · JPL
650121	2011 WQ_{113}	—	November 25, 2011	Haleakala	Pan-STARRS 1	L4	7.7 km	MPC · JPL
650122	2011 WA_{121}	—	May 14, 2004	Kitt Peak	Spacewatch	T_{j} (2.99) · EUP	2.7 km	MPC · JPL
650123	2011 WX_{123}	—	November 18, 2011	Mount Lemmon	Mount Lemmon Survey	·	2.1 km	MPC · JPL
650124	2011 WF_{125}	—	November 18, 2011	Mount Lemmon	Mount Lemmon Survey	·	2.7 km	MPC · JPL
650125	2011 WA_{132}	—	August 29, 2005	Kitt Peak	Spacewatch	HYG	2.0 km	MPC · JPL
650126	2011 WK_{133}	—	December 27, 2006	Mount Lemmon	Mount Lemmon Survey	·	3.1 km	MPC · JPL
650127	2011 WM_{133}	—	December 21, 2006	Kitt Peak	L. H. Wasserman, M. W. Buie	·	2.5 km	MPC · JPL
650128	2011 WR_{133}	—	November 18, 2011	Siding Spring	SSS	T_{j} (2.99) · EUP	3.2 km	MPC · JPL
650129	2011 WH_{137}	—	October 26, 2011	Haleakala	Pan-STARRS 1	·	3.2 km	MPC · JPL
650130	2011 WM_{142}	—	July 30, 2005	Palomar	NEAT	·	2.3 km	MPC · JPL
650131	2011 WT_{142}	—	July 5, 2005	Mount Lemmon	Mount Lemmon Survey	·	1.8 km	MPC · JPL
650132	2011 WC_{144}	—	October 7, 2005	Catalina	CSS	·	2.4 km	MPC · JPL
650133	2011 WV_{151}	—	August 31, 2005	Palomar	NEAT	TIR	2.5 km	MPC · JPL
650134	2011 WC_{153}	—	January 10, 2007	Mount Lemmon	Mount Lemmon Survey	LIX	2.7 km	MPC · JPL
650135	2011 WS_{157}	—	January 5, 2013	Mount Lemmon	Mount Lemmon Survey	L4	6.9 km	MPC · JPL
650136	2011 WA_{158}	—	October 1, 2011	Mount Lemmon	Mount Lemmon Survey	·	2.8 km	MPC · JPL
650137	2011 WB_{158}	—	November 24, 2011	Haleakala	Pan-STARRS 1	·	1.3 km	MPC · JPL
650138	2011 WO_{158}	—	November 24, 2011	Haleakala	Pan-STARRS 1	VER	2.0 km	MPC · JPL
650139	2011 WD_{160}	—	November 21, 2011	Bergisch Gladbach	W. Bickel	·	2.5 km	MPC · JPL
650140	2011 WG_{164}	—	January 10, 2013	Haleakala	Pan-STARRS 1	VER	2.2 km	MPC · JPL
650141	2011 WC_{165}	—	November 26, 2011	Mount Lemmon	Mount Lemmon Survey	·	960 m	MPC · JPL
650142	2011 WC_{169}	—	October 28, 2011	Mount Lemmon	Mount Lemmon Survey	·	2.7 km	MPC · JPL
650143	2011 WD_{170}	—	March 5, 2008	Mount Lemmon	Mount Lemmon Survey	·	2.8 km	MPC · JPL
650144	2011 WG_{174}	—	November 23, 2011	Kitt Peak	Spacewatch	·	970 m	MPC · JPL
650145	2011 WU_{180}	—	November 28, 2011	Mount Lemmon	Mount Lemmon Survey	·	2.4 km	MPC · JPL
650146	2011 WY_{182}	—	November 24, 2011	Mount Lemmon	Mount Lemmon Survey	·	2.6 km	MPC · JPL
650147	2011 WE_{183}	—	November 17, 2011	Mount Lemmon	Mount Lemmon Survey	·	2.3 km	MPC · JPL
650148	2011 WM_{185}	—	November 30, 2011	Mount Lemmon	Mount Lemmon Survey	·	2.7 km	MPC · JPL
650149	2011 XV	—	February 16, 2007	Catalina	CSS	·	2.2 km	MPC · JPL
650150	2011 YP_{3}	—	December 20, 2011	ESA OGS	ESA OGS	·	810 m	MPC · JPL
650151	2011 YE_{5}	—	February 15, 2002	Cerro Tololo	Deep Lens Survey	·	3.8 km	MPC · JPL
650152	2011 YZ_{7}	—	February 26, 2007	Mount Lemmon	Mount Lemmon Survey	·	2.9 km	MPC · JPL
650153	2011 YV_{8}	—	March 10, 2007	Mount Lemmon	Mount Lemmon Survey	THM	1.7 km	MPC · JPL
650154	2011 YT_{15}	—	December 25, 2011	Mount Lemmon	Mount Lemmon Survey	·	630 m	MPC · JPL
650155	2011 YX_{18}	—	December 26, 2011	Mount Lemmon	Mount Lemmon Survey	VER	2.3 km	MPC · JPL
650156	2011 YW_{28}	—	December 27, 2011	Mount Lemmon	Mount Lemmon Survey	H	420 m	MPC · JPL
650157	2011 YW_{43}	—	September 22, 2009	Kitt Peak	Spacewatch	L4	6.6 km	MPC · JPL
650158	2011 YG_{44}	—	December 27, 2011	Kitt Peak	Spacewatch	L4	7.2 km	MPC · JPL
650159	2011 YY_{44}	—	December 27, 2011	Kitt Peak	Spacewatch	·	1.0 km	MPC · JPL
650160	2011 YA_{52}	—	December 31, 2011	Mount Lemmon	Mount Lemmon Survey	·	970 m	MPC · JPL
650161	2011 YO_{57}	—	December 29, 2011	Kitt Peak	Spacewatch	L4	8.0 km	MPC · JPL
650162	2011 YR_{63}	—	February 19, 2004	Socorro	LINEAR	·	980 m	MPC · JPL
650163	2011 YH_{69}	—	December 26, 2011	Mount Lemmon	Mount Lemmon Survey	H	340 m	MPC · JPL
650164	2011 YJ_{69}	—	October 22, 2003	Apache Point	SDSS	·	1.1 km	MPC · JPL
650165	2011 YH_{73}	—	December 30, 2011	Mount Lemmon	Mount Lemmon Survey	·	1.9 km	MPC · JPL
650166	2011 YV_{80}	—	December 25, 2011	Piszkés-tető	K. Sárneczky, S. Kürti	·	2.2 km	MPC · JPL
650167	2011 YS_{81}	—	December 27, 2011	Kitt Peak	Spacewatch	·	2.4 km	MPC · JPL
650168	2011 YK_{87}	—	March 2, 2017	Mount Lemmon	Mount Lemmon Survey	MAR	1.0 km	MPC · JPL
650169	2011 YA_{91}	—	December 29, 2011	Mount Lemmon	Mount Lemmon Survey	·	1.3 km	MPC · JPL
650170	2011 YB_{92}	—	December 28, 2011	Kitt Peak	Spacewatch	·	2.6 km	MPC · JPL
650171	2012 AC_{5}	—	December 18, 2011	ESA OGS	ESA OGS	EOS	2.8 km	MPC · JPL
650172	2012 AK_{6}	—	January 15, 2008	Mount Lemmon	Mount Lemmon Survey	·	1.0 km	MPC · JPL
650173	2012 AR_{6}	—	October 13, 2010	Kitt Peak	Spacewatch	·	1.1 km	MPC · JPL
650174	2012 AA_{10}	—	January 4, 2012	Mount Lemmon	Mount Lemmon Survey	MAR	900 m	MPC · JPL
650175	2012 AV_{14}	—	December 26, 2011	Piszkéstető	K. Sárneczky	·	1.1 km	MPC · JPL
650176	2012 AS_{15}	—	January 14, 2012	Mount Lemmon	Mount Lemmon Survey	·	1.4 km	MPC · JPL
650177	2012 AT_{21}	—	January 1, 2012	Mount Lemmon	Mount Lemmon Survey	L4	6.8 km	MPC · JPL
650178	2012 AP_{26}	—	January 2, 2012	Kitt Peak	Spacewatch	·	480 m	MPC · JPL
650179	2012 AJ_{31}	—	January 2, 2012	Mount Lemmon	Mount Lemmon Survey	L4	6.5 km	MPC · JPL
650180	2012 AD_{33}	—	January 2, 2012	Kitt Peak	Spacewatch	L4	7.3 km	MPC · JPL
650181	2012 AD_{34}	—	January 1, 2012	Mount Lemmon	Mount Lemmon Survey	·	1.1 km	MPC · JPL
650182	2012 AH_{34}	—	January 4, 2012	Mount Lemmon	Mount Lemmon Survey	·	3.2 km	MPC · JPL
650183	2012 AR_{34}	—	October 28, 2005	Catalina	CSS	·	1.9 km	MPC · JPL
650184	2012 AB_{36}	—	January 2, 2012	Mount Lemmon	Mount Lemmon Survey	L4	5.9 km	MPC · JPL
650185	2012 BR_{2}	—	January 7, 2006	Kitt Peak	Spacewatch	·	4.2 km	MPC · JPL
650186	2012 BK_{5}	—	January 18, 2012	Mount Lemmon	Mount Lemmon Survey	·	720 m	MPC · JPL
650187	2012 BW_{5}	—	January 2, 2012	Kitt Peak	Spacewatch	·	990 m	MPC · JPL
650188	2012 BL_{7}	—	September 6, 2008	Kitt Peak	Spacewatch	L4	6.7 km	MPC · JPL
650189	2012 BK_{19}	—	December 29, 2011	Mount Lemmon	Mount Lemmon Survey	·	1.1 km	MPC · JPL
650190	2012 BF_{36}	—	January 19, 2012	Mount Lemmon	Mount Lemmon Survey	L4	6.8 km	MPC · JPL
650191	2012 BH_{37}	—	December 4, 2007	Kitt Peak	Spacewatch	·	1.2 km	MPC · JPL
650192	2012 BZ_{45}	—	August 22, 2003	Palomar	NEAT	·	3.3 km	MPC · JPL
650193	2012 BH_{60}	—	November 11, 2009	Kitt Peak	Spacewatch	L4	7.2 km	MPC · JPL
650194	2012 BM_{60}	—	October 1, 2008	Mount Lemmon	Mount Lemmon Survey	L4	6.6 km	MPC · JPL
650195	2012 BP_{60}	—	January 24, 2012	Haleakala	Pan-STARRS 1	L4	8.4 km	MPC · JPL
650196	2012 BG_{62}	—	August 26, 2005	Palomar	NEAT	·	2.7 km	MPC · JPL
650197	2012 BS_{65}	—	January 2, 2012	Mount Lemmon	Mount Lemmon Survey	·	3.2 km	MPC · JPL
650198	2012 BS_{71}	—	January 21, 2012	Catalina	CSS	·	1.6 km	MPC · JPL
650199	2012 BA_{72}	—	January 21, 2012	Kitt Peak	Spacewatch	BRG	1.0 km	MPC · JPL
650200	2012 BA_{76}	—	January 18, 2012	Mount Lemmon	Mount Lemmon Survey	EOS	2.0 km	MPC · JPL

== 650201–650300 ==
back to top

Designation			Discovery			Properties		Ref
Permanent	Provisional	Named after	Date	Site	Discoverer(s)	Category	Diam.	Ref
650201	2012 BF_{76}	—	February 1, 2008	Kitt Peak	Spacewatch	·	890 m	MPC · JPL
650202	2012 BW_{78}	—	January 1, 2012	Mount Lemmon	Mount Lemmon Survey	·	1.4 km	MPC · JPL
650203	2012 BG_{79}	—	January 27, 2012	Mount Lemmon	Mount Lemmon Survey	·	2.2 km	MPC · JPL
650204	2012 BK_{80}	—	January 27, 2012	Mount Lemmon	Mount Lemmon Survey	·	700 m	MPC · JPL
650205	2012 BL_{80}	—	February 2, 2008	Mount Lemmon	Mount Lemmon Survey	·	790 m	MPC · JPL
650206	2012 BR_{81}	—	January 27, 2012	Mount Lemmon	Mount Lemmon Survey	·	1.3 km	MPC · JPL
650207	2012 BF_{83}	—	January 27, 2012	Mount Lemmon	Mount Lemmon Survey	TIR	2.9 km	MPC · JPL
650208	2012 BR_{86}	—	December 31, 2011	Piszkés-tető	K. Sárneczky, A. Szing	THB	3.6 km	MPC · JPL
650209	2012 BW_{91}	—	January 19, 2012	Kitt Peak	Spacewatch	·	1.2 km	MPC · JPL
650210	2012 BO_{95}	—	May 1, 2005	Kitt Peak	D. E. Trilling, A. S. Rivkin	H	490 m	MPC · JPL
650211	2012 BT_{95}	—	October 19, 2010	Mount Lemmon	Mount Lemmon Survey	·	2.9 km	MPC · JPL
650212	2012 BP_{97}	—	October 27, 2009	Mount Lemmon	Mount Lemmon Survey	L4	7.1 km	MPC · JPL
650213	2012 BG_{98}	—	January 31, 2008	Catalina	CSS	·	810 m	MPC · JPL
650214	2012 BS_{105}	—	January 24, 2012	Haleakala	Pan-STARRS 1	·	1.0 km	MPC · JPL
650215	2012 BN_{108}	—	January 26, 2012	Haleakala	Pan-STARRS 1	·	540 m	MPC · JPL
650216	2012 BV_{115}	—	April 30, 2008	Mount Lemmon	Mount Lemmon Survey	·	2.9 km	MPC · JPL
650217	2012 BR_{123}	—	October 2, 2008	Mount Lemmon	Mount Lemmon Survey	L4	9.5 km	MPC · JPL
650218	2012 BU_{124}	—	March 12, 2008	Mount Lemmon	Mount Lemmon Survey	·	790 m	MPC · JPL
650219	2012 BW_{133}	—	April 3, 2008	Mount Lemmon	Mount Lemmon Survey	L4	10 km	MPC · JPL
650220	2012 BA_{137}	—	July 7, 2005	Mauna Kea	Veillet, C.	(5)	1.0 km	MPC · JPL
650221	2012 BT_{137}	—	September 16, 2004	Kitt Peak	Spacewatch	·	2.2 km	MPC · JPL
650222	2012 BM_{140}	—	January 18, 2012	Mount Lemmon	Mount Lemmon Survey	·	2.6 km	MPC · JPL
650223	2012 BQ_{140}	—	January 18, 2012	Mount Lemmon	Mount Lemmon Survey	·	1.2 km	MPC · JPL
650224	2012 BX_{142}	—	January 13, 2008	Mount Lemmon	Mount Lemmon Survey	·	930 m	MPC · JPL
650225	2012 BZ_{144}	—	January 26, 2012	Mount Lemmon	Mount Lemmon Survey	·	500 m	MPC · JPL
650226	2012 BZ_{153}	—	June 29, 2014	Haleakala	Pan-STARRS 1	·	1.1 km	MPC · JPL
650227	2012 BC_{155}	—	December 4, 2010	Mount Lemmon	Mount Lemmon Survey	L4	6.3 km	MPC · JPL
650228	2012 BG_{155}	—	January 19, 2012	Mount Lemmon	Mount Lemmon Survey	L4	6.3 km	MPC · JPL
650229	2012 BB_{184}	—	January 25, 2012	Haleakala	Pan-STARRS 1	·	2.9 km	MPC · JPL
650230	2012 BF_{186}	—	January 26, 2012	Mount Lemmon	Mount Lemmon Survey	L4	5.9 km	MPC · JPL
650231	2012 BX_{186}	—	January 29, 2012	Kitt Peak	Spacewatch	·	1.6 km	MPC · JPL
650232	2012 BP_{187}	—	January 29, 2012	Mount Lemmon	Mount Lemmon Survey	·	2.6 km	MPC · JPL
650233	2012 BH_{188}	—	January 26, 2012	Mount Lemmon	Mount Lemmon Survey	L4	6.1 km	MPC · JPL
650234	2012 CC_{6}	—	October 21, 2006	Mount Lemmon	Mount Lemmon Survey	·	1.0 km	MPC · JPL
650235	2012 CN_{11}	—	February 12, 2004	Kitt Peak	Spacewatch	·	760 m	MPC · JPL
650236	2012 CV_{11}	—	May 9, 2002	Palomar	NEAT	·	690 m	MPC · JPL
650237	2012 CG_{17}	—	February 3, 2012	Haleakala	Pan-STARRS 1	L4	6.0 km	MPC · JPL
650238	2012 CB_{22}	—	February 13, 2012	Haleakala	Pan-STARRS 1	·	960 m	MPC · JPL
650239	2012 CP_{26}	—	March 11, 2008	Mount Lemmon	Mount Lemmon Survey	EUN	910 m	MPC · JPL
650240	2012 CX_{26}	—	January 18, 2012	Kitt Peak	Spacewatch	EUN	1.2 km	MPC · JPL
650241	2012 CG_{28}	—	February 13, 2012	Haleakala	Pan-STARRS 1	·	840 m	MPC · JPL
650242	2012 CZ_{28}	—	March 26, 2008	Mount Lemmon	Mount Lemmon Survey	·	1.0 km	MPC · JPL
650243	2012 CT_{34}	—	February 9, 1999	Kitt Peak	Spacewatch	HNS	1.1 km	MPC · JPL
650244	2012 CY_{36}	—	February 1, 2012	Mount Lemmon	Mount Lemmon Survey	·	2.8 km	MPC · JPL
650245	2012 CK_{38}	—	March 26, 2007	Mount Lemmon	Mount Lemmon Survey	·	2.2 km	MPC · JPL
650246	2012 CV_{42}	—	January 21, 2012	Kitt Peak	Spacewatch	·	1.3 km	MPC · JPL
650247	2012 CM_{43}	—	January 18, 2012	Kitt Peak	Spacewatch	EUN	950 m	MPC · JPL
650248	2012 CY_{43}	—	January 29, 2012	Kitt Peak	Spacewatch	·	880 m	MPC · JPL
650249	2012 CK_{46}	—	February 15, 2012	Haleakala	Pan-STARRS 1	·	980 m	MPC · JPL
650250	2012 CG_{49}	—	February 13, 2012	Haleakala	Pan-STARRS 1	V	700 m	MPC · JPL
650251	2012 CK_{55}	—	January 29, 2012	Catalina	CSS	TIR	3.1 km	MPC · JPL
650252	2012 CL_{57}	—	January 19, 2012	Haleakala	Pan-STARRS 1	·	1.7 km	MPC · JPL
650253	2012 CO_{57}	—	February 9, 2008	Kitt Peak	Spacewatch	·	980 m	MPC · JPL
650254	2012 CU_{57}	—	October 7, 2008	Mount Lemmon	Mount Lemmon Survey	L4	7.4 km	MPC · JPL
650255	2012 CM_{58}	—	March 8, 2008	Kitt Peak	Spacewatch	·	1.0 km	MPC · JPL
650256	2012 CK_{66}	—	October 17, 2010	Mount Lemmon	Mount Lemmon Survey	·	1.0 km	MPC · JPL
650257	2012 CS_{66}	—	February 13, 2012	Haleakala	Pan-STARRS 1	·	920 m	MPC · JPL
650258	2012 CL_{69}	—	February 1, 2012	Mount Lemmon	Mount Lemmon Survey	·	2.5 km	MPC · JPL
650259	2012 DR_{1}	—	February 1, 2012	Kitt Peak	Spacewatch	·	750 m	MPC · JPL
650260	2012 DL_{3}	—	October 4, 2004	Apache Point	SDSS Collaboration	·	2.7 km	MPC · JPL
650261	2012 DG_{10}	—	April 13, 2004	Kitt Peak	Spacewatch	·	1.1 km	MPC · JPL
650262	2012 DB_{12}	—	February 19, 2012	Kitt Peak	Spacewatch	·	3.1 km	MPC · JPL
650263	2012 DK_{13}	—	September 16, 2006	Kitt Peak	Spacewatch	·	900 m	MPC · JPL
650264	2012 DS_{18}	—	July 12, 2005	Mount Lemmon	Mount Lemmon Survey	·	1.0 km	MPC · JPL
650265	2012 DA_{21}	—	September 20, 2009	Calvin-Rehoboth	L. A. Molnar	TEL	1.6 km	MPC · JPL
650266	2012 DS_{23}	—	May 4, 2005	Palomar	NEAT	·	970 m	MPC · JPL
650267	2012 DL_{26}	—	July 9, 2004	Palomar	NEAT	(1547)	1.6 km	MPC · JPL
650268	2012 DS_{28}	—	February 28, 2008	Kitt Peak	Spacewatch	·	1.1 km	MPC · JPL
650269	2012 DL_{32}	—	February 9, 2008	Mount Lemmon	Mount Lemmon Survey	·	1.6 km	MPC · JPL
650270	2012 DS_{35}	—	March 1, 2008	Kitt Peak	Spacewatch	·	1.1 km	MPC · JPL
650271	2012 DZ_{35}	—	October 17, 2010	Mount Lemmon	Mount Lemmon Survey	EUN	1.1 km	MPC · JPL
650272	2012 DK_{40}	—	September 18, 2009	Kitt Peak	Spacewatch	·	1.7 km	MPC · JPL
650273	2012 DQ_{40}	—	March 15, 2008	Kitt Peak	Spacewatch	EUN	720 m	MPC · JPL
650274	2012 DP_{50}	—	October 23, 2006	Kitt Peak	Spacewatch	·	880 m	MPC · JPL
650275	2012 DK_{51}	—	February 26, 2012	Kitt Peak	Spacewatch	EUN	770 m	MPC · JPL
650276	2012 DK_{52}	—	February 12, 2008	Kitt Peak	Spacewatch	·	810 m	MPC · JPL
650277	2012 DB_{53}	—	February 27, 2012	Kitt Peak	Spacewatch	·	1.6 km	MPC · JPL
650278	2012 DD_{53}	—	November 18, 2004	Campo Imperatore	CINEOS	·	3.6 km	MPC · JPL
650279	2012 DT_{55}	—	February 24, 2012	Haleakala	Pan-STARRS 1	EUN	1.1 km	MPC · JPL
650280	2012 DZ_{55}	—	September 28, 2003	Apache Point	SDSS Collaboration	·	3.4 km	MPC · JPL
650281	2012 DO_{56}	—	February 25, 2012	Mount Lemmon	Mount Lemmon Survey	·	1.2 km	MPC · JPL
650282	2012 DC_{57}	—	February 25, 2012	Mount Lemmon	Mount Lemmon Survey	(5)	770 m	MPC · JPL
650283	2012 DO_{60}	—	March 7, 2008	Mount Lemmon	Mount Lemmon Survey	·	720 m	MPC · JPL
650284	2012 DS_{61}	—	October 27, 2006	Kitt Peak	Spacewatch	·	1.3 km	MPC · JPL
650285	2012 DZ_{66}	—	July 30, 2005	Palomar	NEAT	·	1.3 km	MPC · JPL
650286	2012 DZ_{68}	—	February 3, 2012	Haleakala	Pan-STARRS 1	·	830 m	MPC · JPL
650287	2012 DB_{74}	—	February 27, 2012	Kitt Peak	Spacewatch	H	390 m	MPC · JPL
650288	2012 DV_{78}	—	June 20, 2006	Catalina	CSS	·	1.1 km	MPC · JPL
650289	2012 DW_{78}	—	August 31, 2000	Kitt Peak	Spacewatch	·	2.6 km	MPC · JPL
650290	2012 DS_{83}	—	February 25, 2012	Kitt Peak	Spacewatch	·	1.2 km	MPC · JPL
650291	2012 DX_{89}	—	January 20, 2012	Haleakala	Pan-STARRS 1	·	2.0 km	MPC · JPL
650292	2012 DG_{95}	—	April 8, 2008	Kitt Peak	Spacewatch	LEO	1.4 km	MPC · JPL
650293	2012 DT_{95}	—	September 2, 2010	Mount Lemmon	Mount Lemmon Survey	·	960 m	MPC · JPL
650294	2012 DC_{100}	—	February 28, 2012	Haleakala	Pan-STARRS 1	HNS	880 m	MPC · JPL
650295	2012 DG_{100}	—	February 27, 2012	Haleakala	Pan-STARRS 1	·	1.3 km	MPC · JPL
650296	2012 DZ_{101}	—	February 16, 2012	Haleakala	Pan-STARRS 1	·	900 m	MPC · JPL
650297	2012 DE_{103}	—	March 31, 2008	Kitt Peak	Spacewatch	·	1.2 km	MPC · JPL
650298	2012 DF_{104}	—	February 27, 2012	Haleakala	Pan-STARRS 1	·	1.4 km	MPC · JPL
650299	2012 DM_{106}	—	February 3, 2000	Kitt Peak	Spacewatch	·	3.1 km	MPC · JPL
650300	2012 DA_{110}	—	February 25, 2012	Mount Lemmon	Mount Lemmon Survey	(5)	860 m	MPC · JPL

== 650301–650400 ==
back to top

Designation			Discovery			Properties		Ref
Permanent	Provisional	Named after	Date	Site	Discoverer(s)	Category	Diam.	Ref
650301	2012 DN_{111}	—	March 10, 2007	Kitt Peak	Spacewatch	·	1.5 km	MPC · JPL
650302	2012 DR_{122}	—	February 20, 2012	Haleakala	Pan-STARRS 1	·	1.7 km	MPC · JPL
650303	2012 DE_{127}	—	February 28, 2012	Haleakala	Pan-STARRS 1	·	1.3 km	MPC · JPL
650304	2012 EA_{6}	—	September 30, 2003	Kitt Peak	Spacewatch	NYS	890 m	MPC · JPL
650305	2012 ET_{7}	—	January 19, 2012	Haleakala	Pan-STARRS 1	EUN	910 m	MPC · JPL
650306	2012 ET_{9}	—	March 15, 2012	Kitt Peak	Spacewatch	·	350 m	MPC · JPL
650307	2012 ES_{20}	—	July 8, 2004	Reedy Creek	J. Broughton	·	1.5 km	MPC · JPL
650308	2012 FF_{1}	—	March 16, 2012	Bergisch Gladbach	W. Bickel	·	1.6 km	MPC · JPL
650309	2012 FM_{3}	—	March 15, 2012	Mount Lemmon	Mount Lemmon Survey	TIR	2.5 km	MPC · JPL
650310	2012 FH_{12}	—	March 17, 2012	Mount Lemmon	Mount Lemmon Survey	·	1.2 km	MPC · JPL
650311	2012 FV_{13}	—	February 28, 2012	Haleakala	Pan-STARRS 1	H	370 m	MPC · JPL
650312	2012 FW_{13}	—	February 24, 2012	Haleakala	Pan-STARRS 1	H	410 m	MPC · JPL
650313	2012 FN_{20}	—	December 31, 2007	Kitt Peak	Spacewatch	·	850 m	MPC · JPL
650314	2012 FG_{23}	—	May 13, 2007	Kitt Peak	Spacewatch	H	470 m	MPC · JPL
650315	2012 FC_{25}	—	March 2, 2001	Anderson Mesa	LONEOS	·	3.2 km	MPC · JPL
650316	2012 FL_{39}	—	February 21, 2007	Mount Lemmon	Mount Lemmon Survey	·	1.9 km	MPC · JPL
650317	2012 FO_{40}	—	February 27, 2012	Haleakala	Pan-STARRS 1	·	630 m	MPC · JPL
650318	2012 FN_{64}	—	March 23, 2012	Mount Lemmon	Mount Lemmon Survey	KOR	1.1 km	MPC · JPL
650319	2012 FH_{72}	—	April 4, 2008	Kitt Peak	Spacewatch	·	1.6 km	MPC · JPL
650320	2012 FY_{74}	—	January 27, 2003	Palomar	NEAT	·	1.6 km	MPC · JPL
650321	2012 FJ_{75}	—	March 16, 2012	Haleakala	Pan-STARRS 1	JUN	1.0 km	MPC · JPL
650322	2012 FH_{77}	—	February 3, 2012	Mount Lemmon	Mount Lemmon Survey	·	1.3 km	MPC · JPL
650323	2012 FL_{79}	—	September 30, 2010	Mount Lemmon	Mount Lemmon Survey	EUN	790 m	MPC · JPL
650324	2012 FU_{87}	—	March 16, 2012	Mount Lemmon	Mount Lemmon Survey	TIN	820 m	MPC · JPL
650325	2012 FX_{103}	—	August 8, 2016	Haleakala	Pan-STARRS 1	·	600 m	MPC · JPL
650326	2012 FF_{104}	—	March 29, 2012	Mount Lemmon	Mount Lemmon Survey	·	550 m	MPC · JPL
650327	2012 FH_{106}	—	March 23, 2012	Kitt Peak	Spacewatch	·	1.9 km	MPC · JPL
650328	2012 FN_{106}	—	March 27, 2012	Kitt Peak	Spacewatch	·	1.3 km	MPC · JPL
650329	2012 FJ_{110}	—	March 24, 2012	Mount Lemmon	Mount Lemmon Survey	·	2.9 km	MPC · JPL
650330	2012 FN_{110}	—	March 24, 2012	Mount Lemmon	Mount Lemmon Survey	·	1.5 km	MPC · JPL
650331	2012 GQ_{3}	—	October 23, 2003	Apache Point	SDSS Collaboration	·	2.6 km	MPC · JPL
650332	2012 GM_{9}	—	November 16, 2003	Apache Point	SDSS Collaboration	·	2.8 km	MPC · JPL
650333	2012 GN_{11}	—	April 13, 2012	Haleakala	Pan-STARRS 1	BAR	1.2 km	MPC · JPL
650334	2012 GS_{11}	—	October 24, 2005	Anderson Mesa	LONEOS	H	380 m	MPC · JPL
650335	2012 GL_{17}	—	April 15, 2012	Haleakala	Pan-STARRS 1	PHO	650 m	MPC · JPL
650336	2012 GS_{17}	—	March 20, 1999	Apache Point	SDSS Collaboration	·	1.8 km	MPC · JPL
650337	2012 GU_{18}	—	January 29, 2003	Kitt Peak	Spacewatch	·	1.3 km	MPC · JPL
650338	2012 GL_{20}	—	March 29, 2012	Haleakala	Pan-STARRS 1	RAF	860 m	MPC · JPL
650339	2012 GT_{21}	—	April 5, 2008	Kitt Peak	Spacewatch	·	1.4 km	MPC · JPL
650340	2012 GH_{25}	—	October 18, 2003	Kitt Peak	Spacewatch	EOS	2.0 km	MPC · JPL
650341	2012 GD_{26}	—	April 14, 2012	Haleakala	Pan-STARRS 1	H	360 m	MPC · JPL
650342	2012 GF_{26}	—	March 29, 2012	Haleakala	Pan-STARRS 1	H	390 m	MPC · JPL
650343	2012 GN_{33}	—	April 1, 2012	Mount Lemmon	Mount Lemmon Survey	MAR	850 m	MPC · JPL
650344	2012 GQ_{33}	—	July 21, 2002	Palomar	NEAT	·	3.6 km	MPC · JPL
650345	2012 GE_{38}	—	February 7, 2011	Mount Lemmon	Mount Lemmon Survey	·	2.9 km	MPC · JPL
650346	2012 GQ_{38}	—	April 15, 2012	Haleakala	Pan-STARRS 1	·	630 m	MPC · JPL
650347	2012 GV_{39}	—	November 21, 2009	Mount Lemmon	Mount Lemmon Survey	·	1.8 km	MPC · JPL
650348	2012 GW_{41}	—	April 1, 2012	Haleakala	Pan-STARRS 1	·	1.3 km	MPC · JPL
650349	2012 GH_{43}	—	April 13, 2012	Haleakala	Pan-STARRS 1	·	1.9 km	MPC · JPL
650350	2012 GZ_{50}	—	April 15, 2012	Haleakala	Pan-STARRS 1	·	1.4 km	MPC · JPL
650351	2012 HA_{7}	—	September 26, 2009	Kitt Peak	Spacewatch	·	2.1 km	MPC · JPL
650352	2012 HC_{9}	—	June 1, 2003	Kitt Peak	Spacewatch	·	1.8 km	MPC · JPL
650353	2012 HX_{9}	—	April 18, 2012	Mount Lemmon	Mount Lemmon Survey	·	3.6 km	MPC · JPL
650354	2012 HV_{10}	—	April 20, 2012	Mount Lemmon	Mount Lemmon Survey	·	1.5 km	MPC · JPL
650355	2012 HK_{12}	—	January 23, 2011	Mount Lemmon	Mount Lemmon Survey	MAR	1.4 km	MPC · JPL
650356	2012 HX_{13}	—	April 15, 2012	Haleakala	Pan-STARRS 1	H	520 m	MPC · JPL
650357	2012 HG_{14}	—	February 6, 2007	Lulin	LUSS	·	1.7 km	MPC · JPL
650358	2012 HR_{16}	—	April 21, 2012	Kitt Peak	Spacewatch	·	620 m	MPC · JPL
650359	2012 HU_{17}	—	April 12, 2002	Palomar	NEAT	·	860 m	MPC · JPL
650360	2012 HO_{18}	—	December 20, 2004	Mount Lemmon	Mount Lemmon Survey	VER	2.8 km	MPC · JPL
650361	2012 HZ_{24}	—	October 27, 2005	Mount Lemmon	Mount Lemmon Survey	H	380 m	MPC · JPL
650362	2012 HM_{31}	—	April 15, 2012	Haleakala	Pan-STARRS 1	·	1.6 km	MPC · JPL
650363	2012 HT_{34}	—	February 1, 2003	Palomar	NEAT	MAR	1.4 km	MPC · JPL
650364	2012 HO_{41}	—	October 27, 2009	Mount Lemmon	Mount Lemmon Survey	·	2.5 km	MPC · JPL
650365	2012 HZ_{43}	—	September 17, 2006	Kitt Peak	Spacewatch	·	560 m	MPC · JPL
650366	2012 HG_{44}	—	March 23, 2003	Socorro	LINEAR	·	2.0 km	MPC · JPL
650367	2012 HN_{45}	—	November 19, 2003	Kitt Peak	Spacewatch	·	3.7 km	MPC · JPL
650368	2012 HW_{48}	—	August 13, 2002	Socorro	LINEAR	EOS	2.5 km	MPC · JPL
650369	2012 HW_{50}	—	April 22, 2012	Kitt Peak	Spacewatch	GEF	1.2 km	MPC · JPL
650370	2012 HJ_{52}	—	April 27, 2012	Haleakala	Pan-STARRS 1	·	560 m	MPC · JPL
650371	2012 HZ_{52}	—	March 8, 2005	Mount Graham	Ryan, W. H., Martinez, C. T.	·	630 m	MPC · JPL
650372	2012 HS_{53}	—	April 13, 2012	Catalina	CSS	·	1.3 km	MPC · JPL
650373	2012 HY_{57}	—	April 9, 2003	Palomar	NEAT	·	1.4 km	MPC · JPL
650374	2012 HE_{60}	—	March 15, 2012	Kitt Peak	Spacewatch	·	860 m	MPC · JPL
650375	2012 HE_{63}	—	September 22, 2003	Kitt Peak	Spacewatch	·	2.1 km	MPC · JPL
650376	2012 HQ_{67}	—	January 30, 2011	Mount Lemmon	Mount Lemmon Survey	EOS	2.3 km	MPC · JPL
650377	2012 HL_{69}	—	April 15, 2012	Haleakala	Pan-STARRS 1	·	1.4 km	MPC · JPL
650378	2012 HH_{71}	—	November 30, 2010	Mount Lemmon	Mount Lemmon Survey	·	1.3 km	MPC · JPL
650379	2012 HY_{73}	—	October 13, 2004	Kitt Peak	Spacewatch	T_{j} (2.99) · EUP	2.9 km	MPC · JPL
650380	2012 HL_{78}	—	October 15, 2004	Needville	Wells, D.	·	1.8 km	MPC · JPL
650381	2012 HA_{79}	—	October 24, 2005	Kitt Peak	Spacewatch	·	2.0 km	MPC · JPL
650382	2012 HH_{79}	—	November 10, 2004	Kitt Peak	Spacewatch	·	3.8 km	MPC · JPL
650383	2012 HX_{79}	—	April 29, 2012	Kitt Peak	Spacewatch	·	1.7 km	MPC · JPL
650384	2012 HW_{80}	—	October 15, 2001	Apache Point	SDSS Collaboration	·	1.4 km	MPC · JPL
650385	2012 HW_{81}	—	November 9, 2007	Kitt Peak	Spacewatch	·	850 m	MPC · JPL
650386	2012 HK_{87}	—	April 20, 2012	Mount Lemmon	Mount Lemmon Survey	·	750 m	MPC · JPL
650387	2012 HL_{87}	—	April 21, 2012	Mount Lemmon	Mount Lemmon Survey	·	560 m	MPC · JPL
650388	2012 HQ_{87}	—	April 21, 2012	Mount Lemmon	Mount Lemmon Survey	·	580 m	MPC · JPL
650389	2012 HV_{87}	—	April 27, 2012	Haleakala	Pan-STARRS 1	·	580 m	MPC · JPL
650390	2012 HZ_{87}	—	April 15, 2012	Haleakala	Pan-STARRS 1	AGN	810 m	MPC · JPL
650391	2012 HA_{89}	—	April 30, 2012	Mount Lemmon	Mount Lemmon Survey	·	740 m	MPC · JPL
650392	2012 HG_{94}	—	July 7, 2016	Haleakala	Pan-STARRS 1	·	610 m	MPC · JPL
650393	2012 HW_{101}	—	April 28, 2012	Mount Lemmon	Mount Lemmon Survey	·	1.5 km	MPC · JPL
650394	2012 HR_{106}	—	January 8, 2011	Mount Lemmon	Mount Lemmon Survey	·	1.4 km	MPC · JPL
650395	2012 HC_{110}	—	April 27, 2012	Haleakala	Pan-STARRS 1	·	940 m	MPC · JPL
650396	2012 HO_{112}	—	April 27, 2012	Haleakala	Pan-STARRS 1	·	530 m	MPC · JPL
650397	2012 JG_{1}	—	April 15, 2012	Haleakala	Pan-STARRS 1	·	1 km	MPC · JPL
650398	2012 JT_{2}	—	January 16, 2005	Mauna Kea	Veillet, C.	·	2.7 km	MPC · JPL
650399	2012 JA_{9}	—	February 25, 2011	Mount Lemmon	Mount Lemmon Survey	·	2.4 km	MPC · JPL
650400	2012 JJ_{13}	—	March 31, 2012	Mount Lemmon	Mount Lemmon Survey	MAR	980 m	MPC · JPL

== 650401–650500 ==
back to top

Designation			Discovery			Properties		Ref
Permanent	Provisional	Named after	Date	Site	Discoverer(s)	Category	Diam.	Ref
650401	2012 JN_{13}	—	July 30, 2008	Siding Spring	SSS	·	1.8 km	MPC · JPL
650402	2012 JU_{18}	—	April 15, 2012	Haleakala	Pan-STARRS 1	·	2.2 km	MPC · JPL
650403	2012 JE_{20}	—	September 29, 2005	Mount Lemmon	Mount Lemmon Survey	EUN	1.3 km	MPC · JPL
650404	2012 JP_{20}	—	May 1, 2012	Mount Lemmon	Mount Lemmon Survey	·	2.4 km	MPC · JPL
650405	2012 JF_{22}	—	February 25, 2012	Mount Lemmon	Mount Lemmon Survey	·	1.0 km	MPC · JPL
650406	2012 JD_{23}	—	March 7, 2008	Kitt Peak	Spacewatch	·	1.1 km	MPC · JPL
650407	2012 JD_{28}	—	October 17, 2006	Mount Lemmon	Mount Lemmon Survey	·	680 m	MPC · JPL
650408	2012 JW_{29}	—	January 4, 2011	Mount Lemmon	Mount Lemmon Survey	AEO	860 m	MPC · JPL
650409	2012 JD_{35}	—	December 15, 2006	Kitt Peak	Spacewatch	·	1.3 km	MPC · JPL
650410	2012 JD_{38}	—	March 2, 2008	Kitt Peak	Spacewatch	MAS	580 m	MPC · JPL
650411	2012 JE_{38}	—	January 27, 2003	Haleakala	NEAT	·	1.4 km	MPC · JPL
650412	2012 JC_{46}	—	September 28, 2009	Kitt Peak	Spacewatch	·	770 m	MPC · JPL
650413	2012 JJ_{46}	—	May 15, 2012	Mount Lemmon	Mount Lemmon Survey	·	510 m	MPC · JPL
650414	2012 JK_{46}	—	October 31, 2006	Mount Lemmon	Mount Lemmon Survey	·	610 m	MPC · JPL
650415	2012 JE_{51}	—	November 10, 2010	Vail-Jarnac	Glinos, T.	·	1.2 km	MPC · JPL
650416	2012 JJ_{51}	—	May 14, 2012	Kitt Peak	Spacewatch	·	1.7 km	MPC · JPL
650417	2012 JU_{53}	—	April 27, 2012	Haleakala	Pan-STARRS 1	EUN	860 m	MPC · JPL
650418	2012 JA_{56}	—	May 12, 2012	Mount Lemmon	Mount Lemmon Survey	·	460 m	MPC · JPL
650419	2012 JT_{61}	—	August 18, 2009	Kitt Peak	Spacewatch	·	560 m	MPC · JPL
650420	2012 JD_{62}	—	May 14, 2012	Haleakala	Pan-STARRS 1	·	1.2 km	MPC · JPL
650421	2012 JP_{66}	—	May 19, 2005	Mount Lemmon	Mount Lemmon Survey	·	1.1 km	MPC · JPL
650422	2012 KH	—	May 16, 2012	Haleakala	Pan-STARRS 1	H	400 m	MPC · JPL
650423	2012 KU	—	May 16, 2012	Mount Lemmon	Mount Lemmon Survey	·	1.8 km	MPC · JPL
650424	2012 KY_{1}	—	March 29, 2012	Kitt Peak	Spacewatch	·	1.5 km	MPC · JPL
650425	2012 KK_{5}	—	May 16, 2012	Mount Lemmon	Mount Lemmon Survey	WIT	810 m	MPC · JPL
650426	2012 KF_{9}	—	May 15, 2012	Haleakala	Pan-STARRS 1	H	450 m	MPC · JPL
650427	2012 KP_{9}	—	October 24, 2003	Apache Point	SDSS Collaboration	EOS	1.9 km	MPC · JPL
650428	2012 KG_{10}	—	May 16, 2012	Mount Lemmon	Mount Lemmon Survey	AGN	1.1 km	MPC · JPL
650429	2012 KM_{10}	—	December 21, 2006	Kitt Peak	L. H. Wasserman, M. W. Buie	·	1.3 km	MPC · JPL
650430	2012 KS_{15}	—	May 15, 2012	Mount Lemmon	Mount Lemmon Survey	·	1.7 km	MPC · JPL
650431	2012 KW_{16}	—	May 20, 2012	Mount Lemmon	Mount Lemmon Survey	·	1.4 km	MPC · JPL
650432	2012 KE_{20}	—	August 21, 2003	Mauna Kea	D. D. Balam, K. M. Perrett	·	510 m	MPC · JPL
650433	2012 KU_{20}	—	January 16, 2005	Mauna Kea	Veillet, C.	·	580 m	MPC · JPL
650434	2012 KW_{21}	—	May 17, 2012	Mount Lemmon	Mount Lemmon Survey	·	1.4 km	MPC · JPL
650435	2012 KS_{23}	—	September 18, 2009	Kitt Peak	Spacewatch	·	710 m	MPC · JPL
650436	2012 KM_{24}	—	May 21, 2012	Haleakala	Pan-STARRS 1	·	720 m	MPC · JPL
650437	2012 KO_{25}	—	July 31, 2009	Kitt Peak	Spacewatch	·	1.0 km	MPC · JPL
650438	2012 KW_{29}	—	April 19, 2012	Kitt Peak	Spacewatch	DOR	2.2 km	MPC · JPL
650439	2012 KZ_{29}	—	April 27, 2012	Haleakala	Pan-STARRS 1	·	700 m	MPC · JPL
650440	2012 KZ_{30}	—	March 27, 2012	Kitt Peak	Spacewatch	·	2.8 km	MPC · JPL
650441	2012 KF_{31}	—	September 20, 2006	Palomar	NEAT	·	630 m	MPC · JPL
650442	2012 KY_{31}	—	May 16, 2012	Mount Lemmon	Mount Lemmon Survey	·	1.4 km	MPC · JPL
650443	2012 KT_{32}	—	September 30, 2003	Kitt Peak	Spacewatch	·	1.5 km	MPC · JPL
650444	2012 KE_{34}	—	March 13, 2005	Catalina	CSS	·	670 m	MPC · JPL
650445	2012 KJ_{36}	—	October 20, 2003	Kitt Peak	Spacewatch	·	3.1 km	MPC · JPL
650446	2012 KY_{36}	—	May 17, 2012	Mount Lemmon	Mount Lemmon Survey	·	1.3 km	MPC · JPL
650447	2012 KB_{37}	—	February 9, 2006	Palomar	NEAT	·	3.1 km	MPC · JPL
650448	2012 KM_{38}	—	January 25, 2007	Kitt Peak	Spacewatch	·	1.4 km	MPC · JPL
650449	2012 KM_{39}	—	April 19, 2012	Kitt Peak	Spacewatch	·	1.4 km	MPC · JPL
650450	2012 KK_{41}	—	May 20, 2012	Mount Lemmon	Mount Lemmon Survey	·	1.9 km	MPC · JPL
650451	2012 KY_{42}	—	May 23, 2003	Kitt Peak	Spacewatch	·	1.8 km	MPC · JPL
650452	2012 KH_{46}	—	April 27, 2012	Mount Lemmon	Mount Lemmon Survey	·	630 m	MPC · JPL
650453	2012 KZ_{48}	—	May 29, 2012	Mount Lemmon	Mount Lemmon Survey	·	580 m	MPC · JPL
650454	2012 KN_{51}	—	March 28, 2012	Mount Lemmon	Mount Lemmon Survey	·	1.4 km	MPC · JPL
650455	2012 KD_{54}	—	November 6, 2004	Palomar	NEAT	·	1.9 km	MPC · JPL
650456	2012 KG_{56}	—	May 16, 2012	Haleakala	Pan-STARRS 1	PHO	640 m	MPC · JPL
650457	2012 KO_{57}	—	November 26, 2014	Haleakala	Pan-STARRS 1	AGN	990 m	MPC · JPL
650458	2012 KB_{60}	—	May 19, 2012	Haleakala	Pan-STARRS 1	·	1.2 km	MPC · JPL
650459	2012 KF_{63}	—	May 29, 2012	Mount Lemmon	Mount Lemmon Survey	·	1.7 km	MPC · JPL
650460	2012 KJ_{63}	—	February 11, 2011	Mount Lemmon	Mount Lemmon Survey	·	1.2 km	MPC · JPL
650461	2012 LV	—	June 10, 2007	Kitt Peak	Spacewatch	H	390 m	MPC · JPL
650462	2012 LW	—	April 9, 2004	Apache Point	SDSS Collaboration	H	500 m	MPC · JPL
650463	2012 LS_{2}	—	April 1, 2003	Apache Point	SDSS Collaboration	EUN	960 m	MPC · JPL
650464	2012 LG_{7}	—	June 9, 2012	Mount Lemmon	Mount Lemmon Survey	HNS	960 m	MPC · JPL
650465	2012 LA_{10}	—	October 19, 2003	Apache Point	SDSS	·	600 m	MPC · JPL
650466	2012 LT_{11}	—	May 22, 2012	Kitt Peak	Spacewatch	H	510 m	MPC · JPL
650467	2012 LD_{12}	—	June 14, 2012	Mount Lemmon	Mount Lemmon Survey	·	2.2 km	MPC · JPL
650468	2012 LV_{18}	—	March 8, 2008	Mount Lemmon	Mount Lemmon Survey	·	840 m	MPC · JPL
650469	2012 LZ_{19}	—	June 9, 2012	Mount Lemmon	Mount Lemmon Survey	·	1.7 km	MPC · JPL
650470	2012 LC_{20}	—	May 27, 2012	Mount Lemmon	Mount Lemmon Survey	EUN	1.2 km	MPC · JPL
650471	2012 LK_{23}	—	May 22, 2012	ESA OGS	ESA OGS	·	730 m	MPC · JPL
650472	2012 MN_{3}	—	June 12, 2008	Kitt Peak	Spacewatch	·	1.1 km	MPC · JPL
650473	2012 MQ_{4}	—	June 21, 2012	Mount Lemmon	Mount Lemmon Survey	GAL	1.8 km	MPC · JPL
650474 Chungchaocheng	2012 MJ_{9}	Chungchaocheng	August 29, 2008	Lulin	X. Y. Hsiao, Q. Ye	·	3.9 km	MPC · JPL
650475	2012 MH_{10}	—	June 16, 2012	Haleakala	Pan-STARRS 1	·	1.9 km	MPC · JPL
650476	2012 MF_{14}	—	June 16, 2012	Haleakala	Pan-STARRS 1	·	1.7 km	MPC · JPL
650477	2012 MY_{17}	—	December 12, 2017	Polonia	Polonia	EUN	1.2 km	MPC · JPL
650478	2012 ML_{18}	—	December 9, 2010	Mount Lemmon	Mount Lemmon Survey	·	1.4 km	MPC · JPL
650479	2012 NB_{1}	—	October 22, 2008	Kitt Peak	Spacewatch	(8737)	3.0 km	MPC · JPL
650480	2012 NR_{1}	—	April 11, 2003	Palomar	NEAT	·	1.8 km	MPC · JPL
650481	2012 NY_{1}	—	July 15, 2012	Siding Spring	SSS	PHO	900 m	MPC · JPL
650482	2012 OM_{7}	—	July 18, 2012	Catalina	CSS	·	1.1 km	MPC · JPL
650483	2012 PW_{4}	—	March 12, 2008	Kitt Peak	Spacewatch	·	640 m	MPC · JPL
650484	2012 PD_{5}	—	August 6, 2012	Haleakala	Pan-STARRS 1	·	950 m	MPC · JPL
650485	2012 PW_{7}	—	August 8, 2012	Haleakala	Pan-STARRS 1	·	710 m	MPC · JPL
650486	2012 PF_{9}	—	February 27, 2008	Piszkéstető	K. Sárneczky	·	600 m	MPC · JPL
650487	2012 PF_{13}	—	August 10, 2012	Kitt Peak	Spacewatch	·	830 m	MPC · JPL
650488	2012 PW_{15}	—	August 11, 2012	Haleakala	Pan-STARRS 1	·	1.0 km	MPC · JPL
650489	2012 PR_{17}	—	August 11, 2012	Haleakala	Pan-STARRS 1	H	600 m	MPC · JPL
650490	2012 PL_{20}	—	July 20, 2012	Mayhill	L. Elenin	·	1.1 km	MPC · JPL
650491	2012 PS_{26}	—	August 30, 2005	Kitt Peak	Spacewatch	·	630 m	MPC · JPL
650492	2012 PP_{27}	—	December 3, 2005	Mauna Kea	A. Boattini	·	1.5 km	MPC · JPL
650493	2012 PL_{30}	—	August 17, 1998	Socorro	LINEAR	PHO	970 m	MPC · JPL
650494	2012 PA_{31}	—	June 9, 2005	Kitt Peak	Spacewatch	·	730 m	MPC · JPL
650495	2012 PJ_{31}	—	August 27, 2001	Anderson Mesa	LONEOS	·	2.6 km	MPC · JPL
650496	2012 PT_{31}	—	September 6, 2002	Socorro	LINEAR	·	750 m	MPC · JPL
650497	2012 PJ_{32}	—	September 30, 2005	Kitt Peak	Spacewatch	·	1.0 km	MPC · JPL
650498	2012 PK_{32}	—	August 31, 2005	Campo Imperatore	CINEOS	·	920 m	MPC · JPL
650499	2012 PM_{34}	—	July 8, 2005	Kitt Peak	Spacewatch	·	730 m	MPC · JPL
650500	2012 PW_{34}	—	October 27, 2003	Anderson Mesa	LONEOS	·	2.2 km	MPC · JPL

== 650501–650600 ==
back to top

Designation			Discovery			Properties		Ref
Permanent	Provisional	Named after	Date	Site	Discoverer(s)	Category	Diam.	Ref
650501	2012 PW_{35}	—	November 7, 2008	Mount Lemmon	Mount Lemmon Survey	·	1.9 km	MPC · JPL
650502	2012 PQ_{37}	—	October 4, 2002	Palomar	NEAT	·	760 m	MPC · JPL
650503	2012 PR_{38}	—	September 12, 2007	Mount Lemmon	Mount Lemmon Survey	·	2.8 km	MPC · JPL
650504	2012 PY_{39}	—	October 18, 2001	Palomar	NEAT	MAS	620 m	MPC · JPL
650505	2012 PR_{42}	—	September 7, 2008	Mount Lemmon	Mount Lemmon Survey	·	1.1 km	MPC · JPL
650506	2012 PV_{43}	—	July 18, 2007	Mount Lemmon	Mount Lemmon Survey	·	1.9 km	MPC · JPL
650507	2012 PO_{44}	—	August 12, 2012	Kitt Peak	Spacewatch	·	1.7 km	MPC · JPL
650508	2012 PL_{46}	—	December 10, 2013	Mount Lemmon	Mount Lemmon Survey	·	1.1 km	MPC · JPL
650509	2012 PP_{57}	—	September 28, 1998	Kitt Peak	Spacewatch	·	430 m	MPC · JPL
650510	2012 QF_{1}	—	August 6, 2005	Palomar	NEAT	·	660 m	MPC · JPL
650511	2012 QM_{3}	—	July 27, 2003	Reedy Creek	J. Broughton	EUN	1.7 km	MPC · JPL
650512	2012 QN_{3}	—	September 14, 2007	Mount Lemmon	Mount Lemmon Survey	·	1.9 km	MPC · JPL
650513	2012 QV_{4}	—	July 29, 2008	Kitt Peak	Spacewatch	·	740 m	MPC · JPL
650514	2012 QF_{8}	—	August 20, 2012	Črni Vrh	Mikuž, B.	·	2.6 km	MPC · JPL
650515	2012 QX_{8}	—	August 17, 2012	ESA OGS	ESA OGS	·	1.7 km	MPC · JPL
650516	2012 QL_{12}	—	August 17, 2012	Haleakala	Pan-STARRS 1	·	1.4 km	MPC · JPL
650517	2012 QP_{13}	—	August 16, 2012	Tenerife	ESA OGS	·	1.6 km	MPC · JPL
650518	2012 QN_{14}	—	October 9, 2007	Catalina	CSS	H	460 m	MPC · JPL
650519	2012 QS_{15}	—	September 17, 2006	Catalina	CSS	·	4.4 km	MPC · JPL
650520	2012 QA_{16}	—	August 7, 2004	Palomar	NEAT	·	1.7 km	MPC · JPL
650521	2012 QT_{16}	—	February 10, 2011	Mount Lemmon	Mount Lemmon Survey	·	1.3 km	MPC · JPL
650522	2012 QW_{18}	—	August 21, 2001	Kitt Peak	Spacewatch	·	2.0 km	MPC · JPL
650523	2012 QM_{19}	—	October 28, 2005	Mount Lemmon	Mount Lemmon Survey	·	1.6 km	MPC · JPL
650524	2012 QK_{20}	—	August 22, 2012	Haleakala	Pan-STARRS 1	·	810 m	MPC · JPL
650525	2012 QY_{20}	—	July 20, 2007	Lulin	LUSS	BRA	2.0 km	MPC · JPL
650526	2012 QK_{28}	—	August 24, 2012	Kitt Peak	Spacewatch	TEL	990 m	MPC · JPL
650527	2012 QJ_{29}	—	October 16, 2007	Mount Lemmon	Mount Lemmon Survey	·	1.4 km	MPC · JPL
650528	2012 QO_{29}	—	July 31, 2005	Palomar	NEAT	·	570 m	MPC · JPL
650529	2012 QA_{33}	—	August 20, 2006	Palomar	NEAT	·	3.1 km	MPC · JPL
650530	2012 QB_{34}	—	August 13, 2012	Haleakala	Pan-STARRS 1	NYS	990 m	MPC · JPL
650531	2012 QC_{39}	—	August 27, 2005	Palomar	NEAT	·	830 m	MPC · JPL
650532	2012 QK_{40}	—	August 12, 2012	Catalina	CSS	·	1.4 km	MPC · JPL
650533	2012 QX_{44}	—	October 3, 2002	Palomar	NEAT	·	810 m	MPC · JPL
650534	2012 QZ_{47}	—	August 14, 2012	Haleakala	Pan-STARRS 1	·	730 m	MPC · JPL
650535	2012 QG_{48}	—	August 13, 2012	Haleakala	Pan-STARRS 1	·	540 m	MPC · JPL
650536	2012 QV_{48}	—	February 4, 2005	Mount Lemmon	Mount Lemmon Survey	T_{j} (2.98)	3.1 km	MPC · JPL
650537	2012 QZ_{50}	—	November 9, 2009	Kitt Peak	Spacewatch	fast	730 m	MPC · JPL
650538	2012 QG_{52}	—	August 25, 2012	Alder Springs	Levin, K.	·	1.8 km	MPC · JPL
650539	2012 QW_{52}	—	September 10, 2007	Mount Lemmon	Mount Lemmon Survey	·	1.6 km	MPC · JPL
650540	2012 QB_{53}	—	November 6, 2008	Catalina	CSS	·	1.6 km	MPC · JPL
650541	2012 QE_{56}	—	August 26, 2012	Haleakala	Pan-STARRS 1	615	940 m	MPC · JPL
650542	2012 QW_{57}	—	August 13, 2012	Kitt Peak	Spacewatch	·	1.7 km	MPC · JPL
650543	2012 QU_{61}	—	July 2, 2005	Kitt Peak	Spacewatch	·	660 m	MPC · JPL
650544	2012 QH_{63}	—	October 10, 2007	Mount Lemmon	Mount Lemmon Survey	·	1.7 km	MPC · JPL
650545	2012 QV_{63}	—	August 16, 2012	Siding Spring	SSS	·	1.1 km	MPC · JPL
650546	2012 QQ_{64}	—	August 17, 2012	Haleakala	Pan-STARRS 1	·	590 m	MPC · JPL
650547	2012 QC_{66}	—	August 26, 2012	Haleakala	Pan-STARRS 1	·	1.6 km	MPC · JPL
650548	2012 QL_{66}	—	August 17, 2012	Haleakala	Pan-STARRS 1	H	380 m	MPC · JPL
650549	2012 QK_{69}	—	August 24, 2012	Kitt Peak	Spacewatch	EOS	1.5 km	MPC · JPL
650550	2012 QQ_{75}	—	August 26, 2012	Haleakala	Pan-STARRS 1	·	1.6 km	MPC · JPL
650551	2012 QY_{75}	—	October 12, 2007	Mount Lemmon	Mount Lemmon Survey	·	1.9 km	MPC · JPL
650552	2012 RF	—	December 9, 2002	Kitt Peak	Spacewatch	H	670 m	MPC · JPL
650553	2012 RO_{4}	—	October 9, 2007	Mount Lemmon	Mount Lemmon Survey	EOS	1.5 km	MPC · JPL
650554	2012 RD_{10}	—	September 24, 1995	Kitt Peak	Spacewatch	·	620 m	MPC · JPL
650555	2012 RN_{12}	—	September 21, 2001	Anderson Mesa	LONEOS	T_{j} (2.94)	3.3 km	MPC · JPL
650556	2012 RZ_{15}	—	August 11, 2001	Palomar	NEAT	·	1.2 km	MPC · JPL
650557	2012 RA_{16}	—	October 11, 2004	Palomar	NEAT	H	500 m	MPC · JPL
650558	2012 RB_{20}	—	September 15, 2012	La Sagra	OAM	·	2.1 km	MPC · JPL
650559	2012 RV_{21}	—	August 26, 2012	Haleakala	Pan-STARRS 1	·	1.5 km	MPC · JPL
650560	2012 RG_{23}	—	September 14, 2012	Kitt Peak	Spacewatch	·	790 m	MPC · JPL
650561	2012 RA_{25}	—	September 12, 2007	Catalina	CSS	·	1.6 km	MPC · JPL
650562	2012 RK_{25}	—	September 21, 2004	Socorro	LINEAR	MAR	1.1 km	MPC · JPL
650563	2012 RZ_{25}	—	June 22, 2004	Kitt Peak	Spacewatch	·	1.2 km	MPC · JPL
650564	2012 RB_{31}	—	August 28, 2005	Siding Spring	SSS	(2076)	650 m	MPC · JPL
650565	2012 RS_{35}	—	September 15, 2012	Kitt Peak	Spacewatch	·	1.6 km	MPC · JPL
650566	2012 RB_{37}	—	September 12, 2012	Siding Spring	SSS	·	590 m	MPC · JPL
650567	2012 RG_{37}	—	September 20, 2003	Kitt Peak	Spacewatch	·	2.0 km	MPC · JPL
650568	2012 RD_{39}	—	September 21, 2012	Mount Lemmon	Mount Lemmon Survey	KOR	1.2 km	MPC · JPL
650569	2012 RH_{41}	—	September 28, 2005	Palomar	NEAT	·	1.3 km	MPC · JPL
650570	2012 RU_{42}	—	October 7, 1999	Catalina	CSS	·	1.3 km	MPC · JPL
650571	2012 RA_{44}	—	September 14, 2012	Kitt Peak	Spacewatch	·	2.6 km	MPC · JPL
650572	2012 RK_{44}	—	September 18, 2003	Palomar	NEAT	·	2.0 km	MPC · JPL
650573	2012 RF_{45}	—	September 15, 2012	Charleston	R. Holmes	·	2.3 km	MPC · JPL
650574	2012 RC_{48}	—	September 6, 2012	Haleakala	Pan-STARRS 1	H	400 m	MPC · JPL
650575	2012 RU_{49}	—	November 5, 2007	Kitt Peak	Spacewatch	EOS	1.7 km	MPC · JPL
650576	2012 SC	—	September 30, 2005	Palomar	NEAT	·	930 m	MPC · JPL
650577	2012 SZ_{10}	—	October 11, 2007	Kitt Peak	Spacewatch	EOS	1.7 km	MPC · JPL
650578	2012 SJ_{20}	—	August 26, 2012	Haleakala	Pan-STARRS 1	·	600 m	MPC · JPL
650579	2012 SP_{20}	—	July 10, 2005	Kitt Peak	Spacewatch	V	490 m	MPC · JPL
650580	2012 SP_{21}	—	August 5, 2005	Palomar	NEAT	·	560 m	MPC · JPL
650581	2012 SY_{22}	—	September 14, 2012	Catalina	CSS	·	2.2 km	MPC · JPL
650582	2012 SY_{23}	—	September 30, 2005	Mount Lemmon	Mount Lemmon Survey	·	540 m	MPC · JPL
650583	2012 SG_{24}	—	September 26, 1998	Kitt Peak	Spacewatch	·	560 m	MPC · JPL
650584	2012 SD_{25}	—	September 17, 2012	Mount Lemmon	Mount Lemmon Survey	·	1.9 km	MPC · JPL
650585	2012 SS_{28}	—	September 19, 2001	Socorro	LINEAR	MAS	540 m	MPC · JPL
650586	2012 SG_{31}	—	December 7, 2008	Mount Lemmon	Mount Lemmon Survey	HOF	2.5 km	MPC · JPL
650587	2012 SO_{33}	—	September 13, 2012	Catalina	CSS	·	950 m	MPC · JPL
650588	2012 SF_{35}	—	February 9, 2010	Mount Lemmon	Mount Lemmon Survey	NYS	720 m	MPC · JPL
650589	2012 SO_{35}	—	August 26, 2012	Haleakala	Pan-STARRS 1	·	1.3 km	MPC · JPL
650590	2012 SO_{37}	—	August 16, 2002	Kitt Peak	Spacewatch	·	2.1 km	MPC · JPL
650591	2012 SY_{38}	—	October 11, 2007	Mount Lemmon	Mount Lemmon Survey	·	1.0 km	MPC · JPL
650592	2012 SU_{42}	—	September 18, 2012	Mount Lemmon	Mount Lemmon Survey	·	1.8 km	MPC · JPL
650593	2012 SL_{43}	—	September 18, 2012	Mount Lemmon	Mount Lemmon Survey	·	2.5 km	MPC · JPL
650594	2012 ST_{46}	—	September 22, 2012	Mount Lemmon	Mount Lemmon Survey	·	1.3 km	MPC · JPL
650595	2012 SZ_{46}	—	September 30, 2005	Anderson Mesa	LONEOS	(2076)	930 m	MPC · JPL
650596	2012 SC_{48}	—	October 29, 2008	Kitt Peak	Spacewatch	·	1.6 km	MPC · JPL
650597	2012 SR_{48}	—	October 19, 2003	Kitt Peak	Spacewatch	·	1.8 km	MPC · JPL
650598	2012 SB_{50}	—	September 23, 2012	Charleston	R. Holmes	H	470 m	MPC · JPL
650599	2012 ST_{50}	—	February 9, 2010	Mount Lemmon	Mount Lemmon Survey	·	790 m	MPC · JPL
650600	2012 SG_{51}	—	September 1, 2005	Kitt Peak	Spacewatch	·	860 m	MPC · JPL

== 650601–650700 ==
back to top

Designation			Discovery			Properties		Ref
Permanent	Provisional	Named after	Date	Site	Discoverer(s)	Category	Diam.	Ref
650601	2012 SN_{54}	—	September 19, 2012	Mount Lemmon	Mount Lemmon Survey	V	550 m	MPC · JPL
650602	2012 SO_{55}	—	July 26, 2001	Palomar	NEAT	·	2.6 km	MPC · JPL
650603	2012 SW_{56}	—	September 23, 2012	Catalina	CSS	·	2.0 km	MPC · JPL
650604	2012 SY_{59}	—	September 17, 2012	Kitt Peak	Spacewatch	·	2.7 km	MPC · JPL
650605	2012 SE_{61}	—	September 19, 2012	Mayhill-ISON	L. Elenin	·	2.1 km	MPC · JPL
650606	2012 SP_{62}	—	September 23, 2012	Mayhill-ISON	L. Elenin	GAL	1.8 km	MPC · JPL
650607	2012 SP_{68}	—	October 21, 2007	Mount Lemmon	Mount Lemmon Survey	·	1.6 km	MPC · JPL
650608	2012 SN_{69}	—	September 23, 2012	Mount Lemmon	Mount Lemmon Survey	V	610 m	MPC · JPL
650609	2012 SQ_{70}	—	September 21, 2012	Kitt Peak	Spacewatch	·	1.6 km	MPC · JPL
650610	2012 SV_{71}	—	May 26, 2006	Mount Lemmon	Mount Lemmon Survey	·	1.8 km	MPC · JPL
650611	2012 SY_{71}	—	September 11, 2007	Mount Lemmon	Mount Lemmon Survey	·	1.4 km	MPC · JPL
650612	2012 SF_{75}	—	September 13, 2007	Mount Lemmon	Mount Lemmon Survey	·	1.4 km	MPC · JPL
650613	2012 SP_{77}	—	September 24, 2012	Kitt Peak	Spacewatch	·	1.2 km	MPC · JPL
650614	2012 SS_{79}	—	September 17, 2012	Mount Lemmon	Mount Lemmon Survey	·	490 m	MPC · JPL
650615	2012 SS_{85}	—	September 22, 2012	Mount Lemmon	Mount Lemmon Survey	EOS	1.2 km	MPC · JPL
650616	2012 SP_{90}	—	September 16, 2012	Kitt Peak	Spacewatch	·	1.9 km	MPC · JPL
650617	2012 SR_{91}	—	September 16, 2012	Mount Lemmon	Mount Lemmon Survey	·	1.2 km	MPC · JPL
650618	2012 SW_{91}	—	September 18, 2012	Kitt Peak	Spacewatch	·	1.1 km	MPC · JPL
650619	2012 SG_{94}	—	September 22, 2012	Kitt Peak	Spacewatch	·	1.4 km	MPC · JPL
650620	2012 SJ_{94}	—	September 25, 2012	Kitt Peak	Spacewatch	·	1.9 km	MPC · JPL
650621	2012 SV_{94}	—	September 18, 2012	Mount Lemmon	Mount Lemmon Survey	·	2.1 km	MPC · JPL
650622	2012 SV_{98}	—	August 26, 2012	Haleakala	Pan-STARRS 1	·	1.7 km	MPC · JPL
650623	2012 SF_{99}	—	September 26, 2012	Mount Lemmon	Mount Lemmon Survey	EOS	1.6 km	MPC · JPL
650624	2012 SN_{99}	—	September 25, 2012	Mount Lemmon	Mount Lemmon Survey	·	1.3 km	MPC · JPL
650625	2012 TC_{2}	—	March 8, 2003	Palomar	NEAT	·	3.3 km	MPC · JPL
650626	2012 TC_{3}	—	September 15, 2012	Catalina	CSS	·	950 m	MPC · JPL
650627	2012 TJ_{3}	—	November 10, 2005	Kitt Peak	Spacewatch	NYS	700 m	MPC · JPL
650628	2012 TS_{3}	—	September 9, 2007	Mount Lemmon	Mount Lemmon Survey	·	2.0 km	MPC · JPL
650629	2012 TH_{5}	—	October 5, 2012	Haleakala	Pan-STARRS 1	L5	9.1 km	MPC · JPL
650630	2012 TE_{6}	—	October 21, 2001	Socorro	LINEAR	·	2.2 km	MPC · JPL
650631	2012 TN_{7}	—	September 10, 2012	Bergisch Gladbach	W. Bickel	·	890 m	MPC · JPL
650632	2012 TF_{8}	—	September 18, 2001	Anderson Mesa	LONEOS	EUP	2.5 km	MPC · JPL
650633	2012 TR_{8}	—	September 18, 2003	Kitt Peak	Spacewatch	·	1.2 km	MPC · JPL
650634	2012 TU_{8}	—	September 15, 2012	Kitt Peak	Spacewatch	·	830 m	MPC · JPL
650635	2012 TY_{8}	—	October 6, 2012	Mount Lemmon	Mount Lemmon Survey	·	2.5 km	MPC · JPL
650636	2012 TM_{11}	—	July 30, 2008	Mount Lemmon	Mount Lemmon Survey	MAS	580 m	MPC · JPL
650637	2012 TA_{13}	—	September 18, 2012	Kitt Peak	Spacewatch	ERI	1.4 km	MPC · JPL
650638	2012 TD_{13}	—	October 6, 2012	Haleakala	Pan-STARRS 1	HYG	2.1 km	MPC · JPL
650639	2012 TH_{15}	—	February 25, 2006	Kitt Peak	Spacewatch	H	560 m	MPC · JPL
650640	2012 TU_{16}	—	August 20, 2003	Palomar	NEAT	·	2.1 km	MPC · JPL
650641	2012 TQ_{17}	—	October 4, 2007	Kitt Peak	Spacewatch	·	1.1 km	MPC · JPL
650642	2012 TH_{18}	—	September 15, 2012	Mount Lemmon	Mount Lemmon Survey	NYS	1.1 km	MPC · JPL
650643	2012 TG_{25}	—	February 15, 2010	Mount Lemmon	Mount Lemmon Survey	·	890 m	MPC · JPL
650644	2012 TH_{26}	—	September 19, 2012	Mount Lemmon	Mount Lemmon Survey	·	2.3 km	MPC · JPL
650645	2012 TQ_{26}	—	October 6, 2012	Mount Lemmon	Mount Lemmon Survey	·	610 m	MPC · JPL
650646	2012 TV_{29}	—	August 14, 2001	Haleakala	NEAT	·	940 m	MPC · JPL
650647	2012 TY_{29}	—	September 25, 2012	Kitt Peak	Spacewatch	MAS	530 m	MPC · JPL
650648	2012 TJ_{30}	—	September 15, 2012	ESA OGS	ESA OGS	·	1.8 km	MPC · JPL
650649	2012 TP_{30}	—	November 9, 2007	Kitt Peak	Spacewatch	·	2.0 km	MPC · JPL
650650	2012 TM_{31}	—	September 13, 2012	La Sagra	OAM	V	550 m	MPC · JPL
650651	2012 TP_{31}	—	September 20, 2001	Socorro	LINEAR	·	1.1 km	MPC · JPL
650652	2012 TB_{34}	—	September 16, 2003	Kitt Peak	Spacewatch	·	1.3 km	MPC · JPL
650653	2012 TL_{35}	—	March 5, 2006	Catalina	CSS	H	530 m	MPC · JPL
650654	2012 TP_{42}	—	September 18, 2003	Palomar	NEAT	·	1.8 km	MPC · JPL
650655	2012 TT_{44}	—	October 31, 2002	Needville	J. Dellinger, W. G. Dillon	·	790 m	MPC · JPL
650656	2012 TO_{48}	—	September 14, 2007	Mount Lemmon	Mount Lemmon Survey	·	1.7 km	MPC · JPL
650657	2012 TP_{48}	—	March 13, 2011	Kitt Peak	Spacewatch	H	370 m	MPC · JPL
650658	2012 TT_{48}	—	October 8, 2012	Haleakala	Pan-STARRS 1	EOS	1.1 km	MPC · JPL
650659	2012 TX_{49}	—	October 8, 2012	Haleakala	Pan-STARRS 1	·	1.3 km	MPC · JPL
650660	2012 TH_{50}	—	May 22, 2001	Cerro Tololo	Deep Ecliptic Survey	·	1.8 km	MPC · JPL
650661	2012 TR_{53}	—	November 18, 2003	Palomar	NEAT	·	1.6 km	MPC · JPL
650662	2012 TZ_{58}	—	December 29, 2008	Mount Lemmon	Mount Lemmon Survey	·	1.4 km	MPC · JPL
650663	2012 TQ_{61}	—	October 8, 2012	Haleakala	Pan-STARRS 1	·	690 m	MPC · JPL
650664	2012 TR_{62}	—	October 8, 2012	Haleakala	Pan-STARRS 1	EOS	1.4 km	MPC · JPL
650665	2012 TN_{63}	—	October 8, 2012	Haleakala	Pan-STARRS 1	EOS	1.8 km	MPC · JPL
650666	2012 TC_{66}	—	October 8, 2012	Mount Lemmon	Mount Lemmon Survey	H	360 m	MPC · JPL
650667	2012 TO_{66}	—	October 8, 2012	Mount Lemmon	Mount Lemmon Survey	·	2.2 km	MPC · JPL
650668	2012 TJ_{67}	—	September 17, 2003	Palomar	NEAT	·	2.0 km	MPC · JPL
650669	2012 TQ_{72}	—	October 9, 2012	Mount Lemmon	Mount Lemmon Survey	·	1.4 km	MPC · JPL
650670	2012 TZ_{72}	—	October 12, 2007	Kitt Peak	Spacewatch	EOS	1.2 km	MPC · JPL
650671	2012 TA_{73}	—	October 9, 2012	Mount Lemmon	Mount Lemmon Survey	·	1.4 km	MPC · JPL
650672	2012 TY_{80}	—	September 17, 2012	Mount Lemmon	Mount Lemmon Survey	·	1.9 km	MPC · JPL
650673	2012 TH_{81}	—	October 5, 2012	Haleakala	Pan-STARRS 1	AST	1.4 km	MPC · JPL
650674	2012 TU_{82}	—	October 7, 2007	Mount Lemmon	Mount Lemmon Survey	·	1.6 km	MPC · JPL
650675	2012 TY_{83}	—	October 6, 2012	Mount Lemmon	Mount Lemmon Survey	·	1.6 km	MPC · JPL
650676	2012 TO_{84}	—	September 14, 2007	Mount Lemmon	Mount Lemmon Survey	KOR	1 km	MPC · JPL
650677	2012 TD_{85}	—	November 5, 2007	Kitt Peak	Spacewatch	EOS	1.5 km	MPC · JPL
650678	2012 TC_{86}	—	October 6, 2012	Kitt Peak	Spacewatch	·	1.9 km	MPC · JPL
650679	2012 TA_{89}	—	October 28, 2005	Catalina	CSS	·	860 m	MPC · JPL
650680	2012 TE_{94}	—	October 7, 2012	Haleakala	Pan-STARRS 1	·	490 m	MPC · JPL
650681	2012 TG_{95}	—	October 11, 2007	Kitt Peak	Spacewatch	·	2.0 km	MPC · JPL
650682	2012 TC_{98}	—	October 8, 2012	Kitt Peak	Spacewatch	·	2.1 km	MPC · JPL
650683	2012 TL_{99}	—	October 8, 2012	Kitt Peak	Spacewatch	·	900 m	MPC · JPL
650684	2012 TB_{101}	—	October 8, 2012	Pla D'Arguines	R. Ferrando, Ferrando, M.	TIR	2.6 km	MPC · JPL
650685	2012 TQ_{101}	—	October 17, 2001	Kitt Peak	Spacewatch	·	2.6 km	MPC · JPL
650686	2012 TP_{102}	—	April 29, 2011	Mount Lemmon	Mount Lemmon Survey	V	500 m	MPC · JPL
650687	2012 TY_{105}	—	October 9, 2012	Mount Lemmon	Mount Lemmon Survey	·	1.8 km	MPC · JPL
650688	2012 TQ_{106}	—	October 9, 2012	Mount Lemmon	Mount Lemmon Survey	·	500 m	MPC · JPL
650689	2012 TX_{106}	—	October 9, 2012	Haleakala	Pan-STARRS 1	·	570 m	MPC · JPL
650690	2012 TS_{107}	—	October 10, 2012	Mount Lemmon	Mount Lemmon Survey	·	2.0 km	MPC · JPL
650691	2012 TS_{109}	—	October 10, 2012	Mount Lemmon	Mount Lemmon Survey	PHO	670 m	MPC · JPL
650692	2012 TN_{111}	—	October 11, 2007	Kitt Peak	Spacewatch	·	1.9 km	MPC · JPL
650693	2012 TB_{112}	—	October 10, 2012	Mount Lemmon	Mount Lemmon Survey	·	590 m	MPC · JPL
650694	2012 TC_{116}	—	September 21, 2012	Kitt Peak	Spacewatch	·	1.6 km	MPC · JPL
650695	2012 TU_{117}	—	October 10, 2012	Mount Lemmon	Mount Lemmon Survey	·	1.9 km	MPC · JPL
650696	2012 TW_{117}	—	November 7, 2007	Mount Lemmon	Mount Lemmon Survey	·	1.7 km	MPC · JPL
650697	2012 TQ_{119}	—	September 25, 2012	Kitt Peak	Spacewatch	·	560 m	MPC · JPL
650698	2012 TO_{121}	—	October 12, 2007	Kitt Peak	Spacewatch	·	1.7 km	MPC · JPL
650699	2012 TY_{124}	—	July 25, 2011	Haleakala	Pan-STARRS 1	·	2.1 km	MPC · JPL
650700	2012 TM_{132}	—	August 10, 2012	Kitt Peak	Spacewatch	·	1.0 km	MPC · JPL

== 650701–650800 ==
back to top

Designation			Discovery			Properties		Ref
Permanent	Provisional	Named after	Date	Site	Discoverer(s)	Category	Diam.	Ref
650701	2012 TZ_{133}	—	October 5, 2012	Haleakala	Pan-STARRS 1	·	1.5 km	MPC · JPL
650702	2012 TF_{138}	—	September 15, 2012	ESA OGS	ESA OGS	EUN	930 m	MPC · JPL
650703	2012 TR_{138}	—	March 17, 2005	Mount Lemmon	Mount Lemmon Survey	·	900 m	MPC · JPL
650704	2012 TR_{142}	—	October 7, 2012	Haleakala	Pan-STARRS 1	·	1.8 km	MPC · JPL
650705	2012 TQ_{144}	—	December 4, 2007	Kitt Peak	Spacewatch	LIX	2.8 km	MPC · JPL
650706	2012 TU_{144}	—	October 11, 2012	Haleakala	Pan-STARRS 1	·	2.3 km	MPC · JPL
650707	2012 TK_{147}	—	December 29, 2005	Kitt Peak	Spacewatch	MAS	680 m	MPC · JPL
650708	2012 TK_{149}	—	August 11, 2008	La Sagra	OAM	MAS	620 m	MPC · JPL
650709	2012 TW_{150}	—	May 9, 2011	Mount Lemmon	Mount Lemmon Survey	·	940 m	MPC · JPL
650710	2012 TJ_{151}	—	February 13, 2010	Mount Lemmon	Mount Lemmon Survey	·	890 m	MPC · JPL
650711	2012 TG_{152}	—	October 8, 2012	Haleakala	Pan-STARRS 1	·	1.6 km	MPC · JPL
650712	2012 TU_{154}	—	September 19, 2007	Kitt Peak	Spacewatch	·	1.3 km	MPC · JPL
650713	2012 TA_{155}	—	October 21, 2007	Kitt Peak	Spacewatch	·	2.1 km	MPC · JPL
650714	2012 TL_{158}	—	October 8, 2012	Mount Lemmon	Mount Lemmon Survey	·	1.9 km	MPC · JPL
650715	2012 TX_{158}	—	March 6, 2011	Kitt Peak	Spacewatch	·	890 m	MPC · JPL
650716	2012 TK_{161}	—	November 15, 2003	Kitt Peak	Spacewatch	AGN	1.3 km	MPC · JPL
650717	2012 TO_{161}	—	September 18, 2012	Les Engarouines	L. Bernasconi	·	1.1 km	MPC · JPL
650718	2012 TQ_{165}	—	February 14, 2005	La Silla	A. Boattini	·	2.3 km	MPC · JPL
650719	2012 TN_{166}	—	March 29, 2011	Mount Lemmon	Mount Lemmon Survey	·	690 m	MPC · JPL
650720	2012 TJ_{168}	—	October 8, 2012	Haleakala	Pan-STARRS 1	·	880 m	MPC · JPL
650721	2012 TK_{168}	—	September 28, 2003	Apache Point	SDSS Collaboration	·	1.7 km	MPC · JPL
650722	2012 TT_{169}	—	November 20, 2007	Mount Lemmon	Mount Lemmon Survey	·	1.3 km	MPC · JPL
650723	2012 TB_{170}	—	October 8, 2012	Mount Lemmon	Mount Lemmon Survey	PHO	880 m	MPC · JPL
650724	2012 TX_{171}	—	December 31, 2008	Kitt Peak	Spacewatch	·	1.7 km	MPC · JPL
650725	2012 TF_{176}	—	October 9, 2012	Haleakala	Pan-STARRS 1	MAS	530 m	MPC · JPL
650726	2012 TA_{177}	—	October 8, 2012	Mount Lemmon	Mount Lemmon Survey	·	1.4 km	MPC · JPL
650727	2012 TM_{181}	—	October 8, 2012	Mount Lemmon	Mount Lemmon Survey	·	550 m	MPC · JPL
650728	2012 TQ_{182}	—	October 9, 2012	Haleakala	Pan-STARRS 1	·	1.5 km	MPC · JPL
650729	2012 TT_{183}	—	October 18, 2007	Kitt Peak	Spacewatch	·	2.0 km	MPC · JPL
650730	2012 TL_{185}	—	October 9, 2012	Haleakala	Pan-STARRS 1	NYS	650 m	MPC · JPL
650731	2012 TT_{186}	—	September 20, 2008	Catalina	CSS	·	1.0 km	MPC · JPL
650732	2012 TY_{187}	—	October 6, 2012	Catalina	CSS	·	1.6 km	MPC · JPL
650733	2012 TS_{188}	—	October 10, 2012	Mount Lemmon	Mount Lemmon Survey	·	1.6 km	MPC · JPL
650734	2012 TR_{193}	—	September 19, 2001	Socorro	LINEAR	NYS	890 m	MPC · JPL
650735	2012 TA_{196}	—	October 10, 2012	Kitt Peak	Spacewatch	·	1.9 km	MPC · JPL
650736	2012 TD_{198}	—	September 16, 2012	Kitt Peak	Spacewatch	·	2.2 km	MPC · JPL
650737	2012 TW_{198}	—	October 11, 2012	Kitt Peak	Spacewatch	EOS	1.3 km	MPC · JPL
650738	2012 TR_{199}	—	October 11, 2012	Nogales	M. Schwartz, P. R. Holvorcem	TIR	2.6 km	MPC · JPL
650739	2012 TM_{207}	—	October 11, 2012	Kitt Peak	Spacewatch	·	1.7 km	MPC · JPL
650740	2012 TS_{209}	—	October 11, 2012	Mount Lemmon	Mount Lemmon Survey	·	560 m	MPC · JPL
650741	2012 TW_{209}	—	October 11, 2012	Mount Lemmon	Mount Lemmon Survey	·	540 m	MPC · JPL
650742	2012 TG_{217}	—	October 27, 2005	Catalina	CSS	·	680 m	MPC · JPL
650743	2012 TD_{221}	—	October 16, 2007	Mount Lemmon	Mount Lemmon Survey	EOS	1.3 km	MPC · JPL
650744	2012 TK_{221}	—	October 4, 2012	Mount Lemmon	Mount Lemmon Survey	·	2.0 km	MPC · JPL
650745	2012 TM_{221}	—	September 21, 2012	Kitt Peak	Spacewatch	·	710 m	MPC · JPL
650746	2012 TG_{223}	—	October 14, 2012	Mount Lemmon	Mount Lemmon Survey	·	2.1 km	MPC · JPL
650747	2012 TH_{224}	—	October 15, 2012	Haleakala	Pan-STARRS 1	·	920 m	MPC · JPL
650748	2012 TX_{226}	—	October 7, 2012	Haleakala	Pan-STARRS 1	·	2.4 km	MPC · JPL
650749	2012 TN_{227}	—	April 7, 2003	Uccle	T. Pauwels	·	1.2 km	MPC · JPL
650750	2012 TP_{234}	—	November 2, 2007	Kitt Peak	Spacewatch	·	1.2 km	MPC · JPL
650751	2012 TL_{236}	—	December 18, 2007	Mount Lemmon	Mount Lemmon Survey	·	2.0 km	MPC · JPL
650752	2012 TX_{236}	—	October 9, 2007	Mount Lemmon	Mount Lemmon Survey	·	1.3 km	MPC · JPL
650753	2012 TN_{237}	—	December 1, 2008	Kitt Peak	Spacewatch	HOF	2.6 km	MPC · JPL
650754	2012 TC_{238}	—	January 3, 2009	Mount Lemmon	Mount Lemmon Survey	·	1.8 km	MPC · JPL
650755	2012 TE_{240}	—	October 8, 2012	Mount Lemmon	Mount Lemmon Survey	·	2.0 km	MPC · JPL
650756	2012 TA_{242}	—	October 1, 2005	Mount Lemmon	Mount Lemmon Survey	·	660 m	MPC · JPL
650757	2012 TO_{242}	—	October 8, 2012	Haleakala	Pan-STARRS 1	·	2.1 km	MPC · JPL
650758	2012 TP_{242}	—	October 8, 2012	Haleakala	Pan-STARRS 1	·	2.0 km	MPC · JPL
650759	2012 TE_{243}	—	October 8, 2012	Mount Lemmon	Mount Lemmon Survey	EOS	1.4 km	MPC · JPL
650760	2012 TQ_{244}	—	September 19, 1998	Apache Point	SDSS Collaboration	AGN	1.2 km	MPC · JPL
650761	2012 TC_{247}	—	October 31, 2007	Kitt Peak	Spacewatch	·	1.1 km	MPC · JPL
650762	2012 TG_{248}	—	September 17, 2012	Kitt Peak	Spacewatch	·	1.5 km	MPC · JPL
650763	2012 TA_{250}	—	November 15, 2007	Mount Lemmon	Mount Lemmon Survey	·	1.5 km	MPC · JPL
650764	2012 TO_{252}	—	October 11, 2012	Haleakala	Pan-STARRS 1	·	850 m	MPC · JPL
650765	2012 TK_{253}	—	February 20, 2009	Mount Lemmon	Mount Lemmon Survey	EOS	1.5 km	MPC · JPL
650766	2012 TE_{254}	—	October 11, 2012	Piszkéstető	K. Sárneczky	·	550 m	MPC · JPL
650767	2012 TB_{256}	—	December 1, 2005	Mount Lemmon	Mount Lemmon Survey	·	1.3 km	MPC · JPL
650768	2012 TW_{257}	—	October 18, 2001	Kitt Peak	Spacewatch	HYG	2.3 km	MPC · JPL
650769	2012 TZ_{257}	—	November 2, 2005	Cordell-Lorenz	D. T. Durig, Long, A. P.	·	800 m	MPC · JPL
650770	2012 TS_{259}	—	October 5, 2012	Haleakala	Pan-STARRS 1	·	2.0 km	MPC · JPL
650771	2012 TH_{261}	—	October 21, 2007	Mount Lemmon	Mount Lemmon Survey	·	2.1 km	MPC · JPL
650772	2012 TN_{263}	—	November 17, 2007	Kitt Peak	Spacewatch	·	1.6 km	MPC · JPL
650773	2012 TY_{263}	—	October 10, 2007	Kitt Peak	Spacewatch	·	1.5 km	MPC · JPL
650774	2012 TQ_{264}	—	October 10, 2007	Kitt Peak	Spacewatch	·	1.3 km	MPC · JPL
650775	2012 TA_{266}	—	October 8, 2012	Mount Lemmon	Mount Lemmon Survey	·	1.8 km	MPC · JPL
650776	2012 TB_{266}	—	November 5, 2005	Kitt Peak	Spacewatch	·	860 m	MPC · JPL
650777	2012 TR_{267}	—	October 8, 2012	Haleakala	Pan-STARRS 1	·	1.7 km	MPC · JPL
650778	2012 TN_{270}	—	October 11, 2012	Haleakala	Pan-STARRS 1	LEO	1.5 km	MPC · JPL
650779	2012 TH_{271}	—	October 23, 2003	Kitt Peak	Spacewatch	·	1.7 km	MPC · JPL
650780	2012 TR_{271}	—	April 30, 2011	Mount Lemmon	Mount Lemmon Survey	·	2.6 km	MPC · JPL
650781	2012 TB_{273}	—	October 16, 2007	Kitt Peak	Spacewatch	·	1.2 km	MPC · JPL
650782	2012 TE_{274}	—	September 23, 2012	Mount Lemmon	Mount Lemmon Survey	·	1.4 km	MPC · JPL
650783	2012 TG_{277}	—	November 15, 2007	Mount Lemmon	Mount Lemmon Survey	EOS	1.3 km	MPC · JPL
650784	2012 TK_{277}	—	October 16, 2007	Mount Lemmon	Mount Lemmon Survey	·	1.2 km	MPC · JPL
650785	2012 TN_{277}	—	October 11, 2012	Haleakala	Pan-STARRS 1	·	2.0 km	MPC · JPL
650786	2012 TY_{279}	—	October 11, 2012	Haleakala	Pan-STARRS 1	·	690 m	MPC · JPL
650787	2012 TK_{282}	—	October 11, 2012	Piszkéstető	K. Sárneczky	·	2.1 km	MPC · JPL
650788	2012 TM_{282}	—	December 12, 1996	Kitt Peak	Spacewatch	·	2.4 km	MPC · JPL
650789	2012 TM_{283}	—	January 28, 2007	Mount Lemmon	Mount Lemmon Survey	·	880 m	MPC · JPL
650790	2012 TS_{283}	—	September 11, 2001	Anderson Mesa	LONEOS	MAS	680 m	MPC · JPL
650791	2012 TC_{284}	—	October 30, 2007	Mount Lemmon	Mount Lemmon Survey	·	1.2 km	MPC · JPL
650792	2012 TD_{284}	—	November 18, 2007	Mount Lemmon	Mount Lemmon Survey	·	1.5 km	MPC · JPL
650793	2012 TT_{284}	—	October 15, 2012	Haleakala	Pan-STARRS 1	EOS	1.4 km	MPC · JPL
650794	2012 TQ_{285}	—	September 26, 2012	Mount Lemmon	Mount Lemmon Survey	·	2.1 km	MPC · JPL
650795	2012 TJ_{286}	—	October 8, 2012	Mount Lemmon	Mount Lemmon Survey	·	2.0 km	MPC · JPL
650796	2012 TR_{287}	—	December 30, 2008	Mount Lemmon	Mount Lemmon Survey	EOS	1.7 km	MPC · JPL
650797	2012 TG_{289}	—	October 10, 2012	Mount Lemmon	Mount Lemmon Survey	EOS	1.5 km	MPC · JPL
650798	2012 TN_{289}	—	October 10, 2012	Haleakala	Pan-STARRS 1	H	510 m	MPC · JPL
650799	2012 TW_{290}	—	September 1, 2008	La Sagra	OAM	MAS	680 m	MPC · JPL
650800	2012 TR_{291}	—	April 16, 2008	Mount Lemmon	Mount Lemmon Survey	EUP	3.0 km	MPC · JPL

== 650801–650900 ==
back to top

Designation			Discovery			Properties		Ref
Permanent	Provisional	Named after	Date	Site	Discoverer(s)	Category	Diam.	Ref
650801	2012 TU_{291}	—	August 28, 2012	Mount Lemmon	Mount Lemmon Survey	H	500 m	MPC · JPL
650802	2012 TZ_{291}	—	October 14, 2012	Kitt Peak	Spacewatch	·	2.2 km	MPC · JPL
650803	2012 TA_{292}	—	August 27, 2006	Kitt Peak	Spacewatch	EOS	1.6 km	MPC · JPL
650804	2012 TL_{292}	—	August 19, 2006	Kitt Peak	Spacewatch	·	2.3 km	MPC · JPL
650805	2012 TR_{292}	—	October 6, 2012	Kitt Peak	Spacewatch	·	2.5 km	MPC · JPL
650806	2012 TT_{292}	—	October 14, 2012	Kitt Peak	Spacewatch	·	2.4 km	MPC · JPL
650807	2012 TV_{292}	—	February 2, 2009	Mount Lemmon	Mount Lemmon Survey	·	1.9 km	MPC · JPL
650808	2012 TH_{293}	—	October 6, 2012	Kitt Peak	Spacewatch	EOS	1.8 km	MPC · JPL
650809	2012 TO_{293}	—	October 14, 2012	Kitt Peak	Spacewatch	·	2.1 km	MPC · JPL
650810	2012 TW_{295}	—	October 29, 2003	Kitt Peak	Spacewatch	AGN	1.3 km	MPC · JPL
650811	2012 TB_{298}	—	September 21, 2012	Kitt Peak	Spacewatch	·	1.5 km	MPC · JPL
650812	2012 TQ_{298}	—	October 16, 2001	Kitt Peak	Spacewatch	·	1.9 km	MPC · JPL
650813	2012 TT_{300}	—	October 7, 2012	Haleakala	Pan-STARRS 1	·	810 m	MPC · JPL
650814	2012 TC_{301}	—	October 25, 2005	Mount Lemmon	Mount Lemmon Survey	·	980 m	MPC · JPL
650815	2012 TG_{303}	—	October 21, 2001	Socorro	LINEAR	·	790 m	MPC · JPL
650816	2012 TW_{303}	—	May 3, 2011	Mayhill-ISON	L. Elenin	·	1.7 km	MPC · JPL
650817	2012 TH_{304}	—	July 6, 2003	Kitt Peak	Spacewatch	·	1.4 km	MPC · JPL
650818	2012 TQ_{304}	—	September 20, 2008	Mount Lemmon	Mount Lemmon Survey	V	600 m	MPC · JPL
650819	2012 TX_{305}	—	September 15, 2012	ESA OGS	ESA OGS	·	2.5 km	MPC · JPL
650820	2012 TK_{306}	—	October 6, 2012	Catalina	CSS	·	2.6 km	MPC · JPL
650821	2012 TD_{307}	—	September 19, 2012	Mount Lemmon	Mount Lemmon Survey	·	2.8 km	MPC · JPL
650822	2012 TS_{307}	—	January 7, 2010	Kitt Peak	Spacewatch	·	970 m	MPC · JPL
650823	2012 TA_{309}	—	October 31, 2005	Mount Lemmon	Mount Lemmon Survey	·	860 m	MPC · JPL
650824	2012 TZ_{310}	—	October 10, 2012	Nogales	M. Schwartz, P. R. Holvorcem	·	1.8 km	MPC · JPL
650825	2012 TG_{311}	—	November 19, 2008	Catalina	CSS	·	2.7 km	MPC · JPL
650826	2012 TH_{311}	—	October 21, 2001	Socorro	LINEAR	·	1.1 km	MPC · JPL
650827	2012 TB_{313}	—	June 22, 2006	Palomar	NEAT	·	3.6 km	MPC · JPL
650828	2012 TP_{314}	—	October 15, 2012	Kitt Peak	Spacewatch	EUN	1.8 km	MPC · JPL
650829	2012 TA_{315}	—	September 29, 2001	Palomar	NEAT	·	2.9 km	MPC · JPL
650830	2012 TB_{315}	—	September 22, 2003	Palomar	NEAT	·	2.0 km	MPC · JPL
650831	2012 TV_{315}	—	October 10, 2001	Palomar	NEAT	·	2.5 km	MPC · JPL
650832	2012 TC_{316}	—	October 11, 2012	Catalina	CSS	·	1.7 km	MPC · JPL
650833	2012 TM_{316}	—	October 13, 2012	Catalina	CSS	T_{j} (2.98)	4.8 km	MPC · JPL
650834	2012 TA_{318}	—	October 8, 2007	Kitt Peak	Spacewatch	·	2.7 km	MPC · JPL
650835	2012 TL_{318}	—	October 15, 2012	Catalina	CSS	·	1.7 km	MPC · JPL
650836	2012 TF_{321}	—	October 15, 2012	Catalina	CSS	·	1.0 km	MPC · JPL
650837	2012 TV_{323}	—	September 26, 2017	Haleakala	Pan-STARRS 1	·	1.5 km	MPC · JPL
650838	2012 TH_{325}	—	October 14, 2007	Mount Lemmon	Mount Lemmon Survey	·	2.1 km	MPC · JPL
650839	2012 TL_{325}	—	October 14, 2012	Kitt Peak	Spacewatch	·	1.8 km	MPC · JPL
650840	2012 TF_{326}	—	November 9, 2007	Mount Lemmon	Mount Lemmon Survey	EOS	1.8 km	MPC · JPL
650841	2012 TH_{326}	—	October 7, 2007	Mount Lemmon	Mount Lemmon Survey	·	1.9 km	MPC · JPL
650842	2012 TM_{326}	—	November 2, 2007	Mount Lemmon	Mount Lemmon Survey	·	1.4 km	MPC · JPL
650843	2012 TP_{326}	—	October 8, 2012	Haleakala	Pan-STARRS 1	·	2.0 km	MPC · JPL
650844	2012 TQ_{326}	—	December 17, 2007	Mount Lemmon	Mount Lemmon Survey	·	2.8 km	MPC · JPL
650845	2012 TO_{328}	—	October 8, 2012	Mount Lemmon	Mount Lemmon Survey	·	1.1 km	MPC · JPL
650846	2012 TZ_{328}	—	October 8, 2012	Haleakala	Pan-STARRS 1	·	1.8 km	MPC · JPL
650847	2012 TO_{329}	—	October 10, 2012	Kitt Peak	Spacewatch	·	2.4 km	MPC · JPL
650848	2012 TP_{329}	—	October 10, 2012	Mount Lemmon	Mount Lemmon Survey	EOS	1.3 km	MPC · JPL
650849	2012 TT_{331}	—	October 14, 2012	Catalina	CSS	·	2.0 km	MPC · JPL
650850	2012 TP_{332}	—	October 8, 2012	Haleakala	Pan-STARRS 1	EOS	1.4 km	MPC · JPL
650851	2012 TY_{332}	—	October 10, 2012	Mount Lemmon	Mount Lemmon Survey	·	1.7 km	MPC · JPL
650852	2012 TJ_{333}	—	October 13, 2012	Catalina	CSS	·	2.2 km	MPC · JPL
650853	2012 TX_{334}	—	January 28, 2015	Haleakala	Pan-STARRS 1	EOS	1.9 km	MPC · JPL
650854	2012 TY_{338}	—	October 8, 2012	Kitt Peak	Spacewatch	NYS	980 m	MPC · JPL
650855	2012 TZ_{340}	—	October 11, 2012	Haleakala	Pan-STARRS 1	·	1.5 km	MPC · JPL
650856	2012 TP_{344}	—	October 7, 2012	Haleakala	Pan-STARRS 1	·	720 m	MPC · JPL
650857	2012 TR_{344}	—	September 15, 2017	Haleakala	Pan-STARRS 1	·	2.1 km	MPC · JPL
650858	2012 TO_{347}	—	December 4, 2013	Haleakala	Pan-STARRS 1	EOS	1.8 km	MPC · JPL
650859	2012 TM_{349}	—	October 6, 2012	Mount Lemmon	Mount Lemmon Survey	·	2.3 km	MPC · JPL
650860	2012 TF_{355}	—	October 11, 2012	Mount Lemmon	Mount Lemmon Survey	·	660 m	MPC · JPL
650861	2012 TE_{357}	—	October 10, 2012	Haleakala	Pan-STARRS 1	·	2.9 km	MPC · JPL
650862	2012 TS_{357}	—	October 6, 2012	Haleakala	Pan-STARRS 1	V	490 m	MPC · JPL
650863	2012 TW_{357}	—	October 8, 2012	Kitt Peak	Spacewatch	·	2.4 km	MPC · JPL
650864	2012 TN_{363}	—	October 11, 2012	Haleakala	Pan-STARRS 1	V	530 m	MPC · JPL
650865	2012 TL_{365}	—	October 15, 2012	Haleakala	Pan-STARRS 1	EOS	1.4 km	MPC · JPL
650866	2012 TY_{368}	—	October 8, 2012	Haleakala	Pan-STARRS 1	·	820 m	MPC · JPL
650867	2012 TT_{370}	—	October 15, 2012	Haleakala	Pan-STARRS 1	·	2.0 km	MPC · JPL
650868	2012 TU_{372}	—	October 8, 2012	Haleakala	Pan-STARRS 1	·	2.1 km	MPC · JPL
650869	2012 TF_{374}	—	October 10, 2012	Mount Lemmon	Mount Lemmon Survey	·	1.9 km	MPC · JPL
650870	2012 TL_{379}	—	October 8, 2012	Mount Lemmon	Mount Lemmon Survey	·	820 m	MPC · JPL
650871	2012 TX_{379}	—	October 8, 2012	Haleakala	Pan-STARRS 1	·	2.6 km	MPC · JPL
650872	2012 TK_{385}	—	October 11, 2012	Haleakala	Pan-STARRS 1	KOR	1.1 km	MPC · JPL
650873	2012 TX_{386}	—	November 8, 2007	Kitt Peak	Spacewatch	·	2.4 km	MPC · JPL
650874	2012 TF_{388}	—	October 15, 2012	Kitt Peak	Spacewatch	·	2.5 km	MPC · JPL
650875	2012 TU_{392}	—	October 11, 2012	Haleakala	Pan-STARRS 1	·	1.5 km	MPC · JPL
650876	2012 TD_{404}	—	October 8, 2012	Haleakala	Pan-STARRS 1	EOS	1.2 km	MPC · JPL
650877	2012 UR_{1}	—	July 4, 2005	Mount Lemmon	Mount Lemmon Survey	·	490 m	MPC · JPL
650878	2012 UQ_{4}	—	March 2, 2009	Kitt Peak	Spacewatch	TIR	2.1 km	MPC · JPL
650879	2012 UX_{5}	—	February 14, 2007	Mauna Kea	P. A. Wiegert	·	770 m	MPC · JPL
650880	2012 UY_{5}	—	July 10, 2008	La Sagra	OAM	MAS	760 m	MPC · JPL
650881	2012 UJ_{7}	—	March 13, 2011	Kitt Peak	Spacewatch	·	820 m	MPC · JPL
650882	2012 UM_{9}	—	September 18, 2012	Kitt Peak	Spacewatch	·	2.0 km	MPC · JPL
650883	2012 UL_{10}	—	November 9, 2007	Mount Lemmon	Mount Lemmon Survey	·	2.0 km	MPC · JPL
650884	2012 UE_{13}	—	September 15, 2012	Mount Lemmon	Mount Lemmon Survey	·	1.7 km	MPC · JPL
650885	2012 UO_{13}	—	October 16, 2012	Mount Lemmon	Mount Lemmon Survey	AGN	1.1 km	MPC · JPL
650886	2012 UH_{21}	—	October 17, 2007	Mount Lemmon	Mount Lemmon Survey	·	1.2 km	MPC · JPL
650887	2012 UV_{21}	—	October 7, 2007	Kitt Peak	Spacewatch	EOS	1.4 km	MPC · JPL
650888	2012 UN_{22}	—	October 16, 2012	Mount Lemmon	Mount Lemmon Survey	·	2.5 km	MPC · JPL
650889	2012 UH_{23}	—	November 4, 2007	Kitt Peak	Spacewatch	EOS	1.6 km	MPC · JPL
650890	2012 UR_{25}	—	September 20, 2007	Kitt Peak	Spacewatch	DOR	1.9 km	MPC · JPL
650891	2012 UW_{26}	—	October 11, 2012	Piszkéstető	K. Sárneczky	·	3.2 km	MPC · JPL
650892	2012 UZ_{27}	—	September 16, 2012	Mount Lemmon	Mount Lemmon Survey	·	970 m	MPC · JPL
650893	2012 UV_{28}	—	October 22, 2003	Palomar	NEAT	·	2.5 km	MPC · JPL
650894	2012 UU_{29}	—	October 11, 2012	Piszkéstető	K. Sárneczky	·	2.1 km	MPC · JPL
650895	2012 UN_{30}	—	November 14, 1998	Kitt Peak	Spacewatch	·	690 m	MPC · JPL
650896	2012 UX_{32}	—	October 18, 2012	Haleakala	Pan-STARRS 1	·	3.1 km	MPC · JPL
650897	2012 UK_{34}	—	October 19, 2012	Mount Lemmon	Mount Lemmon Survey	H	500 m	MPC · JPL
650898	2012 UR_{36}	—	August 23, 2008	Kitt Peak	Spacewatch	·	1.0 km	MPC · JPL
650899	2012 UV_{37}	—	October 16, 2012	Mount Lemmon	Mount Lemmon Survey	·	2.2 km	MPC · JPL
650900	2012 UC_{39}	—	October 17, 2012	Kitt Peak	Spacewatch	·	2.2 km	MPC · JPL

== 650901–651000 ==
back to top

Designation			Discovery			Properties		Ref
Permanent	Provisional	Named after	Date	Site	Discoverer(s)	Category	Diam.	Ref
650901	2012 UE_{45}	—	March 14, 2005	Mount Lemmon	Mount Lemmon Survey	GEF	1.5 km	MPC · JPL
650902	2012 UL_{45}	—	October 10, 2007	Kitt Peak	Spacewatch	·	1.4 km	MPC · JPL
650903	2012 UD_{46}	—	October 18, 2012	Haleakala	Pan-STARRS 1	NYS	790 m	MPC · JPL
650904	2012 UW_{47}	—	April 3, 2010	Kitt Peak	Spacewatch	·	1.7 km	MPC · JPL
650905	2012 UM_{50}	—	September 20, 2001	Kitt Peak	Spacewatch	·	1.7 km	MPC · JPL
650906	2012 UQ_{53}	—	October 19, 2012	Mount Lemmon	Mount Lemmon Survey	·	2.9 km	MPC · JPL
650907	2012 UD_{54}	—	October 6, 2008	Mount Lemmon	Mount Lemmon Survey	·	1.2 km	MPC · JPL
650908	2012 UU_{54}	—	November 16, 2001	Kitt Peak	Deep Lens Survey	·	1.9 km	MPC · JPL
650909	2012 UX_{55}	—	October 19, 2012	Haleakala	Pan-STARRS 1	·	990 m	MPC · JPL
650910	2012 UE_{56}	—	July 26, 2003	Palomar	NEAT	·	1.4 km	MPC · JPL
650911	2012 UH_{57}	—	October 21, 2003	Kitt Peak	Spacewatch	·	1.6 km	MPC · JPL
650912	2012 UF_{58}	—	August 21, 2008	Kitt Peak	Spacewatch	·	1.1 km	MPC · JPL
650913	2012 US_{60}	—	October 20, 2012	Kitt Peak	Spacewatch	·	1.4 km	MPC · JPL
650914	2012 UF_{66}	—	October 16, 2012	Kitt Peak	Spacewatch	·	2.3 km	MPC · JPL
650915	2012 UR_{66}	—	October 16, 2012	Kitt Peak	Spacewatch	·	2.7 km	MPC · JPL
650916	2012 UM_{67}	—	October 20, 2012	Haleakala	Pan-STARRS 1	·	2.4 km	MPC · JPL
650917	2012 UA_{72}	—	September 29, 2005	Mount Lemmon	Mount Lemmon Survey	·	540 m	MPC · JPL
650918	2012 UK_{72}	—	October 11, 2012	Haleakala	Pan-STARRS 1	NYS	680 m	MPC · JPL
650919	2012 UL_{73}	—	October 30, 2007	Mount Lemmon	Mount Lemmon Survey	KOR	1.1 km	MPC · JPL
650920	2012 UJ_{75}	—	October 10, 2012	Kitt Peak	Spacewatch	HYG	2.1 km	MPC · JPL
650921	2012 UJ_{76}	—	February 7, 2003	La Silla	Barbieri, C.	THM	1.7 km	MPC · JPL
650922	2012 UW_{78}	—	October 19, 2012	Haleakala	Pan-STARRS 1	·	2.4 km	MPC · JPL
650923	2012 UY_{80}	—	November 3, 2007	Mount Lemmon	Mount Lemmon Survey	·	2.1 km	MPC · JPL
650924	2012 UJ_{82}	—	November 8, 2007	Kitt Peak	Spacewatch	EOS	1.5 km	MPC · JPL
650925	2012 UQ_{83}	—	October 20, 2012	Kitt Peak	Spacewatch	·	2.7 km	MPC · JPL
650926	2012 UO_{86}	—	September 10, 2007	Mount Lemmon	Mount Lemmon Survey	·	1.6 km	MPC · JPL
650927	2012 UP_{87}	—	October 15, 2012	Mount Lemmon	Mount Lemmon Survey	·	2.7 km	MPC · JPL
650928	2012 UP_{88}	—	July 30, 2008	Kitt Peak	Spacewatch	MAS	660 m	MPC · JPL
650929	2012 UU_{88}	—	October 14, 2001	Kitt Peak	Spacewatch	·	1.9 km	MPC · JPL
650930	2012 UD_{91}	—	October 10, 2007	Mount Lemmon	Mount Lemmon Survey	·	1.9 km	MPC · JPL
650931	2012 UV_{91}	—	October 16, 2012	Mount Lemmon	Mount Lemmon Survey	·	2.6 km	MPC · JPL
650932	2012 UN_{92}	—	October 16, 2012	Mount Lemmon	Mount Lemmon Survey	·	2.1 km	MPC · JPL
650933	2012 UO_{92}	—	August 18, 2006	Kitt Peak	Spacewatch	·	2.6 km	MPC · JPL
650934	2012 UP_{92}	—	October 16, 2012	Mount Lemmon	Mount Lemmon Survey	·	2.4 km	MPC · JPL
650935	2012 UX_{92}	—	August 24, 2006	Palomar	NEAT	·	2.5 km	MPC · JPL
650936	2012 UV_{97}	—	November 3, 2007	Kitt Peak	Spacewatch	·	1.9 km	MPC · JPL
650937	2012 UB_{98}	—	January 31, 2009	Kitt Peak	Spacewatch	EOS	1.8 km	MPC · JPL
650938	2012 UA_{101}	—	October 18, 2012	Haleakala	Pan-STARRS 1	·	2.2 km	MPC · JPL
650939	2012 UX_{101}	—	December 4, 2007	Mount Lemmon	Mount Lemmon Survey	THM	1.7 km	MPC · JPL
650940	2012 UK_{102}	—	October 18, 2012	Haleakala	Pan-STARRS 1	·	1.9 km	MPC · JPL
650941	2012 UW_{102}	—	September 26, 2012	Mount Lemmon	Mount Lemmon Survey	·	1.7 km	MPC · JPL
650942	2012 UL_{105}	—	October 15, 2012	Kitt Peak	Spacewatch	·	1.5 km	MPC · JPL
650943	2012 UR_{105}	—	January 3, 2009	Kitt Peak	Spacewatch	·	2.1 km	MPC · JPL
650944	2012 UZ_{106}	—	November 12, 2005	Kitt Peak	Spacewatch	·	820 m	MPC · JPL
650945	2012 UJ_{107}	—	October 10, 2008	Mount Lemmon	Mount Lemmon Survey	·	1.5 km	MPC · JPL
650946	2012 UR_{109}	—	February 1, 2009	Kitt Peak	Spacewatch	·	1.8 km	MPC · JPL
650947	2012 UJ_{110}	—	October 10, 2002	Kitt Peak	Spacewatch	·	650 m	MPC · JPL
650948	2012 UA_{111}	—	October 7, 2012	Kitt Peak	Spacewatch	·	2.4 km	MPC · JPL
650949	2012 UK_{112}	—	October 15, 2012	Kitt Peak	Spacewatch	·	1.7 km	MPC · JPL
650950	2012 UE_{117}	—	October 8, 2012	Kitt Peak	Spacewatch	EOS	1.4 km	MPC · JPL
650951	2012 UG_{118}	—	September 16, 2012	Mount Lemmon	Mount Lemmon Survey	·	2.7 km	MPC · JPL
650952	2012 UU_{118}	—	October 22, 2012	Kitt Peak	Spacewatch	·	2.2 km	MPC · JPL
650953	2012 UU_{119}	—	October 22, 2012	Haleakala	Pan-STARRS 1	EOS	1.8 km	MPC · JPL
650954	2012 UO_{120}	—	July 19, 2001	Palomar	NEAT	·	1.0 km	MPC · JPL
650955	2012 UU_{121}	—	December 18, 2007	Mount Lemmon	Mount Lemmon Survey	·	1.8 km	MPC · JPL
650956	2012 UF_{122}	—	October 22, 2012	Haleakala	Pan-STARRS 1	·	1.8 km	MPC · JPL
650957	2012 UQ_{124}	—	October 22, 2012	Haleakala	Pan-STARRS 1	·	2.1 km	MPC · JPL
650958	2012 UA_{126}	—	December 18, 2007	Mount Lemmon	Mount Lemmon Survey	·	1.8 km	MPC · JPL
650959	2012 UA_{128}	—	October 17, 2012	Mount Lemmon	Mount Lemmon Survey	·	840 m	MPC · JPL
650960	2012 UF_{128}	—	October 22, 2012	Mount Lemmon	Mount Lemmon Survey	·	1.4 km	MPC · JPL
650961	2012 UM_{129}	—	October 19, 2012	Mount Lemmon	Mount Lemmon Survey	EOS	1.6 km	MPC · JPL
650962	2012 UO_{130}	—	October 17, 2012	Mount Lemmon	Mount Lemmon Survey	·	980 m	MPC · JPL
650963	2012 UB_{134}	—	October 11, 2012	Piszkéstető	K. Sárneczky	·	1.9 km	MPC · JPL
650964	2012 UE_{134}	—	May 5, 2006	Mount Lemmon	Mount Lemmon Survey	H	500 m	MPC · JPL
650965	2012 UH_{137}	—	November 2, 2005	Mount Lemmon	Mount Lemmon Survey	·	780 m	MPC · JPL
650966	2012 UP_{137}	—	July 29, 2008	Kitt Peak	Spacewatch	·	870 m	MPC · JPL
650967	2012 UT_{139}	—	October 10, 2012	Mount Lemmon	Mount Lemmon Survey	·	740 m	MPC · JPL
650968	2012 UC_{144}	—	October 18, 2012	Haleakala	Pan-STARRS 1	V	630 m	MPC · JPL
650969	2012 UP_{145}	—	October 14, 2012	Catalina	CSS	HYG	2.2 km	MPC · JPL
650970	2012 UE_{146}	—	October 11, 2012	Piszkéstető	K. Sárneczky	·	2.2 km	MPC · JPL
650971	2012 UQ_{148}	—	October 26, 2001	Kitt Peak	Spacewatch	V	530 m	MPC · JPL
650972	2012 UC_{149}	—	October 21, 2012	Kitt Peak	Spacewatch	·	2.3 km	MPC · JPL
650973	2012 UR_{151}	—	October 21, 2012	Kitt Peak	Spacewatch	MAS	560 m	MPC · JPL
650974	2012 UH_{154}	—	October 22, 2012	Mount Lemmon	Mount Lemmon Survey	·	840 m	MPC · JPL
650975	2012 UZ_{154}	—	October 8, 2012	Mount Lemmon	Mount Lemmon Survey	EOS	1.9 km	MPC · JPL
650976	2012 UO_{155}	—	October 27, 2005	Kitt Peak	Spacewatch	·	610 m	MPC · JPL
650977	2012 UW_{156}	—	April 28, 2011	Haleakala	Pan-STARRS 1	V	650 m	MPC · JPL
650978	2012 UD_{157}	—	October 17, 2012	Mount Lemmon	Mount Lemmon Survey	·	1.2 km	MPC · JPL
650979	2012 UX_{158}	—	September 14, 2006	Kitt Peak	Spacewatch	·	2.1 km	MPC · JPL
650980	2012 UX_{160}	—	December 6, 2007	Mount Lemmon	Mount Lemmon Survey	·	1.8 km	MPC · JPL
650981	2012 UB_{161}	—	October 14, 2004	Palomar	NEAT	·	1.7 km	MPC · JPL
650982	2012 UB_{162}	—	September 19, 2001	Socorro	LINEAR	·	730 m	MPC · JPL
650983	2012 UV_{164}	—	August 22, 2006	Palomar	NEAT	·	2.8 km	MPC · JPL
650984	2012 UD_{165}	—	October 23, 2012	Haleakala	Pan-STARRS 1	·	1.7 km	MPC · JPL
650985	2012 UL_{166}	—	December 30, 2011	Mount Lemmon	Mount Lemmon Survey	L4	10 km	MPC · JPL
650986	2012 UO_{166}	—	September 25, 2012	Catalina	CSS	·	1.1 km	MPC · JPL
650987	2012 UY_{166}	—	October 18, 2012	Mount Lemmon	Mount Lemmon Survey	·	2.6 km	MPC · JPL
650988	2012 UP_{167}	—	November 1, 2007	Kitt Peak	Spacewatch	·	2.1 km	MPC · JPL
650989	2012 UE_{168}	—	November 17, 2007	Catalina	CSS	·	1.3 km	MPC · JPL
650990	2012 UG_{168}	—	October 15, 2012	Catalina	CSS	·	2.9 km	MPC · JPL
650991	2012 UL_{170}	—	October 19, 2012	Haleakala	Pan-STARRS 1	·	2.5 km	MPC · JPL
650992	2012 UY_{172}	—	October 25, 2012	Piszkés-tető	K. Sárneczky, G. Hodosán	·	2.7 km	MPC · JPL
650993	2012 UC_{173}	—	October 25, 2012	Piszkés-tető	K. Sárneczky, T. Vorobjov	·	1.5 km	MPC · JPL
650994	2012 UN_{174}	—	October 31, 2012	Haleakala	Pan-STARRS 1	H	520 m	MPC · JPL
650995	2012 UL_{178}	—	October 16, 2012	Kitt Peak	Spacewatch	·	1.3 km	MPC · JPL
650996	2012 UG_{179}	—	November 9, 2007	Mount Lemmon	Mount Lemmon Survey	·	2.4 km	MPC · JPL
650997	2012 UV_{180}	—	September 18, 2012	Mount Lemmon	Mount Lemmon Survey	TIR	2.9 km	MPC · JPL
650998	2012 UP_{181}	—	October 18, 2012	Haleakala	Pan-STARRS 1	·	2.8 km	MPC · JPL
650999	2012 UW_{183}	—	November 25, 2005	Catalina	CSS	PHO	1.1 km	MPC · JPL
651000	2012 UM_{184}	—	October 17, 2012	Mount Lemmon	Mount Lemmon Survey	·	1.6 km	MPC · JPL

back to top

== Meaning of names ==
As minor planet discoveries are confirmed, they are given a permanent number by the IAU's Minor Planet Center (MPC), and the discoverers can then submit names for them, following the IAU's naming conventions. The list below concerns those minor planets in the specified number-range that have received names, and explains the meanings of those names.

Official naming citations of newly named small Solar System bodies are approved and published in a bulletin by IAU's Working Group for Small Bodies Nomenclature (WGSBN). Before May 2021, citations were published in MPC's Minor Planet Circulars for many decades. Recent citations can also be found on the JPL Small-Body Database (SBDB). Until his death in 2016, German astronomer Lutz D. Schmadel compiled these citations into the Dictionary of Minor Planet Names (DMP) and regularly updated the collection.

Based on Paul Herget's The Names of the Minor Planets, Schmadel also researched the unclear origin of numerous asteroids, most of which had been named prior to World War II. This article incorporates text from this source, which is in the public domain: SBDB New namings may only be added to this list below after official publication as the preannouncement of names is condemned. The WGSBN publishes a comprehensive guideline for the naming rules of non-cometary small Solar System bodies.

Named minor planet	Provisional	This minor planet was named for...	Ref · Catalog
650474 Chungchaocheng	2012 MJ_{9}	Chung Chao-cheng (Hakka Chinese: Zung seu-ziin, 1925–2020), known as the Mother of Modern Taiwanese Literature.	IAU · 650474
