= Muddy Torrent Trilogy =

Muddy Torrent Trilogy (濁流三部曲) is a Taiwanese epic novel written by Hakka author Chung Chao-cheng. It was created from 1961 to 1963 and falls under the autobiographical novel genre. The trilogy intricately depicts the social changes under the influence of a colossal era, solidifying his position as an "epic novelist".

== Plot ==
The protagonist is named Lu Chih-lung. The first part narrates his struggles facing the dual pressures of colonial policies and the education system. The second part describes his experiences during the late stages of the Pacific War and the period of Japan's unconditional surrender, including his studies and conscription as an apprentice soldier. The third part portrays Lu Chih-lung's post-war period, breaking away from Japanese militarism and readapting to Chinese culture, life, and language.

== Reception ==
Literary scholar Chen Chang-ming commented that Muddy Torrent Trilogy is the origin of Taiwanese epic novels, a historical epic that writes about the nation's suffering. Another notable feature of this work is the presentation of the colonial experience. Through the protagonist, it reflects the contradictory identity views of intellectuals from the Japanese rule period to the early post-war period. Chen Fang-ming, another literary researcher, said, "Chung Chao-cheng's artistic achievement is fully demonstrated in the rendering of epic novels. Through the depiction of family history, he outlined the destiny of the entire Taiwanese people. Chung Chao-cheng's recognition in Taiwanese literary history is undoubtedly due to his completion of two huge works, namely Muddy Torrent Trilogy and Trilogy of Taiwanese People (臺灣人三部曲)."

The novel reflects personal experiences and the influence of the government's literary policies at the time of its creation. Chung Chao-cheng noted that the anti-Japanese theme in the book was encouraged by the government during that period, aligning with the themes that he could effectively explore.
