= Chung Chao-cheng =

Taiwanese writer (1925–2020)

Chung Chao-cheng (Chinese: 鍾肇政; Hakka Pha̍k-fa-sṳ: Chûng Sau-chṳn; Taiwanese Pe̍h-ōe-jī: Cheng Tiāu-chèng; 20 January 1925 – 16 May 2020) was a Taiwanese novelist of Hakka descent born in the Hsinchu Prefecture during the Japanese rule period (now part of Lungtan District, Taoyuan City). Revered as the "Mother of Taiwanese Literature" in Taiwan, he is also frequently mentioned alongside Taiwanese writer Yeh Shih-tao, collectively known as "North Chung, South Yeh".

== Early life ==
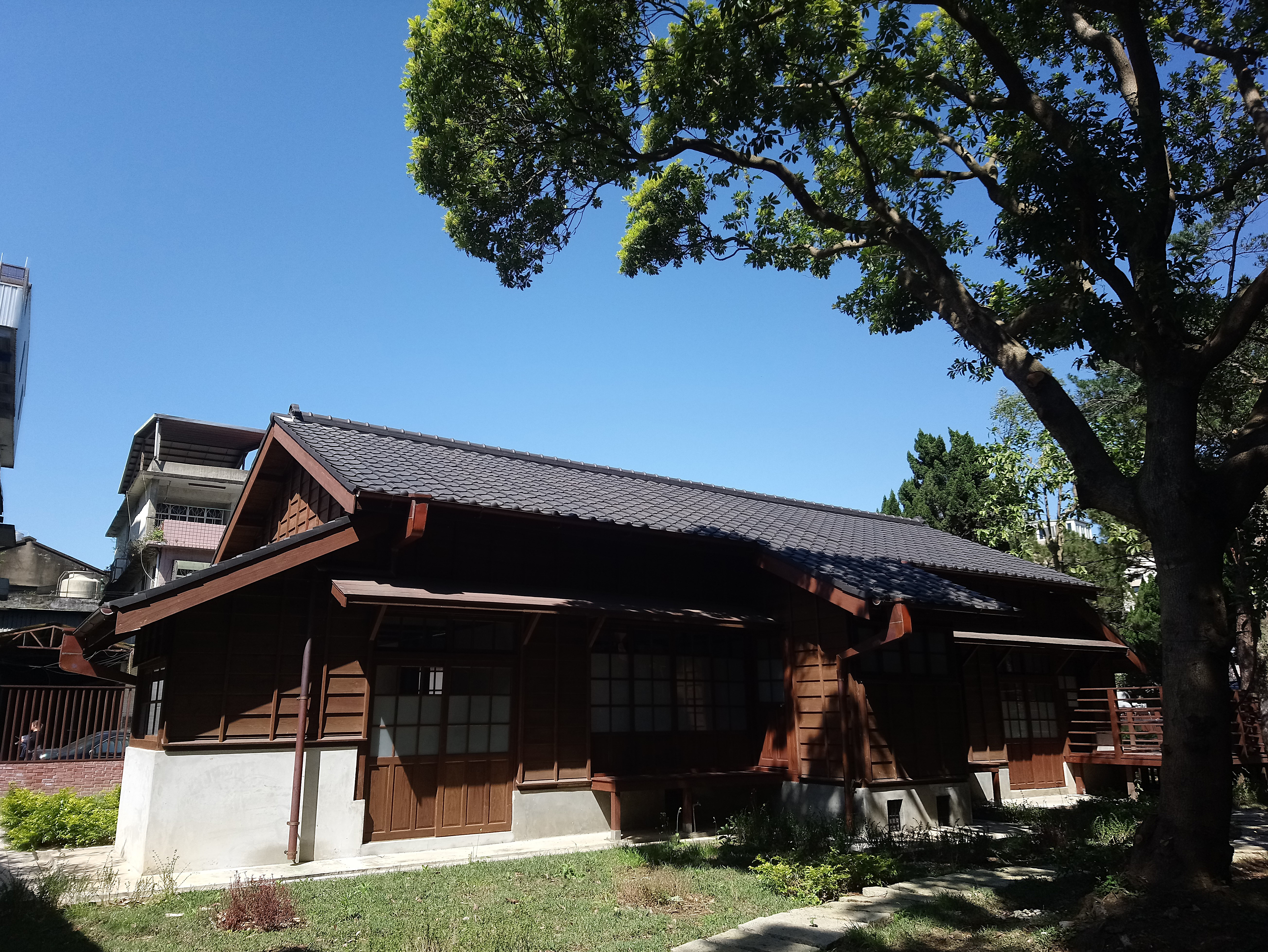
The Japanese-style dormitory at Longtan Elementary School, where Chung Chao-cheng worked as a primary school teacher, has been renamed as the "Chong Chao-cheng Literature Life Park Resident Workstation".

Chung was born on 20 January 1925, in Longtan District, Taoyuan. Under Japanese rule, the subdivision was classified as a village by the name of Ryūtan, itself a part of Daikei, in Shinchiku Prefecture. His father was a schoolteacher and principal. Chung was sixth of ten siblings, and the only son. He enrolled successively at the Tamkang Middle School and then the Changhua Normal School, and later studied at National Taiwan University, but did not complete a degree in the Department of Chinese Language and Literature, due to a bout of malaria. He learned to speak Taiwanese Hokkien at an early age, and was educated in the Japanese language. Chung taught at Longtan Elementary School until 1979, switching from Hakka to teaching in Mandarin at the request of the Kuomintang-led government. His knowledge of languages made Chung a member of the translingual generation.

== Career ==
His first work was published in 1951, within the pages of the magazine Rambler. His first novel appeared as a serial within United Daily News, and over the course of his career, Chung published over thirty novels. In 1961, he published the Muddy Torrent Trilogy (濁流三部曲), a landmark in Taiwanese epic novel writing, establishing him as the first author of Taiwanese epic novels. He paid meticulous attention to the depiction of desire, a recurrent theme in his works. In 2002, at the age of seventy, he began writing The Passionate Goethe (歌德激情書), exploring the erotic world within the mind of the German literary giant Goethe.

From 1957 to 1958, he collaborated with a group of enthusiastic Taiwanese writers to publish Literary Friends Communications (文友通訊). During this time, many writers from the Japanese rule period faced challenges with language transition due to the change in political power, starting to learn to write in Chinese again. Literary Friends Communications provided a platform for these writers to create and mutually encourage each other in their literary pursuits.

In addition to his creative work, Chung actively highlighted the achievements of Taiwanese predecessors. Starting from the late 1970s, he participated in various activities promoting and establishing memorial halls for many Taiwanese writers, showing concern for the literary environment and cultural development, including Chung Li-He Museum. After martial law was lifted, he actively engaged in social movements, advocating for the rights of the Hakka community in Taiwan, including the "Restore Our Mother Tongue Movement", and the founding of the Taiwan Hakka Association for Public Affairs and the Formosa Hakka Radio.

His literary output also includes many essays, over 150 short stories, and more than forty works translated from Japanese. He promoted Taiwan nativist literature. Known as the doyen of Taiwanese literature, Chung's novel The Dull Ice Flower was adapted into a Golden Horse-winning film released in 1989. He was a recipient of both the Wu San-lien Literary Award and the National Literary Award, among others. Chung fell the week before his death, and subsequently lapsed in and out of consciousness. He died on 16 May 2020 at home in Taoyuan.

Chung received the Order of Brilliant Star with Grand Cordon in 2000 from the Lee Teng-hui presidential administration. Lee's successor Chen Shui-bian awarded Chung the Order of Propitious Clouds with Grand Cordon in 2004. Posthumously, the Order of Brilliant Star with Special Grand Cordon was conferred upon Chung, alongside a presidential citation from Tsai Ing-wen.

== See also ==
- Muddy Water Trilogy
- List of Taiwanese authors
