= Asian Academy Creative Award for Best Actress in a Leading Role =

Award for lead actress

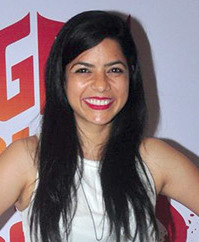
- The 2023 recipient: Rajshri Deshpande
- Awarded for: Best lead actress
- Country: Asia–Pacific region
- Presented by: Asian Academy Creative Awards
- First award: 2018
- Currently held by: Rajshri Deshpande, Trial by Fire (2023)
- Website: asianacademycreativeawards.com

This is a list of the winners of the Asian Academy Creative Award for Best Actress in a Leading Role since its institution in 2018. The award is presented to the best leading actress performance in a television series or film. Apart from the main award, the category is also awarded regionally in seventeen participating nations.

== Winners ==
The following table display the winners of the award.

Year	Actress	Program	Network	Country	Ref.
2018	Adinia Wirasti	Critical Eleven	HOOQ	Indonesia	
2019	Shefali Shah	Delhi Crime	Netflix	India	
2020	Yeo Yann Yann	Invisible Stories: LIAN	HBO Asia	Singapore	
2021	Konkona Sen Sharma	Ajeeb Daastaans	Netflix	India	
2022	Jodi Sta. Maria	The Broken Marriage Vow	ABS-CBN	Philippines	
2023	Rajshri Deshpande	Trial by Fire	Netflix	India	
2024	Susan Lankester	RainTown	Current Pictures	Malaysia	
2025	Yuriyan Retriever	The Queen of Villains	Netflix	Japan	

=== Regional winners ===
The following table display the winners of the regional award, sorted by the participating nations.

==== Australia ====
Year	Actress	Program	Network
2018	Marta Dusseldorp	A Place to Call Home	Showcase
2022	Rarriwuy Hick	True Colours	SBS/NITV
2023	Aisha Dee	Safe Home	SBS

==== China ====
Year	Actress	Program	Network
2019	Zhou Xun	Ruyi's Royal Love in the Palace	Tencent Video
2021	Song Yi	My Heroic Husband	iQIYI
2023	Zhao Liying	Wild Bloom	iQIYI

==== Hong Kong ====
Year	Actress	Program	Network
2019	Kara Wai	The Defected	TVB
2021	Stephy Tang	We are the Littles	ViuTV
2022	Louise Wong	Anita	Disney+
2023	Rosina Lam	Speakers of Law	TVB

==== India ====
Year	Actress	Program	Network
2018	Radhika Apte	Sacred Games	Netflix
2019	Shefali Shah	Delhi Crime	Netflix
2020	Aahana Kumra	Marzi	Voot
2021	Konkona Sen Sharma	Ajeeb Daastaans	Netflix
2022	Sakshi Tanwar	Mai: A Mother's Rage	Netflix
2023	Rajshri Deshpande	Trial by Fire	Netflix

==== Indonesia ====
Year	Actress	Program	Network
2018	Adinia Wirasti	Critical Eleven	HOOQ
2019	Adinia Wirasti	Grisse	HBO Asia
2020	Eyka Farhana	Pretty Little Liars	Viu
2021	Amanda Manopo	The Ties of Love	RCTI
2022	Indah Permatasari	Wedding Agreement the Series	Disney+ Hotstar
2023	Adinia Wirasti	Kamu Tidak Sendiri	MNC

==== Japan ====
Year	Actress	Program	Network
2018	Yuko Takeuchi	Miss Sherlock	Hulu Japan
2019	Misuzu Kanno	Folklore: Tatami	HBO Asia
2021	Misato Morita	The Naked Director	Netflix
2023	Ryoko Yonekura	Angel Flight	Amazon Prime Video

==== Malaysia ====
Year	Actress	Program	Network
2018	Lisa Surihani	Kontena Ana	Astro Citra
2019	Emily Chan	The Promise	8TV
2020	Rebecca Lim	The Bridge	Viu
2021	Siti Saleha	Black	Viu
2022	Nad Zainal	Dendam Seorang Isteri	Astro Prima
2023	Tiz Zaqyah	Liar	Astro Ria

==== Myanmar ====
Year	Actress	Program	Network
2019	Wutt Hmone Shwe Yi	The Only Mom	Brave Empire
2020	Pan Yaung Chel	Lake Pyar	Canal+
2023	Pan Yaung Chel	Grieving Moe	Mahar TV

==== New Zealand ====
Year	Actress	Program	Network
2021	Rima Te Wiata	The Tender Trap	Greenstone TV

==== Philippines ====
Year	Actress	Program	Network
2018	Maja Salvador	Wildflower	ABS-CBN
2019	Nadine Lustre	Ulan	HOOQ
2021	Maja Salvador	Niña Niño	TV5
2022	Jodi Sta. Maria	The Broken Marriage Vow	ABS-CBN
2023	Heaven Peralejo	A Silent Night	Amazon Prime Video

==== Singapore ====
Year	Actress	Program	Network
2018	Oon Shu An	How to Be a Good Girl	HOOQ
2019	Jojo Goh Lee Chen	From Beijing to Moscow	Toggle
2020	Yeo Yann Yann	Invisible Stories: LIAN	HBO Asia
2021	Felicia Chin	A Jungle Survivor	Mediacorp
2022	Rebecca Lim	This Land Is Mine	Mediacorp
2023	Jernelle Oh	Cash on Delivery	Channel 8

==== South Korea ====
Year	Actress	Program	Network
2021	Lee Si-young	Sweet Home	Netflix
2022	Kim Hye-soo	Juvenile Justice	Netflix
2023	Song Hye-kyo	The Glory	Netflix

==== Taiwan ====
Year	Actress	Program	Network
2018	Huang Pei-jia	Roseki	Hakka TV
2019	Alyssa Chia	The World Between Us	PTS
2020	Cammy Chiang	Dancing to Silence	Da Ai Television
2021	Hsu Yen-ling	The Child of Light	Hakka TV
2022	Cheryl Yang	Light the Night	Netflix
2023	Hsieh Ying-xuan	Wave Makers	Netflix

==== Thailand ====
Year	Actress	Program	Network
2019	Nittha Jirayungyurn	7 Days	HOOQ
2020	Khemanit Jamikorn	Mother	Line TV
2021	Chicha Amatayakul	Girl from Nowhere	Netflix
2022	Prapakorn Chairak	Remember 15	Viu
2023	Tontawan Tantivejakul	10 Years Ticket	GMMTV

==== Vietnam ====
Year	Actress	Program	Network
2021	Khả Ngân	Secrets of the Wind	FPT TV
2022	Le Ngoc Minh Hang	Tiger Mom	K+
