= Asian Academy Creative Award for Best Actor in a Leading Role =

Award for lead actor

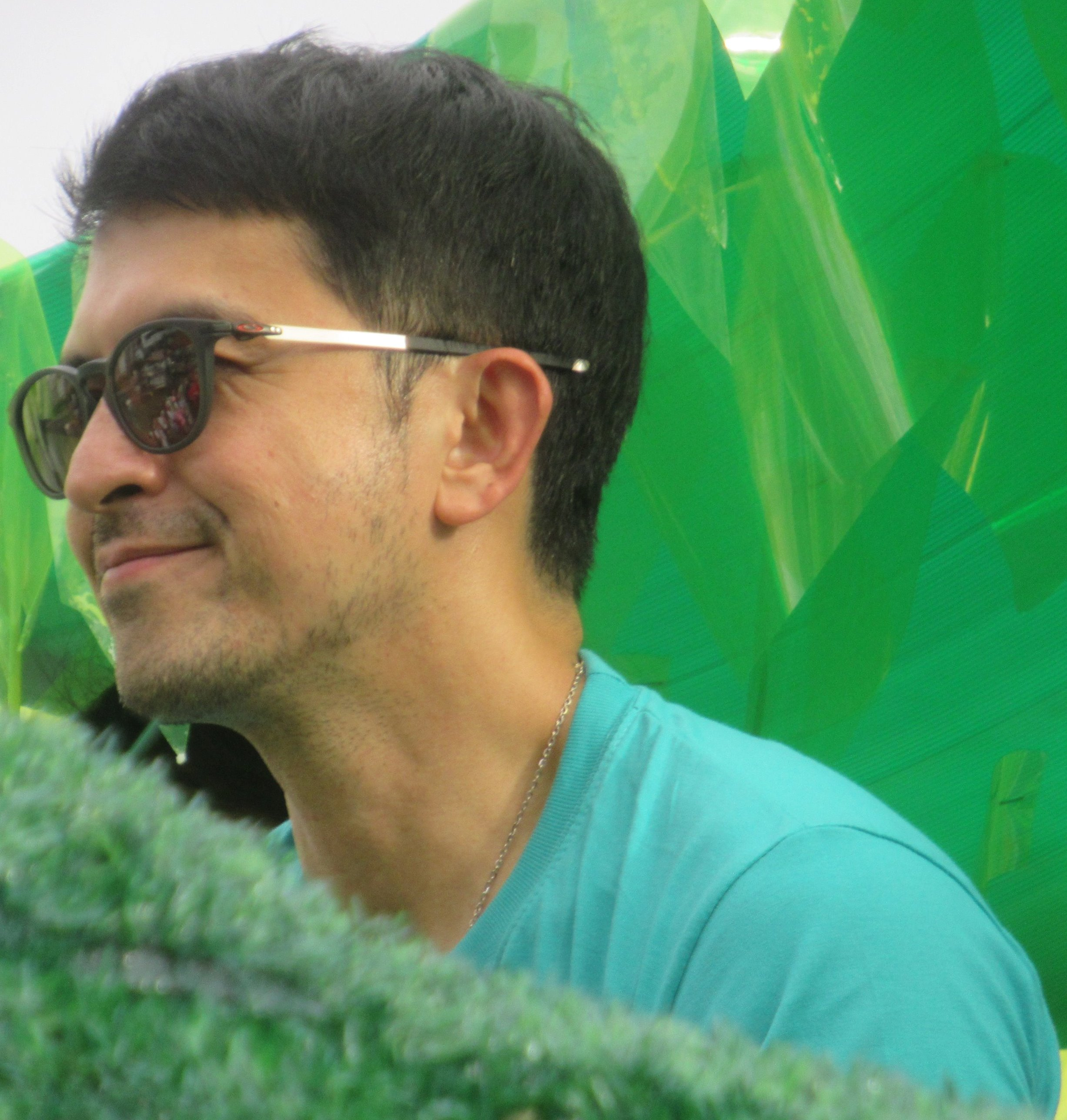
- The 2025 recipient: Dennis Trillo
- Awarded for: Best lead actor
- Country: Asia–Pacific region
- Presented by: Asian Academy Creative Awards
- First award: 2018
- Currently held by: Dennis Trillo , Green Bones (2025)
- Website: asianacademycreativeawards.com

This is a list of the winners of the Asian Academy Creative Award for Best Actor in a Leading Role since its institution in 2018. The award is presented to the best leading actor performance in a television series or film. Apart from the main award, the category is also awarded regionally in seventeen participating nations.

== Winners ==
The following table display the winners of the award.

Year	Actor	Program	Network	Country	Ref.
2018	Yu Hewei	Drug Hunter	Dragon Television	China	
2019	Oka Antara	Brata	HOOQ	Indonesia	
2020	Arjo Atayde	Bagman	ABS-CBN	Philippines	
2021	Lee Je-hoon	Move to Heaven	Netflix	South Korea	
2022	Jung Hae-in	D.P.	Netflix	South Korea	
2023	Vijay Varma	Dahaad	Amazon Prime Video	India	
2024	Ryohei Suzuki	City Hunter	Netflix	Japan	
2025	Dennis Trillo	Green Bones	GMA Pictures	Philippines	

=== Regional winners ===
The following table display the winners of the regional award, sorted by the participating nations.

==== Australia ====
Year	Actor	Program	Network
2022	Yoson An	New Gold Mountain	SBS
2024	Felix Cameron	Boy Swallows Universe	Netflix
2025	Jacob Elordi	The Narrow Road to the Deep North	Curio Pictures
2026	Hunter Page-Lochard	Reckless	BBC Studios Productions

==== China ====
Year	Actor	Program	Network
2018	Yu Hewei	Drug Hunter	Dragon Television
2019	Nie Yuan	Story of Yanxi Palace	IQIYI
2020	Luo Jin	Royal Nirvana	Youku
2021	Guo Qilin	My Heroic Husband	IQIYI
2022	Vic Chou	Danger Zone	IQIYI
2023	Ren Jialun	Thousand Years for You	IQIYI
2024	Qin Hao	The Lonely Warrior	IQIYI
2025	Li Xian	A Love Never Lost	Five Pictures
2026	Bai Yu	Swords Into Plowshares	China Huace Film

==== Hong Kong ====
Year	Actor	Program	Network
2018	Eason Chan	My Very Short Marriage	ViuTV
2019	Francis Ng	The Trading Floor	Star Chinese Movies
2020	Anthony Wong	The Republic	Viu
2022	Kenneth Ma	Kids' Lives Matter	TVB
2023	Ruco Chan	I've Got the Power	TVB
2024	Owen Cheung	No Room For Crime	TVB
2025	Owen Cheung	Anonymous Signal	TVB
2026	Raymond Wong Ho-yin	Game of Two Halves	Viu

==== India ====
Year	Actor	Program	Network
2018	Nawazuddin Siddiqui	Sacred Games	Netflix
2019	Sumedh Mudgalkar	RadhaKrishn	Star Bharat
2020	Manoj Bajpayee	The Family Man	Amazon Prime Video
2021	Manoj Bajpayee	The Family Man	Amazon Prime Video
2022	Guru Somasundaram	Minnal Murali	Netflix
2023	Vijay Varma	Dahaad	Amazon Prime Video
2024	Kay Kay Menon	The Railway Men	Netflix
2025	Zahan Kapoor	The Black Warrant	Netflix
2026	Anil Kapoor	Subedar	Amazon Prime Video

==== Indonesia ====
Year	Actor	Program	Network
2018	Reza Rahadian	Critical Eleven	HOOQ
2019	Oka Antara	Brata	HOOQ
2020	Miller Khan	Assalamualaikum Calon Imam	Viu
2021	Arya Saloka	The Ties of Love	RCTI
2022	Refal Hady	Wedding Agreement the Series	Disney+ Hotstar
2023	Abimana Aryasatya	Serigala Terakhir	Vidio
2024	Jefri Nichol	At Stake The Series	Vidio
2025	Arya Saloka	Lembayung	Prime Eagle Studio
2026	Angga Yunanda	Para Perasuk	Rekata Studio

==== Japan ====
Year	Actor	Program	Network
2018	Tetsuji Tamayama	You Are Tender When It Rains	Hulu Japan
2019	Kazuki Kitamura	Folklore: Tatami	HBO Asia
2021	Takayuki Yamada	The Naked Director	Netflix
2022	Masaki Suda	Don't Call It Mystery	Fuji Television
2024	Ryohei Suzuki	City Hunter	Netflix
2025	Tsuyoshi Kusanagi	Bullet Train Explosion	Netflix
2026	Yuki Yamada	Chiruran: Shinsengumi Requiem	HBO Asia

==== Malaysia ====
Year	Actor	Program	Network
2018	Idan Aedan	Luar Biasa	Astro Citra
2019	Lingkesvaran Manlam	Brindhavanathil Kannan	Astro
2020	Bront Palarae	The Bridge	Viu
2021	Kamal Adli	Black	Viu
2022	Beto Kusyairy	Scammer	Astro Ria
2023	Khir Rahman	Hilang	Viu
2024	Naim Daniel	I.D	Astro Malaysia
2025	Dato' Hilal Azman	Memori	Creative Stew
2026	Beto Kusyairy	Good Boys Go to Heaven	Astro Shaw

==== Myanmar ====
Year	Actor	Program	Network
2020	Khar Ra	Spirit of Fight	Canal+
2023	Aye Chan Maung	Grieving Moe	Mahar TV

==== New Zealand ====
Year	Actor	Program	Network
2021	Ido Drent	The Gulf	Three

==== Philippines ====
Year	Actor	Program	Network
2018	Miguel Tanfelix	Kambal, Karibal	GMA Network
2019	Carlo Aquino	Ulan	HOOQ
2020	Arjo Atayde	Bagman	ABS-CBN
2021	JM de Guzman	When Love Burns	ABS-CBN
2022	John Arcilla	On the Job	HBO Asia
2023	Arjo Atayde	Cattleya Killer	ABS-CBN
2024	Kokoy de Santos	Your Mother's Son	Octobertrain
2025	Dennis Trillo	Green Bones	GMA Pictures
2026	Vice Ganda	Call Me Mother	ABS-CBN

==== Singapore ====
Year	Actor	Program	Network
2018	A. Panneeirchelvam	Ninaivugal	Mediacorp
2019	River Huang	From Beijing to Moscow	Toggle
2020	Zhang Yaodong	Day Break	Channel 8
2021	Nathaniel Ng	My Mini-Me and Me	Mediacorp
2022	Pierre Png	This Land Is Mine	meWatch
2023	Andie Chen	Third Rail	meWatch
2024	Desmond Tan	All That Glitters	Mediacorp
2025	Richie Koh	Coded Love	Mediacorp
2026	Ayden Sng	Double Helix	Viu

==== South Korea ====
Year	Actor	Program	Network
2021	Lee Je-hoon	Move to Heaven	Netflix
2022	Jung Hae-in	D.P.	Netflix
2023	Ha Jung-woo	Narco-Saints	Netflix

==== Taiwan ====
Year	Actor	Program	Network
2018	Jag Huang	Burning Crows	Hakka TV
2019	Wu Kang-ren	The World Between Us	PTS
2020	Hsia Ching-ting	The Story of Three Springs	Formosa Television
2021	Mark Lee	Looking for You	Da Ai Television
2022	Kou Hsi-Shun	Still Me	CTS
2023	Liu Kuan-ting	On Marriage: Wishful Synching	PTS
2024	Wu Kang-ren	Living	TVBS Media
2025	Vic Chou	The World Between Us: After the Flames	PTS
2026	Chang Hsiao Chuan	Dogman	PTS

==== Thailand ====
Year	Actor	Program	Network
2019	Jirayu Tangsrisuk	Krong Kam	Channel 3
2020	Prin Suparat	My Husband in Law	Channel 3
2021	Korapat Kirdpan	The Gifted: Graduation	GMM 25
2022	Chanon Santinatornkul	Wannabe	Viu
2023	Nopachai Jayanama	Hunger	Netflix
2024	Vachirawit Chivaaree	Congrats My Ex!	Amazon Prime Video
2025	Natara Nopparatayapon	Mad Unicorn	Netflix
2026	Norawit Titicharoenrak	Ticket to Heaven	GMM 25

==== Vietnam ====
Year	Actor	Program	Network
2019	Song Luan	Descendants of the Sun	VTC
2021	Trần Quốc Anh	Secrets of the Wind	FPT TV
