= Asian Academy Creative Award for Best Actress in a Supporting Role =

Award for supporting actor

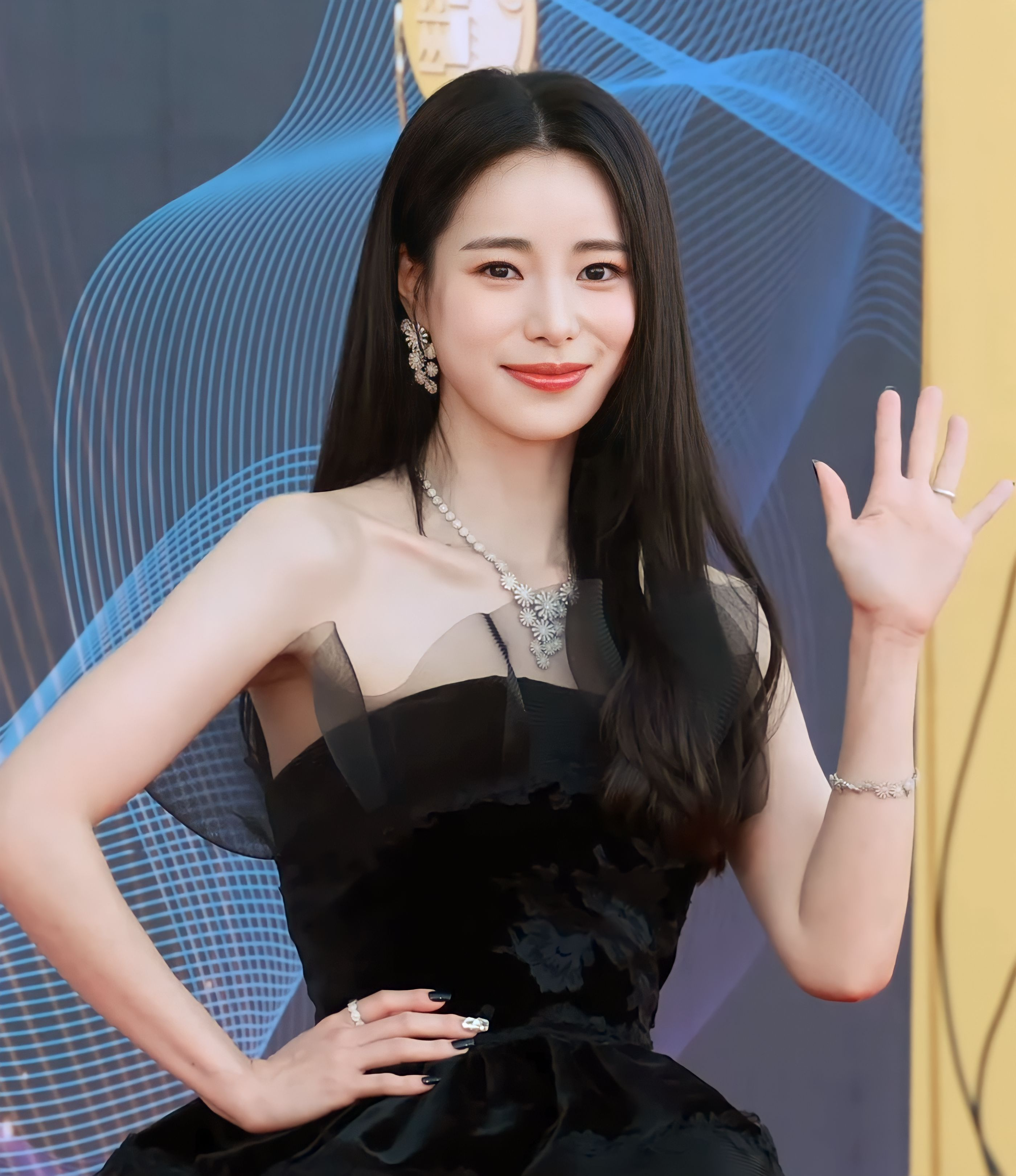
- The 2023 recipient: Lim Ji-yeon
- Awarded for: Best supporting actress
- Country: Asia–Pacific region
- Presented by: Asian Academy Creative Awards
- First award: 2018
- Currently held by: Ivory Chia, Emerald Hill - The Little Nyonya Story (2025)
- Website: asianacademycreativeawards.com

This is a list of the winners of the Asian Academy Creative Award for Best Actress in a Supporting Role since its institution in 2018. The award is presented to the best supporting actress performance in a television series or film. Apart from the main award, the category is also awarded regionally in seventeen participating nations.

== Winners ==
The following table display the winners of the award.

Year	Actor	Program	Network	Country	Ref.
2018	Candy Yang	Roseki	Hakka TV	Taiwan	
2019	Pyae Pyae	The Only Mom	Brave Empire	Myanmar	
2020	Lina Ng	Last Madame	Mediacorp	Singapore	
2021	Amruta Subhash	Bombay Begums	Netflix	India	
2022	Liou Yin-shang	Still Me	CTS	Taiwan	
2023	Lim Ji-yeon	The Glory	Netflix	South Korea	
2024	Yeom Hye-ran	Mask Girl	Netflix	South Korea	
2025	Ivory Chia	Emerald Hill - The Little Nyonya Story	Mediacorp	Singapore	

=== Regional winners ===
The following table display the winners of the regional award, sorted by the participating nations.

==== Australia ====
Year	Actor	Program	Network
2019	Deborah Mailman	Mystery Road	ABC
2022	Mabel Li	New Gold Mountain	SBS
2024	Sophie Wilde	Boy Swallows Universe	Netflix
2025	Aisha Dee	Apple Cider Vinegar	Netflix
2026	Alice Englert	Star City	Apple TV

==== China ====
Year	Actor	Program	Network
2025	He Ruixian	Feud	IQIYI
2026	Qin Hailu	The Lead	Tencent Video

==== Hong Kong ====
Year	Actor	Program	Network
2019	Sisley Choi	The Defected	TVB
2022	Elaine Yiu	The Righteous Fists	TVB
2023	Tiffany Lau	The Invisibles	TVB
2024	Yanny Chan	Tales at the Corner	Viu
2025	Yoyo Chen	D.I.D. 12	TVB
2026	Alice Chan	Themis	TVB

==== India ====
Year	Actor	Program	Network
2018	Rajshri Deshpande	Sacred Games	Netflix
2019	Mona Ambegaonkar	Bhak	HOOQ
2021	Amruta Subhash	Bombay Begums	Netflix
2022	Kirti Kulhari	Human	Disney+ Hotstar
2023	Shefali Shah	Darlings	Netflix
2024	Kritika Kamra	Bombay My Beloved	Amazon Prime Video
2025	Garima Vikrant Singh	Gram Chikitsalay	Amazon Prime Video
2026	Jyothika	System	Amazon Prime Video

==== Indonesia ====
Year	Actor	Program	Network
2018	Poppy Sovia	The Publicist	Viu
2019	Lutesha	Halustik	Viu
2020	Wulan Guritno	Pretty Little Liars	Viu
2022	Susan Sameh	Wedding Agreement the Series	Disney+ Hotstar
2023	Roweina Umboh	Mantan Tapi Menikah	Viu
2024	Hana Malasan	Queen of Justice	Vidio
2025	Amara Sophie	Sugar Daddy	Viu
2026	Lukita Maxwell	Shrinking	Apple TV

==== Japan ====
Year	Actor	Program	Network
2018	Shihori Kanjiya	Miss Sherlock	Hulu Japan
2021	Yuri Tsunematsu	The Naked Director	Netflix
2023	Honoka Matsumoto	Angel Flight	Amazon Prime Video
2025	Erika Karata	The Queen of Villains	Netflix

==== Malaysia ====
Year	Actor	Program	Network
2018	Yoke Chen	Where Got Money?	Astro AEC
2019	Joanne Kam	Grisse	HBO Asia
2020	Aida Aris	The Bridge	Viu
2021	Nabila Huda	Black	Viu
2022	Shaza Bae	Nusyuz Berkiblat Cinta	Astro Ria
2023	Siti Saleha	Hilang	Viu
2024	Joey Leong	The Queen's Ploy	Astro Malaysia
2025	Sharifah Sakinah	Curang Tanpa Niat	Astro Malaysia
2026	Sofia Jane	Malam Terlarang	Infinitus Productions

==== Myanmar ====
Year	Actor	Program	Network
2019	Pyae Pyae	The Only Mom	Brave Empire
2020	Ku Ku Zin Aung	Stranger's House	Good Old Days
2023	Su Htat	Brew Me a Favor	Canal+

==== Philippines ====
Year	Actor	Program	Network
2018	Kyline Alcantara	Kambal, Karibal	GMA Network
2019	Dimples Romana	Kadenang Ginto	ABS-CBN
2021	Sylvia Sanchez	Huwag Kang Mangamba	ABS-CBN
2022	Dimples Romana	Viral Scandal	ABS-CBN
2023	Sue Ramirez	K-Love	Viu
2024	Kaila Estrada	Deceit	Dreamscape Entertainment
2025	Dimples Romana	The Caretaker	Rein Entertainment

==== Singapore ====
Year	Actor	Program	Network
2018	Christina Kydoniefs	Tanglin	Channel 5
2019	Cynthia Koh	Say Cheese	Channel 8
2020	Lina Ng	Last Madame	meWatch
2021	Cynthia Koh	My Star Bride	Channel 8
2022	Kayly Loh	Sister Stand Tall	Channel 8
2023	Min Ji Oh	Last Madame: Sisters of the Night	meWatch
2024	Lynn Lim	Kill Sera Sera	Mediacorp
2025	Ivory Chia	Emerald Hill - The Little Nyonya Story	Mediacorp
2026	Priscelia Chan	Old & Dangerous	WaWa Pictures

==== South Korea ====
Year	Actor	Program	Network
2021	Go Min-si	Sweet Home	Netflix
2022	Lee Jung-eun	Juvenile Justice	Netflix
2023	Lim Ji-yeon	The Glory	Netflix
2024	Yeom Hye-ran	Mask Girl	Netflix
2025	Youn Yuh-jung	Pachinko Season 2	Apple TV+

==== Taiwan ====
Year	Actor	Program	Network
2018	Candy Yang	Roseki	Hakka TV
2019	Lee Chien-na	The Mouse Serves a Guest Tea	Formosa Television
2020	Moon Lee	The Victims' Game	Netflix
2021	Esther Liu	Mother to Be	Sanlih E-Television
2022	Liou Yin-shang	Still Me	CTS
2023	Gingle Wang	Wave Makers	Netflix
2024	Dee Hsu	At the Moment	Netflix
2025	Fang Wen-lin	Though Dead, Still Alive	Taigi TV Station
2026	Su Yan-Pei	The Mother of the Tofu Family	Formosa TV

==== Thailand ====
Year	Actor	Program	Network
2019	Pitchapa Phanthumchinda	Krong Kam	Channel 3
2020	Machida Sutthikulphanich	Mother	Line TV
2021	Cherreen Nutjaree Horvejkul	Voice in the Rain	Viu
2022	Venita Loywattanakul	Remember 15	Viu
2023	Venita Loywattanakul	Get Rich	Viu
2024	Prapakorn Chairak	The Outing	Viu
2025	Kanyarat Ruangrung	Hide & Sis	GMM 25
2026	Tipnaree Weerawatnodom	Enigma Black Stage	One 31
