= Asian Academy Creative Award for Best Actor in a Supporting Role =

Award for supporting actor

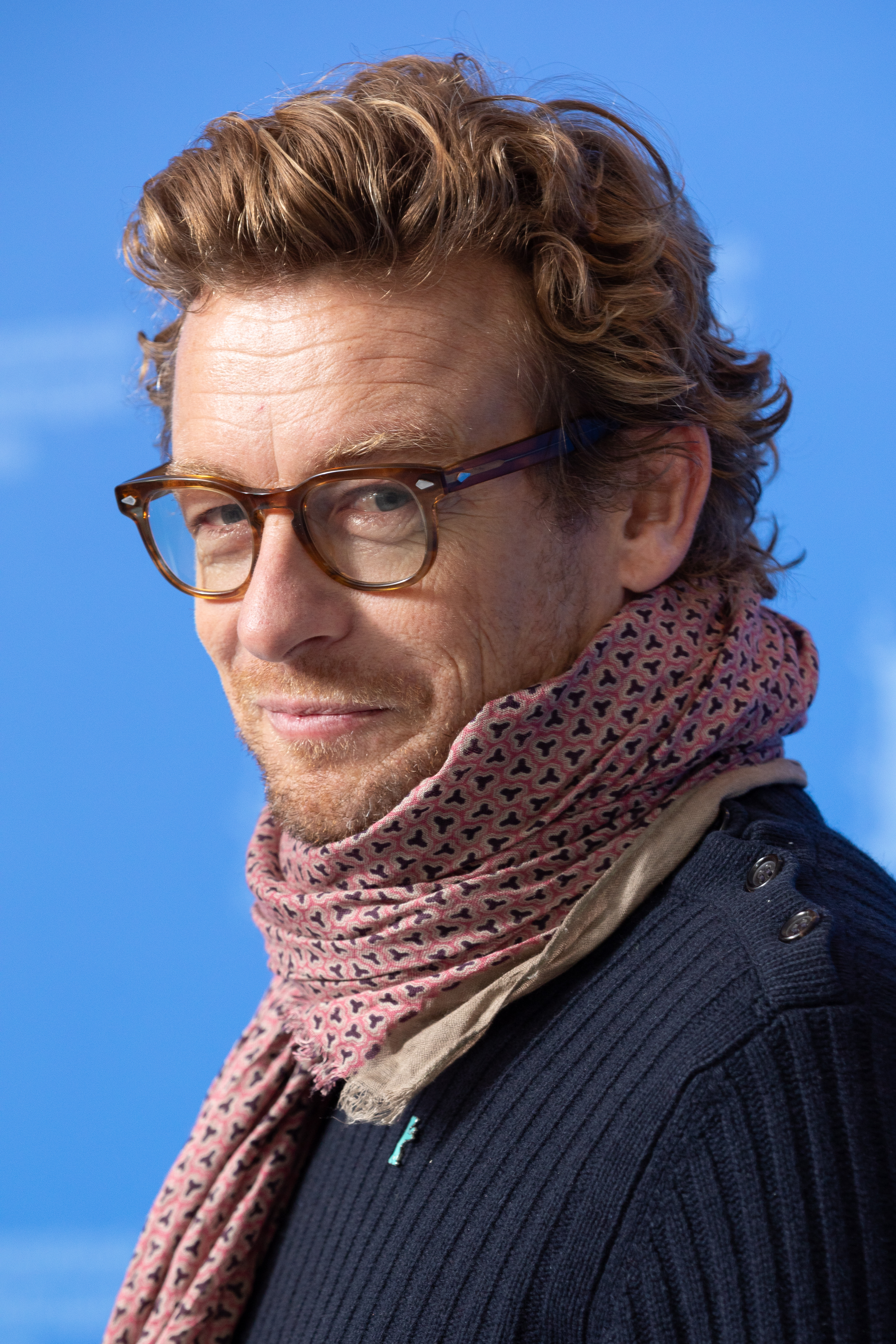
- The 2024 recipient: Simon Baker
- Awarded for: Best supporting actor
- Country: Asia–Pacific region
- Presented by: Asian Academy Creative Awards
- First award: 2018
- Currently held by: Hisyam Hamid, Memori (2025)
- Website: asianacademycreativeawards.com

This is a list of the winners of the Asian Academy Creative Award for Best Actor in a Supporting Role since its institution in 2018. The award is presented to the best supporting actor performance in a television series or film. Apart from the main award, the category is also awarded regionally in seventeen participating nations.

== Winners ==
The following table display the winners of the award.

Year	Actor	Program	Network	Country	Ref.
2018	Michael Kho	Kenapa Harus Bule?	Viu	Indonesia	
2019	Jamie Aditya	Grisse	HBO Asia	Indonesia	
2020	Miller Khan	The Bridge	Viu	Malaysia	
2021	Lee Do-hyun	Sweet Home	Netflix	South Korea	
2022	Wu Kang-ren	Light the Night	Netflix	Taiwan	
2023	Teuku Rifnu Wikana	96 Jam	Vidio	Indonesia	
2024	Simon Baker	Boy Swallows Universe	Netflix	Australia	
2025	Hisyam Hamid	Memori	Creative Stew	Malaysia	

=== Regional winners ===
The following table display the winners of the regional award, sorted by the participating nations.

==== Australia ====
Year	Actor	Program	Network
2019	Wayne Blair	Mystery Road	ABC
2022	Sam Wang	New Gold Mountain	SBS
2024	Simon Baker	Boy Swallows Universe	Netflix
2025	Hugo Weaving	How to Make Gravy	Binge

==== China ====
Year	Actor	Program	Network
2019	Wang Maolei	Story of Yanxi Palace	iQIYI
2021	Liu Guanlin	My Heroic Husband	iQIYI
2026	Zhu Yawen	Swords Into Plowshares	China Huase Film

==== Hong Kong ====
Year	Actor	Program	Network
2019	Oscar Leung	The Defected	TVB
2022	Oscar Leung	Flying Tiger 3	TVB
2023	Lam Tsz-sin	The Invisibles	TVB
2024	Dickson Yu	Tales at the Corner	Viu
2025	Nicholas Yuen	Call of Destiny	TVB
2026	Yeung Lok Man	Before The End	Viu

==== India ====
Year	Actor	Program	Network
2018	Neeraj Kabi	Sacred Games	Netflix
2019	Balaji Manohar	Bhak	HOOQ
2021	Naseeruddin Shah	Bandish Bandits	Amazon Prime Video
2022	Vishal Jethwa	Human	Disney+ Hotstar
2023	Prosenjit Chatterjee	Jubilee	Amazon Prime Video
2024	Vijay Raaz	Chandu Champion	Pen Marudah Entertainment
2025	Ranvir Shorey	Shekhar Home	Jio Hotstar
2026	Jaideep Ahlawat	The Family Man	Amazon Prime Video

==== Indonesia ====
Year	Actor	Program	Network
2018	Michael Kho	Kenapa Harus Bule?	Viu
2019	Jamie Aditya	Grisse	HBO Asia
2020	Baskara Mahendra	Assalamualaikum Calon Imam	Viu
2022	Arbani Yasiz	The Earth of Three Colors	MNC
2023	Teuku Rifnu Wikana	96 Jam	Vidio
2024	Teuku Rifnu Wikana	Amara's First Love	Vidio

==== Japan ====
Year	Actor	Program	Network
2021	Shinnosuke Mitsushima	The Naked Director	Netflix
2024	Go Ayano	Yu Yu Hakasho	Netflix
2026	Go Ayano	Chiruran: Shinsengumi Requiem	Netflix

==== Myanmar ====
Year	Actor	Program	Network
2026	Vita Min	Till The Last Raindrop	CANAL+ MYANMAR

==== Malaysia ====
Year	Actor	Program	Network
2018	Remy Ishak	Do[s]a	Astro
2019	Coby Chong	The Promise	8TV
2020	Miller Khan	The Bridge	Viu
2021	Khir Rahman	Black	Viu
2022	Nadhir Nasar	Nusyuz Berkiblat Cinta	Astro Ria
2023	Syafie Naswip	Nenek Bongkok Tiga	Viu
2024	Mikael Noah	Hermaphrodite: Che Kun Che Nisa	Astro Malaysia
2025	Hisyam Hamid	Memori	Creative Stew
2026	Farihin Arnia	Kelas Belakang	Viu

==== Philippines ====
Year	Actor	Program	Network
2018	Gabby Eigenmann	Contessa	GMA Network
2019	Tirso Cruz III	The General's Daughter	ABS-CBN
2021	Nonie Buencamino	Huwag Kang Mangamba	ABS-CBN
2022	Zaijian Jaranilla	The Broken Marriage Vow	ABS-CBN
2023	Mon Confiado	A Silent Night	Amazon Prime Video
2024	JM de Guzman	Deceit	Amazon Prime Video
2025	Piolo Pascual	The Kingdom	MQuest Distribution
2026	Mon Confiado	Salvageland	Viva Films

==== Singapore ====
Year	Actor	Program	Network
2018	Thaneth Warakulnukroh	Missing	Channel 5
2019	Chen Shucheng	It's Time	Toggle
2020	Fabian Loo	The Driver	meWatch
2021	Gurmit Singh	Slow Dancing	Mediacorp
2022	Aric Hidir	S.P.Y.: Special Police Youth Unit	Mediacorp
2023	Shrey Bhargava	Titoudao: Dawn of a New Stage	Mediacorp
2024	Zhang Zetong	All That Glitters	Mediacorp
2025	Dato Hans Isaac	Korban Part Two	Mediacorp
2026	Fir Rahman	Durrani - Perjuangan Lion Mum	Mediacorp

==== South Korea ====
Year	Actor	Program	Network
2021	Lee Do-hyun	Sweet Home	Netflix
2023	Jo Woo-jin	Narco-Saints	Netflix
2024	Ahn Jae-hong	Mask Girl	Netflix

==== Taiwan ====
Year	Actor	Program	Network
2018	Chia-kuei Chen	Roseki	Hakka TV
2019	Lung Shao-hua	A Taiwanese Tale of Two Cities	Formosa Television
2020	Ko Shu-yuan	The Mirror	Formosa Television
2022	Wu Kang-ren	Light the Night	Netflix
2023	Wu Kun-da	On Our Way	Da Ai Television
2024	Kai Ko	Imperfect Us	Taiwan Public Television Service
2025	Hao Hsiang Hsu	The Bliss	Tzu Chi Culture and Communication Foundation
2026	Shih Chih-tian	Had I Not Seen the Sun	Netflix

==== Thailand ====
Year	Actor	Program	Network
2019	Denkhun Ngamnet	Krong Kam	Channel 3
2020	Nichkhun	My Bubble Tea	Viu
2021	Kan Kantathavorn	Voice in the Rain	Viu
2022	Jumpol Adulkittiporn	Astrophile	GMM 25
2023	Sadanont Durongkavarojana	Get Rich	Viu
2024	Krittanun Aunchananun	The Rebound	Viu
2025	Atthaphan Phunsawat	Leap Day	GMM 25
2026	Perawat Sangpotirat	Wu	GMM 25
