= Asian Academy Creative Awards =

Film and television awards at the Singapore Media Festival

- Awarded for: Excellence in film and television
- Country: Singapore
- Presented by: Asian Academy Creative Awards
- First award: December, 2018
- Final award: December, 2023
- Website: asianacademycreativeawards.com

The annual Asian Academy Creative Awards are presented every December as part of the Singapore Media Festival. They recognise excellence in the film and television industry across 16 nations in the Asia-Pacific region.

== History ==
The inaugural awards were held in December 2018, at the Capitol Theatre, Singapore. The 2019 awards were held in the Victoria Theatre, Singapore. Due to the global COVID-19 outbreak, the 2020 awards were held over two nights in a 'virtual theatre,' where each nation represented held their own ceremony in conjunction with the main event in Singapore.

2021 awards were held in Singapore from December 2 and 3, for nominations announced on October 4, 2021. 38 awards were given to winners of Asian-made TV and streaming content in various categories.

In March 2026, the Asian Academy Creative Awards announced the creation of the Best Micro-Drama (duanju) category. Additional details released ahead of the awards identified French producer Guillaume Sanjorge among the inaugural jury members.

== Award ==
The winner of each category receives the 'Golden Goddess' statue. The statue stands at 36 cm (14 inches) and was designed by Society Awards, New York.

== Award winners ==
=== Grand Final Winners ===
The chart lists Grand Final Award winners of 2018, 2019, 2020, 2021, 2022, 2023, 2024: and 2025:

Best Feature Film	Best Drama Series
2025 – (China) MuMu (CKF Pictures (Ningbo), iQIYI Pictures (Beijing) and Shanghai Tao Piao Piao Movie &TV Culture); 2024 – (Japan) City Hunter (Netflix); 2023 – (Thailand) Hunger (Netflix); 2022 – (Japan) Asakusa Kid (Netflix); 2020 – (Malaysia) The Garden of Evening Mists (HBO Asia); 2019 – (New Zealand) Daffodils (Libertine Pictures); 2018 – (India) Gully Boy (Excel Entertainment and Tiger Baby)	2025 – (China) Strange Tales of Tang Dynasty: To The West (iQIYI and Beijing Changxin Film and Media); 2024 – (Thailand) Doctor Climax (Netflix); 2023 – (South Korea) The Glory (Netflix); 2022 – (South Korea) Twenty-Five Twenty-One (tvN); 2021 – (South Korea) Move to Heaven (Netflix); 2020 – (South Korea) Crash Landing On You (tvN); 2019 – (India) Delhi Crime (Golden Caravan Productions); 2018 – (Japan) Miss Sherlock (Hulu)
Best Documentary	Best Documentary Series
2025 – (Japan) Hiroshima's Tower of Life (NHK); 2024 – (Australia) Hitler's Jewish Soldier? (SBS); 2023 – (Australia) The Cleaning Company (SBS); 2022 – (Australia) Osher Günsberg: A Matter of Life and Death (Lune Media / SBS); 2021 – (Australia) Birdsville or Bust (Mint Pictures / SBS); 2020 – (Australia) The Australian Dream (Passion Pictures); 2019 – The Final Quarter (Network 10 Australia); 2018 – (South Korea) Secret State Inside North Korea (CNN)	2025 – (Pakistan) Addicted – The Synthetic Curse (CNA and Mediacorp); 2024 – (Singapore) Walk the Line (CNA and Mediacorp); 2023 – (Japan) Nature's Hidden Miracles: The Secret Life of Plants (NHK); 2022 – (Singapore) Open Secrets: The Untouchable Chaebols Of South Korea (Vice Media Asia Pacific); 2021 – (Australia) See What You Made Me Do (SBS, Northern Pictures and Blue Ant International); 2020 – (Australia) Revelation (ABC and In Films); 2019 – Extreme China (NGC Network Asia); 2018 – (Singapore) The Talwars: Behind Closed Doors (HBO Asia)
Best Actor in a Leading Role	Best Actress in a Leading Role
2025 – (Philippines) Dennis Trillo for Green Bones (GMA Pictures); 2024 – (Japan) Ryohei Suzuki for City Hunter (Netflix); 2023 – (India) Vijay Varma for Dahaad (Amazon Prime Video); 2022 – (South Korea) Jung Hae-in for D.P. (Netflix); 2021 – (South Korea) Lee Je-hoon for Move to Heaven (Netflix); 2020 – (Philippines) Arjo Atayde for Bagman (ABS-CBN); 2019 – (Indonesia) Oka Antara for Brata (HOOQ and Telkomsel); 2018 – (China) Yu Hewei for The Drug Hunter (Culture Media Co. Ltd)	2025 – (Japan) Yuriyan Retriever for The Queen of Villains (Netflix); 2024 – (Malaysia) Susan Lankester for Rain Town (Current Pictures); 2023 – (India) Rajshri Deshpande for Trial by Fire (Netflix); 2022 – (Philippines) Jodi Sta. Maria for The Broken Marriage Vow (ABS-CBN); 2021 – (India) Konkona Sen Sharma for Ajeeb Daastaans (Netflix); 2020 – (Malaysia) Yeo Yann Yann for Invisible Stories (HBO / Warner Media); 2019 – (India) Shefali Shah for Delhi Crime (Golden Caravan Productions); 2018 – (Indonesia) Adinia Wirasti for Critical Eleven (HOOQ)
Best Actor in a Supporting Role	Best Actress in a Supporting Role
2025 – (Malaysia) Hisyam Hamid for Memori (Creative Stew); 2024 – (Australia) Simon Baker for Boy Swallows Universe (Netflix); 2023 – (Indonesia) Teuku Rifnu Wikana for 96 Jam (Vidio); 2022 – (Taiwan) Wu Kang-ren for Light the Night (Netflix); 2021 – (South Korea) Lee Do-hyun for Sweet Home (Netflix); 2020 – (Malaysia) Miller Khan for The Bridge (Viu / Double Vision); 2019 – (Indonesia) Jamie Aditya for Grisse (HBO Pacific Partners); 2018 – (Indonesia) Michael Kho for Kenapa Harus Bule? (Viu)	2025 – (Singapore) Ivory Chia for Emerald Hill - The Little Nyonya Story (Mediacorp); 2024 – (South Korea) Yeom Hye-ran for Mask Girl (Netflix); 2023 – (South Korea) Lim Ji-yeon for The Glory (Netflix); 2022 – (Taiwan) Liou Yiin-shang for Still Me (Tzu Chi Culture And Communication Foundation); 2021 – (India) Amruta Subhash for Bombay Begums (Netflix); 2020 – (Singapore) Lina Ng for Last Madame (Mediacorp); 2019 – (Myanmar) Pyae Pyae for The Only Mom (Brave Empire Entertainment); 2018 – (Taiwan) Candy Yang for Roseki (Hakka TV)
Best Single Drama	Best Current Affairs Program or Series
2025 – (Taiwan) Granny Must Die (Hakka TV); 2024 – (Japan) Deaf Voice: A Sign-Language Interpreter in Court (NHK); 2023 – (India) Modern Love Chennai (Amazon Prime Video); 2022 – (India) Qatil Haseenaon Ke Naam (ZEE5); 2021 – (Taiwan) Kill for Love (Studio76 Original Productions); 2020 – (Taiwan) 76 Horror Bookstore (Studio76); 2019 – (Japan) An Artist of the Floating World (NHK); 2018 – (Philippines) Maalaala Mo Kaya (ABS-CBN)	2024 – (Taiwan) Broken News (TaiwanPlus); 2023 – Women on the Front Line: 15% of Japan's Politicians (NHK); 2022 – Ganga River From The Skies (National Geographic India); 2021 – PD Note Our Twisted Heroes (South Korea) Munhwa Broadcasting Corporation; 2020 – Man Woman and #MeToo (Discovery Channel India); 2019 – (Singapore) Undercover Asia (Channel NewsAsia, Mediacorp); 2018 – India: The Last Drop (National Geographic)
Best Direction (Fiction)	Best Direction (Non-Fiction)
2025 – (Japan) Kazuya Shiraishi for The Queen of Villains (Netflix); 2024 – (South Korea) Jang Young-woo & Kim Hee-won for Queen of Tears (Netflix); 2023 – (Japan) Itaru Mizuno for Rebooting (Nippon TV); 2022 – (India) Basil Joseph for Minnal Murali (Weekend Blockbusters / Netflix); 2021 – (South Korea) Lee Eung-bok for Sweet Home (Netflix); 2020 – (Japan) Takumi Saitoh for Food Lore: Life In A Box (HBO / WarnerMedia); 2019 – (India) Richie Mehta for Delhi Crime (Golden Caravan Productions); 2018 – (India) Anurag Kashyap for Sacred Games (Netflix)	2025 – (Singapore) Rowena Loh for Karikal Mahal: A Silent Witness (Ochre Pictures, Mediacorp, CNA); 2024 – (India) Selvamani Selvaraj for The Hunt for Veerappan (Netflix); 2023 – Chin-Yuan Ke for Sea Spray (Taiwan Public Television Service Foundation); 2022 – (Singapore) Ziqing/Eve for Inside Maximum Security – Road To Freedom (CNA / Mediacorp); 2021 – Robbie Bridgman & Steve Chao for Traffickers: Inside The Golden Triangle (Thailand) (HBO / WarnerMedia / IFA Media); 2020 – Sujata Kulshreshtha for India 2050 (Discovery Channel India); 2019 – Jatuporn Athasopa for Extreme China (NGC Network Asia); 2018 – (Singapore) Douglas Lan for National Service (Mediacorp and Channel News Asia)
Best Adaptation of an Existing Format	Best Non-Scripted Entertainment
2025; Non-Scripted: (India) The Traitors S1 (Prime Video and All3Media International); Scripted: (Philippines) Saving Grace (ABS-CBN); 2024; Non-Scripted: The Traitors New Zealand Series 1 (South Pacific Pictures); Scripted: (Thailand) The Betrayal (Juve9 and Channel 3); 2023 – (Singapore) Old Enough #1 (OTRD) (CNA / Mediacorp); 2022 – Star Vs Food (Malaysia) (Astro); 2021 – The Apprentice: ONE Championship Edition (Singapore) Refinery Media; 2020 – (Indonesia) Pretty Little Liars (Viu and Cinema Collective); 2019 – (South Korea) Designated Survivor: 60 Days (Netflix); 2018 – (South Korea) Life On Mars (Studio Dragon)	2025 – (Australia) Muster Dogs Series 3 (Ambience Entertainment and ABC); 2024 – (Australia) Gordon Ramsay's Future Food Stars (All3Media International and Studio Ramsay); 2023 – (South Korea) Physical: 100 (Netflix); 2022 – Eurovision – Australia Decides – Gold Coast 2022 (SBS); 2021 – The Apprentice: ONE Championship Edition (Singapore) Refinery Media; 2020 – Man vs Wild with Bear Grylls (Discovery Channel India); 2019 – (China) World's Got Talent (Hunan TV); 2018 – (India) The Remix (Amazon Prime)
Best Children's Program	Best Preschool Program
2025 – (South Korea) Super Guardians: Polar Rescue (ACOMMZ); 2024 – (Japan) I Love ’Mee’: That Felt Kinda Weird? (NHK); 2023 – (Singapore) Mr. Midnight: Beware The Monsters (Beach House Pictures / Netflix); 2022 – (Taiwan) Hello, My Name Is Dong-Ping (Hakka TV); 2021 – Mystic (New Zealand) Libertine Pictures and Slim Film + TV; 2020 – (India) Lamput – "The Chase" (Cartoon Network and WarnerMedia); 2019 – (New Zealand) The Cul De Sac (Greenstone TV); 2018 – (Singapore) Oddbods (One Animation)	2022 – (Australia) Bluey (Ludo Studio/ABC Kids); 2021 – Shimajiro: A World of WOW! Our Oceans (Japan) Benesse Corporation/ TV Setouchi; 2020 – (Australia) Bluey (Ludo Studio/ABC Kids); 2019 – (Australia) Hiccup & Sneeze (Northern Pictures and Beach House Pictures); 2018 – (Philippines) Tilda Appleseed (August Media)

== Categories ==
=== Major categories ===
- Best Feature Film
- Best Drama Series
- Best Documentary Programme (one-off)
- Best Documentary Series
- Best Actor in a Leading Role
- Best Actress in a Leading Role
- Best Actor in a Supporting Role
- Best Actress in a Supporting Role
- Best Single Drama/Telemovie/Anthology Episode

=== Television ===
- Best Current Affairs Programme or Series
- Best Branded Programme or Series
- Best Children's Programme (One-off / Series)
- Best General Entertainment, Game or Quiz Programme
- Best Infotainment Programme
- Best Lifestyle, Entertainment Presenter/Host
- Best Lifestyle Programme

=== News ===
- Best News or Current Affairs Presenter/Anchor
- Best News Programme
- Best Single News Story/Report

=== Comedy ===
- Best Actor/Actress in a Comedy Role
- Best Comedy Programme

=== Technical ===
- Best Direction (Fiction)
- Best Direction (Non-Fiction)
- Best Cinematography
- Best Editing
- Best Sound
- Best Animated Programme or Series (2D or 3D)

=== All media ===
- Best Non Scripted Entertainment
- Best Original Screenplay
- Best Original Programme by a Streamer/OTT
- Best Preschool Programme
- Best Promo or Trailer
- Best Short Form Content
- Best Natural History or Wildlife Programme
- Best Theme Song (or Title Theme)
- Best Visual or Special FX (TV or Feature Film)
- Best Voice Artist
- Best Adaptation of an Existing Format

== List of Countries by Number of Wins at Grand Final ==
=== Participating nations/regions ===
The Asian Academy Creative Awards celebrate works from Australia, New Zealand, Bangladesh, Cambodia, mainland China, Hong Kong, India, Indonesia, Japan, Malaysia, Myanmar, Philippines, Singapore, South Korea, Taiwan, Thailand and Vietnam.

	2018	2019	2020	2021	2022	2023	2024	2025	Total
Australia	5	4	4	3	6	1	4	2	29
Bangladesh	0	0	0	0	0	0	0	0	0
Cambodia	0	0	0	0	0	0	0	0	0
China	3	4	1	3	0	1	4	4	20
Hong Kong	5	1	0	2	1	1	1	4	15
India	8	6	7	7	7	7	4	5	51
Indonesia	4	2	1	0	1	1	0	0	9
Japan	1	2	4	4	4	7	11	6	39
Malaysia	2	3	3	2	2	2	2	2	18
Myanmar	0	2	1	0	0	1	0	0	4
New Zealand	1	2	0	1	1	0	3	0	8
Philippines	2	2	1	2	1	2	0	2	12
Singapore	9	5	9	6	8	7	4	6	54
South Korea	3	2	4	5	5	3	3	5	30
Taiwan	2	3	3	2	3	1	2	3	19
Thailand	2	1	2	1	1	2	4	1	14
Vietnam	0	1	0	0	0	0	0	0	1

== Patrons ==
- Warner Media – Foundation Patron
- Facebook – Patron
- ABS-CBN Entertainment – Patron

== See also ==
- Lists of film awards
