= Asian Academy Creative Award for Best Actor/Actress in a Comedy Role =

Award for outstanding performance in a comedy role

- Awarded for: Best performance in a comedy role
- Country: Asia–Pacific region
- Presented by: Asian Academy Creative Awards
- First award: 2018
- Currently held by: Azira Shafinaz, Ijab Kabut (2023)
- Website: asianacademycreativeawards.com

This is a list of the winners of the Asian Academy Creative Award for Best Actor/Actress in a Comedy Role since its institution in 2018. The category was named Best Comedy Performance from 2018 to 2022. Apart from the main award, the category is also awarded regionally in seventeen participating nations.

== Winners ==
The following table display the winners of the award.

Year	Actor	Program	Network	Country	Ref.
2018	Jeremy Chan	My Agent Is a Hero	Toggle	Singapore	
2019	Jihan Musa	Keluarga Baha Don	Viu	Malaysia	
2020	Hirzi Zulkiflie	Comedy Central Stand Up, Asia!	Comedy Central Asia	Singapore	
2021	Susan Lankester	Keluarga Baha Don	Viu	Malaysia	
2022	Mark Lee	It's All Your Fault!	—N/a	Singapore	
2023	Azira Shafinaz	Ijab Kabut	Viu	Malaysia	

=== Regional winners ===
The following table display the winners of the regional award, sorted by the participating nations.

==== Hong Kong ====
Year	Actor	Program	Network
2019	Ali Lee	Who Wants A Baby?	TVB
2022	Karl Ting	Freedom Memories	TVB
2023	Jeannie Ng Ka-yan	#lovesignal	Viu

==== India ====
Year	Actor	Program	Network
2019	Zakir Khan	Kaksha Gyarvi	Amazon Prime Video
2020	Rohan Joshi	Wake N Bake	Amazon Prime Video
2021	Jaaved Jaaferi	Animals Gone Wild with Jaaved Jaaferi	National Geographic
2022	Jitendra Kumar	Panchayat	Amazon Prime Video
2023	Ratna Pathak Shah	Happy Family: Conditions Apply	Amazon Prime Video

==== Indonesia ====
Year	Actor	Program	Network
2021	Claudy Putri	Star Stealer	Viu

==== Malaysia ====
Year	Actor	Program	Network
2018	Estee Tan	Hua Hee Seko-Lah	Astro Hua Hee Dai
2019	Jihan Musa	Keluarga Baha Don	Viu
2020	Melissa Campbell	Kopitiam: Double Shot	Viu
2021	Susan Lankester	Keluarga Baha Don	Viu
2022	Diana Danielle	She Was Pretty	Viu
2023	Azira Shafinaz	Ijab Kabut	Viu

==== Philippines ====
Year	Actor	Program	Network
2018	Michael V.	Pepito Manaloto	GMA Network
2019	Michael V.	Pepito Manaloto	GMA Network
2022	Pepe Herrera	My Papa Pi	ABS-CBN
2023	Isabelle Daza	K-LOVE	Viu

==== Singapore ====
Year	Actor	Program	Network
2018	Jeremy Chan	My Agent Is a Hero	Toggle
2019	Udaya Soundari	Adukku Veetu Annasamy	Vasantham
2020	Hirzi Zulkiflie	Comedy Central Stand Up, Asia!	Comedy Central Asia
2021	Allan Wu	Crouching Tiger Hidden Ghost	Channel 8
2022	Mark Lee	It's All Your Fault!	—N/a
2023	Yuvaraj Krishnasamy	Kaki Bola	Mediacorp

==== Taiwan ====
Year	Actor	Program	Network
2019	Jeremy Liu	My Goddess	iQIYI
2020	Judy Chou	Moonlight Romance	iQIYI
2021	Allison Lin	Adventure of the Ring	HBO Asia

==== Thailand ====
Year	Actor	Program	Network
2018	Mario Maurer	Saranae Love You	HOOQ
2019	Mario Maurer	Thong Ek: The Herbal Master	Channel 3
2021	Nadech Kugimiya	To Me, It's Simply You	Channel 3
2022	Niti Chaichitathorn	Talk with Toey	GMMTV

==== Vietnam ====
Year	Actor	Program	Network
2023	Nhan Phúc Vinh	Odd Family	K+
