= FHR =

FHR may refer to:

== Places ==
- Foothill Ranch, Lake Forest, California, United States
- Friday Harbor Airport in Washington, United States

== Other uses ==
- Flint Hills Resources, a petroleum refining company owned by Koch Industries Inc.
- Formosa Hakka Radio, a radio station in Taiwan
- Fetal heart rate
- Fluoride high-temperature reactor
- Ice Hockey Federation of Russia
