= Kupu-Kupu Kertas =

2023 film by Emil Heradi

- Directed by: Emil Heradi
- Produced by: Denny Siregar and Yoen K.
- Starring: Amanda Manopo; Chicco Kurniawan; Iwa K.; Reza Oktovian; Samo Rafael
- Cinematography: Padri Nadeak
- Edited by: Wawan I. Wibowo
- Music by: Andi Rianto
- Production companies: Denny Siregar Production; Maxima Pictures
- Release date: 7 February 2024
- Running time: 113 minutes
- Country: Indonesia
- Language: Indonesian

Kupu-Kupu Kertas (English: Paper Butterfly) is a 2024 Indonesian drama film wrapped in history that premiered in Indonesian cinemas on February 7, 2024. The film was withdrawn from circulation on February 10, 2024, then the film was re-screened on September 26, 2024.

== Synopsis ==
This film tells the story of the situation in Indonesia in the 1960s, when the love of a girl named Ning, who grew up in a family of Indonesian Communist Party (PKI). She fell in love with Ihsan, a man from a Nahdlatul Ulama (NU) family. They were hindered because of ideological differences. At first, they did not care about the differences in background. However, the situation changed drastically when a major conflict occurred. Until one night, Rasjid, Ihsan's older brother, along with dozens of other Ansor members, were attacked and killed by PKI sympathizers led by Ning's father, Rekoso, and his right-hand man, Busok. This violence sparked deep hatred in society, making the situation increasingly uncontrollable. Realizing the danger that threatened their lives, Ihsan tried to take Ning to escape from the rage of the masses who were thirsty for revenge. This film presents a steep journey of love in the midst of ideological conflict. The film will feature dramatic tension that reflects the Indonesia's socio-political conditions in 1965.

== Cast ==
- Amanda Manopo as Ning
- Chicco Kurniawan as Ihsan
- Iwa K. as Rekoso
- Reza Oktovian as Busok
- Samo Rafael as Rasyid
- Fajar Nugra as Zul
- Ayu Laksmi as Sulastri
- Seroja Hafiedz as Aida
