= Cinta Yasmin =

Indonesian drama television series

- Genre: Melodrama; Romance; Revenge
- Screenplay by: Chelvia Chaidir; Sadia Senjana; Rebecca Bath
- Directed by: Doddy Djanas
- Starring: Amanda Manopo; Kenny Austin; Samuel Zylgwyn; Lea Ciarachel; Irsyadillah; Salshabilla Adriani; Aida Agustina; Xavier Nainggolan; Faby Marcelia; Frans Mohede; Naufal Samudra; Yogi Tama; Linda Ramadhanty; Adi Irwandi; Daniel Leo; Fatmasury Dahlan; Yuzar Nazaros; Fredy Amin
- Theme music composer: Dadang S. Manaf; Melly Goeslaw
- Opening theme: "Bertemu Kembali" by Melly Goeslaw, Nike Ardilla
- Ending theme: "Bertemu Kembali" by Melly Goeslaw, Nike Ardilla
- Composer: Joseph S. Djafar
- Country of origin: Indonesia
- Original language: Indonesian
- No. of seasons: 1
- No. of episodes: 272

Production
- Executive producers: Filriady Kusmara; Rista Ferina; M. Abul Latis; Andre Forester
- Producers: Devid; Hesti Yudiarti; M. Abul Latis; M. Aminullah; Aminullah Latif; Andes Herjadi
- Cinematography: Denny Gompal
- Editors: Muhamad Rizal; Mr. Muchlis; Abah Dadang; Sujana Teja; Roby Sunjaya; Suyud Yusup; Widodo Prihantoro
- Camera setup: Multi-camera
- Running time: 75 minutes
- Production company: MNC Pictures

Original release
- Network: RCTI
- Release: 5 August 2024 – 13 April 2025

Cinta Yasmin is an Indonesian television series produced by MNC Pictures which aired from 5 August 2024 to 14 April 2025 on RCTI. It stars Amanda Manopo, Kenny Austin, and Samuel Zylgwyn.

== Plot ==
Yasmin is a hardworking woman. She aspires to be a successful career woman. However, it's not easy; she faces many obstacles in pursuing her dreams.

During her journey, she meets two men, Rangga and Romeo. Despite their different backgrounds, both share one desire: Yasmin's love.

Both men compete for Yasmin's heart. Despite this, Yasmin remains undaunted in pursuing her desire for success. Her desire for success is expressed in every word of encouragement.

== Cast ==
=== Main ===
- Amanda Manopo as Yasmin Adriana
- Kenny Austin as Romeo Algibran
- Samuel Zylgwyn as Rangga Cakradinata

=== Recurring ===
- Lea Ciarachel as Alisya Cakradinata
- Irsyadillah as Dion Adhitama
- Moudy Wilhelmina as Ajeng Cakradinata
- Xavier Nainggolan as Romeo Algibran
- Rama Michael as Galang Ardiansyah
- Aida Agustina as Diah
- Denny Weller as Dirgantara Mahesa
- Salshabilla Adriani as Dania Aurelia Darmawan
- Faby Marcelia as Nina Amelia
- Frans Mohede as Baskara Cakradinata
- Naufal Samudra as Nathan Alendra
- Yogi Tama as Prasetyo Kurniawan
- Linda Ramadhanty as Ratih Aprilia
- Adi Irwandi as Heru Indrawan
- Arsyla Shakila as Kayla Cakradinata
- Daniel Leo as Yoga Jatmiko
- Vinnez Demaya as Ririn
- Anokidomi Hardadi as Alfie
- Fatmasury Dahlan as Sandra Anjani
- Indira Kaneez as Yasmin kecil
- Yuzar Nazaros as Jordan
- Galang Gym as Desta Purwanto
- Fredy Amin as Bagus Sutejo

== Production ==
=== Casting ===
Amanda Manopo was reportedly cast as Yasmin. Kenny Austin was confirmed to play Romeo. Samuel Zylgwyn was roped for the role of Rangga.

== Awards and nominations ==
Year	Award	Category	Recipient	Result	Ref.
2025	Indonesian Drama Series Awards	Favorite Female Lead in a Drama Series	Amanda Manopo	Nominated	
2025	Indonesian Drama Series Awards	Antagonist in Favorite Drama Series	Moudy Wilhelmina	Nominated	
2025	Indonesian Drama Series Awards	Favorite Couples in Drama Series (Yasmin — Romeo)	Amanda Manopo & Kenny Austin	Nominated	
2025	Indonesian Drama Series Awards	Favorite Drama Series Writer	Sadia Senjana & Rebecca Bath	Nominated	
2025	Indonesian Drama Series Awards	Favorite Drama Series Director	Doddy Djanas	Nominated	
2025	Indonesian Drama Series Awards	Favorite Drama Series Soundtracks	"Bertemu Kembali" oleh Melly Goeslaw & Nike Ardilla	Nominated	
2025	Indonesian Television Awards	Most Popular Primetime Drama Programs	Cinta Yasmin	Nominated	
2025	Indonesian Television Awards	Best Actor - Popular	Samuel Zylgwyn	Nominated	
2025	Indonesian Television Awards	Best Actress - Popular	Amanda Manopo	Nominated	
2025	Indonesian Television Awards	Best Television Actress - Popular	Amanda Manopo	Nominated	
