= Asian Academy Creative Award for Best Comedy Programme =

Award for outstanding television comedy programme

- Awarded for: Best comedy programme
- Country: Asia–Pacific region
- Presented by: Asian Academy Creative Awards
- First award: 2018
- Currently held by: Unchained Melody (2023)
- Website: asianacademycreativeawards.com

This is a list of the winners of the Asian Academy Creative Award for Best Comedy Programme since its institution in 2018. Apart from the main award, the category is also awarded regionally in seventeen participating nations.

== Winners ==
The following table display the winners of the award.

Year	Program	Network	Country	Ref.
2018	Queens of Comedy	TLC	India	
2019	Keluarga Baha Don	Viu	Malaysia	
2020	Mr. Zoo: The Missing VIP	—N/a	South Korea	
2021	My Heroic Husband	iQIYI	China	
2022	Kid Sister	Greenstone TV	New Zealand	
2023	Unchained Melody	TVB	Hong Kong	

=== Regional winners ===
The following table display the winners of the regional award, sorted by the participating nations.

==== Australia ====
Year	Program	Network
2019	Kinne Tonight	Network 10
2023	Queen of Oz	ABC TV

==== China ====
Year	Program	Network
2018	Saturday Night Live China	Youku
2021	My Heroic Husband	iQIYI
2022	Small and Mighty	Bilibili
2023	Super Sketch Show	iQIYI

==== Hong Kong ====
Year	Program	Network
2019	Who Wants a Baby?	TVB
2022	Freedom Memories	TVB
2023	Unchained Melody	TVB

==== India ====
Year	Program	Network
2018	Queens of Comedy	TLC
2019	Sketchy Behaviour	Amazon Prime Video
2020	The Week That Wasn't	CNN-News18
2021	The Week That Wasn't	CNN-News18
2022	Panchayat	Amazon Prime Video

==== Indonesia ====
Year	Program	Network
2018	Aliansi	HOOQ
2019	Siap Gan!	—N/a
2020	Imperfect	Netflix
2021	Star Stealer	Viu

==== Japan ====
Year	Program	Network
2021	Shoga Drama: Tokugawa Ieyasu	Kansai Telecasting Corporation
2022	Hey Handsome!!	Tokai TV

==== Malaysia ====
Year	Program	Network
2018	Hua Hee Seko-Lah	Astro Hua Hee Dai
2019	Keluarga Baha Don	Viu
2020	Kopitiam: Double Shot	Viu
2021	Isteri Misteri	Viu
2022	Dukun Diva	Astro Shaw
2023	Debunk	—N/a

==== Myanmar ====
Year	Program	Network
2023	An Ugly & Seven Handsomes	Canal+

==== New Zealand ====
Year	Program	Network
2022	Kid Sister	Greenstone TV

==== Philippines ====
Year	Program	Network
2018	Pepito Manaloto	GMA Network
2019	Pepito Manaloto	GMA Network
2021	Boyfriend No. 13	WeTV
2022	BETCIN	WeTV, iflix
2023	K-Love	Viu

==== Singapore ====
Year	Program	Network
2018	The Noose	Channel 5
2019	14 – Celebration of Love	Vasantham
2020	She's a Terrorist and I Love Her	HOOQ
2021	Crouching Tiger Hidden Ghost	Channel 8
2022	Genie In a Cup	Mediacorp
2023	Oppa, Saranghae!	Mediacorp

==== South Korea ====
Year	Program	Network
2019	Mr. Zoo: The Missing VIP	—N/a

==== Taiwan ====
Year	Program	Network
2019	Befriend	iQIYI
2023	The Jennie Show	TaiwanPlus

==== Thailand ====
Year	Program	Network
2018	Saranae Love You	HOOQ
2019	4 Freaks 4 Fam	Viu
2020	Sucker Kick	Line TV
2021	My Mischievous Fiancée	Channel 3
2022	Toey Tiew Thai	GMMTV
2023	School of Gags	Workpoint TV
