= The Great Myanmar =

Burmese Film

- Film poster
- Burmese: ကြီးမြတ်သောမြန်မာ
- Directed by: Jae Sung Jeony; Aung Kyaw Moe
- Screenplay by: Phyo Thinzar Kyaw
- Produced by: Aung Kyaw Moe
- Starring: Ye Aung; Nine Nine; Htike San Moss; Warso Moe Oo
- Music by: Tha O
- Production companies: Forever Group; Niyyayana Production; EBS
- Distributed by: Forever Group
- Release date: August 15, 2019
- Running time: 110 minutes
- Country: Myanmar
- Language: Burmese

The Great Myanmar (Burmese: ကြီးမြတ်သောမြန်မာ), is a 2019 Burmese docu-fiction film starring Ye Aung, Nine Nine, Htike San Moss, Warso Moe Oo. In this film showed about the legends of Myanmar and the first 3D film in Myanmar. The film, produced by Niyyayana Production, premiered in Myanmar on August 15, 2019.

== Cast ==
- Htike San Moss as Shin Arahan
- Ye Aung as Anawrahta
- Nine Nine as Kyansittha
- Warso Moe Oo as Manisanda
- Myat Thu Thu
- Ju Jue Kay
