= Nine Nine =

Burmese actor

- နိုင်းနိုင်း
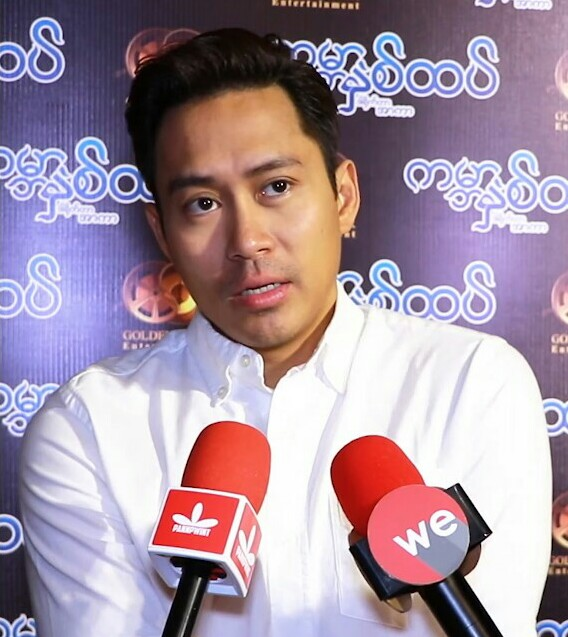
- Nine Nine in 2019
- Born: Tin Zaw Latt; 2 December 1978 (age 47); Yangon, Myanmar
- Education: Yangon University
- Occupation: Actor
- Years active: 1996–present
- Spouse: Sandi Cho (m. 2008)
- Children: 4

Nine Nine (Burmese: နိုင်းနိုင်း; born Tin Zaw Latt on 2 December 1978) is a Burmese actor. He is best known for his leading roles in several Burmese films. Throughout his career, he has acted as leading actor in over 200 films.

== Early life and education ==
Nine Nine was born on 2 December 1978 in Yangon, Myanmar. He graduated from Yangon University.

== Career ==
Nine Nine entered the modeling world under the name Tin Zaw Latt in 1996 and began his acting career in 1997 under the name Nine Nine from Snow White Film Production. He became known to fans through his TV commercials, magazine covers, journals, newspaper covers and music videos. Then he starred in many film with various actress.

== Filmography ==
=== Film ===
- Dar Bae Naw (2003)
- Myaw Lint Chin Myar Swar (2006) – Sit Naing
- The Moon Lotus (2011) – Aung Naing Thu
- မဟာဆန်တဲ့မျက်နှာဖုံး (2015) – Steel
- Kunlong Rak 40 (ကွမ်းလုံရက်၄၀; 2017)
- The Mystery of Burma: Beyond the Dote-hta-waddy (2018) – Htet Paing
- Toxic Man (2018) – Zaw Htike
- Someone (2018)
- The Only Mom (2019) – Aung Thura
- The Great Myanmar (2019) – Kyansittha
- Two Worlds (2019) – Kyaw Htet
- Price Of Love ( 2026 ) - U Nay Thu Kha

== Personal life ==
Nine Nine married Sandi Cho on 12 January 2008 at the Sedona Hotel. They have three daughters and one son.
