= Toxic Man =

2018 Burmese film

- Film Poster
- Burmese: အဆိပ်ရှိလူရိုင်း
- Directed by: Steel (Dwe Myittar)
- Screenplay by: Maung Myat Swe
- Starring: Nine Nine; Khar Ra; Tun Ko Ko; Shwe Thamee
- Cinematography: Manohar
- Edited by: Naing Swe
- Production company: Golden Hour Film Production
- Release date: November 30, 2018
- Running time: 120 minutes
- Country: Myanmar
- Language: Burmese

Toxic Man (Burmese: အဆိပ်ရှိလူရိုင်း) is a 2018 Burmese action-thriller film, directed by Steel (Dwe Myittar) starring Nine Nine, Khar Ra, Tun Ko Ko and Shwe Thamee. The film, produced by Golden Hour Film Production premiered in Myanmar on November 30, 2018.

== Cast ==
- Nine Nine as Zaw Htike
- Khar Ra as Aung Myat
- Tun Ko Ko as Police Officer
- Shwe Thamee as Tharaphi
