= Two Worlds (2019 film) =

Burmese Film

- Film poster
- Burmese: ကမ္ဘာနှစ်ထပ်
- Directed by: Arkar
- Written by: Akyi Taw
- Starring: Nine Nine; May Kabyar; May Myint Mo; Pyae Pyae
- Cinematography: Jason Chen
- Edited by: Chan Nyein Aung
- Production company: Golden Hour Film Production
- Release date: October 10, 2019
- Running time: 105 minutes
- Country: Myanmar
- Language: Burmese

Two Worlds (Burmese: ကမ္ဘာနှစ်ထပ်, romanized: Kambhar Nhaithtaut), is a 2019 Burmese family drama film starring Nine Nine, May Kabyar, May Myint Mo and Pyae Pyae. The film, produced by Golden Hour Film Production, premiered in Myanmar on October 10, 2019.

== Synopsis ==
In a broken family, father Kyaw Htet; Mother Eaindray and her daughter, who hates their father, live separately. On her grandmother's birthday, which is celebrated every year, Eaindray asked her husband to send their daughter Thu Thu because she was too busy with her work. What would happen to a poor father and his daughter on their way to a birthday party?

== Cast ==
- Nine Nine as Kyaw Htet
- May Kabyar as Eaindray
- May Myint Mo as Thiri
- Pyae Pyae as Thu Thu
