= Pyae Pyae =

Burmese actress (born 2009)

- ပြည့်ပြည့်
- Born: Pyae Phoo Myint; August 1, 2009 (age 16); Yangon, Myanmar
- Occupation: Actress
- Parent(s): Pyae Phyo Kyaw (father); Aye Nwe Nwe Thein (mother)
- Awards: Best Actress In Supporting Role (Asian Academy Creative Award 2019)

Pyae Pyae (Burmese: ပြည့်ပြည့်; born 1 August 2009) is a Burmese actress. She won the Asian Academy Creative Award for Best Actress in a Supporting Role in 2019 with the film The Only Mom. Throughout her career, she has acted in over 20 films and 10 big-screen films as a child actor.

== Awards and nominations ==
Year	Award	Category	Nominated work	Result
2016	Second Myanmar Youth MicroFilm	Best Acting Award	A letter to Mom	Won
2017	Seventh Wathann Film Festival	Best Acting Award	OK, I'm fine	Won
2019	Asian Academy Creative Award	Best Supporting Actress	The Only Mom	Won

== Selected filmography ==
=== Film (cinema) ===
- Two Worlds (ကမ္ဘာနှစ်ထပ်) (2019)
- The Only Mom (လိပ်ပြာစံအိမ်) (2019)
- Hit Tine (ဟစ်တိုင်) (2019)
- Kyauk Kyauk Kyauk 2 (ကြောက်ကြောက်ကြောက် ၂) (2019)

=== Short films ===
- A letter to Mom (2016)
- OK, I'm fine (2017)
