= Ikatan Cinta =

Indonesian drama television series

- Genre: Melodrama; Revenge; Romance; Suspense; Family
- Created by: MNC Pictures
- Screenplay by: Theresia Fransisca (Eps. 1—238); Donna Rosamayna (Eps. 239—619)
- Directed by: Doddy Djanas
- Starring: Amanda Manopo; Arya Saloka; Evan Sanders; Glenca Chysara; Reuben Elishama; Rionaldo Stockhorst; Masayu Anastasia; Verrell Bramasta; Yadi Timo; Aryani Fitriana; Verdi Solaiman
- Theme music composer: Ade Govinda feat. Fadly
- Opening theme: Tanpa Batas Waktu by Ade Govinda feat. Fadly
- Ending theme: Tanpa Batas Waktu by Ade Govinda feat. Fadly
- Composer: Joseph S. Djafar
- Country of origin: Indonesia
- Original language: Indonesian
- No. of seasons: 1
- No. of episodes: 1372

Production
- Executive producers: Filriady Kusmara; Rista Ferina; Andre Forester
- Producers: M. Abul Laits; Reno Marciano; Iwan S Manan (Eps. 1—616)
- Cinematography: Kokoq Priatmoko

Original release
- Network: RCTI
- Release: 19 October 2020 – 24 January 2024

Ikatan Cinta (English: The Tie of Love) is an Indonesian television series which premiered 19 October 2020 to 24 January 2024 on RCTI. It starred Amanda Manopo, Arya Saloka, Evan Sanders, and Glenca Chysara. This series is the seventh longest series in Indonesia based on episodes.

This series is the highest rated series of all time in Indonesia and got TRP of 15,7 and an audience share of 53% (The disclosure of Roy's death).

== Plot ==
Ikatan Cinta narrates the tale of two siblings, Andin and Elsa, who were secretly in love with Nino. After Elsa learns that Nino was marrying Andin, their already strained relationship takes a turn for the worse. She opposes her sister's engagement to Nino. With the help of Andin's father, Surya, Andin carries out her desire to wed Nino. Despite the opposition of Elsa and Sarah, her mother.

Andin then learns that Nino and Elsa were once lovers. Elsa was her mother's favorite child, and because of this, anything she desires will be granted. Elsa exploited the circumstance. Many of Elsa's cunning plans are set in motion. The bond between Nino and Andin is unaffected by this though. They both eventually marry.

Elsa accuses Andin of murdering Roy while carrying Roy's child. Andin was imprisoned even though Elsa was the one who killed Roy and was truly expecting his child. Elsa also uses this stipulation to win back Nino's affection. Elsa weds Nino at last.

Nindi, Andin's child with Nino, was born while she was in prison. Nino, who believes Nindi to be Roy's son, does not want to care for the youngster. Knowing that Nindi is Nino's child, Elsa ultimately dumps Nindi into an orphanage while claiming that Nindi has died.

== Cast ==
=== Main ===
- Amanda Manopo as Andini Kharisma Putri Alfahri: Aldebaran's wife. (Dead)
- Glenca Chysara as Elsa Anindita Prasetya
- Arya Saloka as Aldebaran Alfahri: Andin's husband.
- Evan Sanders as Elnino Prasetya
- Rionaldo Stockhorst as Devan Altarahman / Tegar Alfahri

=== Recurring ===
- Surya Saputra as Surya Lesmana
- Natasha Dewanti as Sarah Aurelia
- Ivanka Suwandi as Karina Larasati
- Sari Nila as Rossa Alfahri
- Ayya Renita as Kiki Aminarti
- Chika Waode as Mirna
- Ikbal Fauzi as Abdullah Rendy
- Jantuk as Uya
- Ariqa Fakhira Shakila as Nindi Kirani / Reyna Putri Alfahri
- Nadya Arina as Catherine Yulia Permadi
- Felix William Smith as Haryo Chandrawijaya
- Ziandru Alshad Arrajab / Muhammad Raffasya Saputra / Bianconeri Azhari as Askara Putra Alfahri
- Mayang Yudittia as Michelle Suwandi Permadi
- Raquel Katie as Siena Taliana
- Fara Shakila as Reyna Putri Alfahri
- Kevin Hillers as Erlangga Permadi
- Dini Vitri as Mayang
- Larasati Nugroho as Jessica Anabella Adicipta
- Ichal Muhammad as Bagas Fonseca
- Masran Sadindro as Dimas
- Christian Loho as Fajar
- Eriska Rein as Bella
- Reuben Elishama as Darren Abimana Abila
- Angga Ryan Putra as Sammy
- Anes Morgana as Ken
- Rebecca Tamara as Zara
- Naimma Aljufri as Namira
- Kinaryosih as Sekar
- Rachquel Nesia as Marsha
- Abun Hadi as Adnan: Namira's father
- Anjani Dina as Raisa Mutiara
- Marcell Darwin as Mario Dirgantara
- Yadi Timo as Amran
- Aryani Fitriana as Kirana
- Delon Mercy as Achmad Zidan Arroyan
- Verdi Solaiman as Prama Altarahman
- Erick Brone as Juno
- Figo Totih as Aril
- Masayu Anastasia as Arumi
- Wiwid Razak as Laras
- Shania Naveen as Nada Almira
- Vanesa Afrila as Sherly
- Ricky Miraza as Ronny
- Dita Rientika as Leni
- Fatmasury Dahlan as Nina
- Ferdi Ali as Permadi
- Naomi Zaskia as Nia
- Fellicya Reyni as Kayla
- Harini Sondakh as Yolanda
- Zahra Qareen as Siska
- Ammar Zoni as Ammar Mahendra
- Deva Mahenra as Sal Pradipta
- Irene Librawati as Wanda
- Binyo Rombot as Riza
- Rendi Jhon as Ricky Alexander Tanujaya
- Anastasya Panggabean as Felicia
- Abel Syahputra as Ipul
- Erick Arion as Sodikin
- Iwan Botak as Boim
- Teuku Dino as Iqbal Kusumahadi
- Naufal Alnauf as Hendry
- Achmad Syahriyatno as Jimmy
- Derie Febrian as Putra
- Ovi Sovianti as Nissa
- Setiawan Min as Tobbi
- Shirley Margaretha as Malika
- Crystal Aurora as Joanna
- Rherenata Wijaya as Erina
- Sigit del Ramdani as Yongki
- Oka Antara as Irvan Pratama Adicipta
- Fiki Alman as Royano Putra Alfahri
- Carlo Milk as Rafael
- Diego Afisyah as Gerry Bramasta
- Hanna V as Indira
- Denino as Martin
- Sonia Alyssa as Jennifer
- James Thomas as Jason
- Jourey Kenzie as Renaldi
- Raya Nurcintya as Diandra
- Rendy Penna as Restu
- Edrea Queen as Nayla
- Evelina Witanama as Olivia
- Rara Nawangsih as Sofia Paramita Adicipta
- Rommy Sulastyo as Hartawan Alfahri
- Mariana Putri as Neneng
- Dede Satria as Irvan Pratama Adicipta
- Aliyah Faizah as Cantika
- Bima Samudra as Purnomo
- Rizky Tama as Ferry Orlando
- Soraya Van Kraayenoord as Astri
- Johan Morgan Purba as Nicholas Firdaus
- Boim Waw as Sumarno
- Anisa Ratna as Laras
- Alkha Sultan as Danu
- Cep Hendra as Felix Bharata
- Cassandra Angelie as Verawati Damayanti
- Yogi Tama as Anwar
- Selvina Mandasari as Utari

=== Special appearances ===
- Lestari Nadibha as Tari
- Adi Sastro as Adi
- Ade Govinda as Himself (Episode 39)
- Andi Fadly Arifuddin as Himself (Episode 39)
- Zaverio Mirza as Dio (Episode 189)
- Vabyra Mauriz as Iin (episodes 190—191)
- Dede Wijaya as Joshua Irawan
- Ainayya Afiqa as Cindy (episodes 328—334)
- Arick Pramana as Sakti
- Izhar Bima as Anak buah Aldebaran (episodes 385 & 439)
- Sixrion Anggoro as Dwi (episodes 405—410)
- Yessi Kenyang as Doctor (episodes 419, 499 & 512)
- Abieza Arhabu as Aldebaran
- Boy William as Rendy's friend (Episode 485)
- Ridwan Kamil as Himself (Episode 638)
- Ranty Maria as Putri Aurora from Putri untuk Pangeran
- Verrell Bramasta as Pangeran Alexander from Putri untuk Pangeran
- Shirley Margaretha as Nawang Susilowati from Putri untuk Pangeran
- Reza Pahlevi as Raymond Turangga from Putri untuk Pangeran
- Minati Atmanagara as Soraya Gayatri from Putri untuk Pangeran
- Oding Siregar as Regar from Putri untuk Pangeran
- Harini Sondakh as Citra Marisca from Putri untuk Pangeran
- Evan Marvino as Atta Devandra from Putri untuk Pangeran
- Anrez Adelio as Gio Nathanio from Putri untuk Pangeran
- Naimma Aljufri as Dinda Silvana from Putri untuk Pangeran
- Galih Leo as Jojo Wahyudi from Putri untuk Pangeran
- Jefri Nichol as Jefri (Episode 751) to promote films My Sassy Girl
- Tiara Andini as Tiara (Episode 751) to promote films My Sassy Girl

== International broadcasts ==
Country	Series Programmes	Television channel	Series premiere	Series end
Malaysia	Ikatan Cinta	TV9	26 January 2022	2 June 2022
