= Formosa Hakka Radio =

Radio station of Taiwan

Formosa Hakka Radio 寶島客家廣播電台
Taiwan
- Broadcast area: Northern Taiwan
- Frequency: 93.7 MHz

Programming
- Language: Hakka

Ownership
- Operator: Liu Run-hui (Director)

History
- First air date: 1994

Links
- Website: Official website (in Chinese)

The Formosa Hakka Radio (FHR; traditional Chinese: 寶島客家廣播電台; simplified Chinese: 宝岛客家广播电台; pinyin: Bǎodǎo Kèjiā Guǎngbò Diàntái) is a Hakka-language radio station in Taiwan.

== History ==
The radio station was launched in 1994 as the first Hakka-language radio station in Taiwan.

== See also ==
- Hakka Affairs Council
- Media of Taiwan
- Hakka TV
- Hakka Taiwanese
