= Warso Moe Oo =

Burmese actress, model, and singer

- ဝါဆိုမိုးဦး
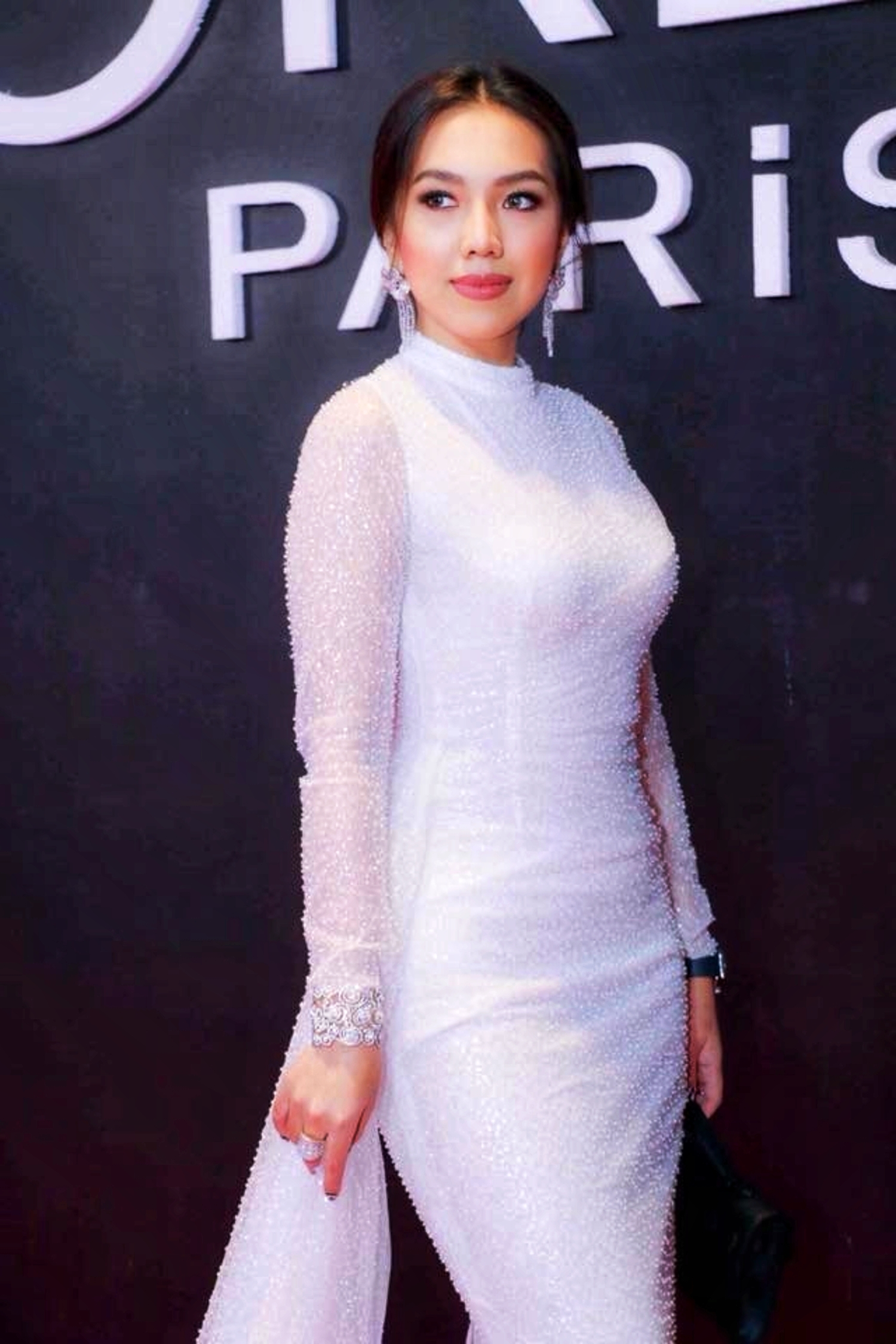
- Warso Moe Oo at an event
- Born: Warso Moe Oo; 27 July 1994 (age 31); Yangon, Myanmar
- Occupations: Actress, model, singer
- Years active: 2002–present
- Height: 5 ft 6 in (1.68 m)
- Partner: Phyo Lay (2017–present)
- Parent(s): Myo Myint Naing; Baby aka Khin Nwe Yi

Warso Moe Oo (Burmese: ဝါဆိုမိုးဦး; born 27 July 1994) is a Burmese actress, model and singer. She has achieved fame and success as both an actress and singer. Throughout her career, she has acted in over 200 films and has also released a solo album titled Mite Lar Pyaw Kyi.

== Early life and education ==
Warso Moe Oo was born on 27 July 1994 in Yangon, Myanmar to parents Myo Myint Naing and his wife Baby aka Khin Nwe Yi. She is the eldest daughter of two siblings, having a younger sister. She attended high school at Basic Education High School No. 2 Latha. She was temporarily suspended in high school for working as an actress.

== Acting career ==
She embarked on her acting career at the young age of 8, starting as a child actor. Her debut came in the film "Thanlwin Yay Bal Mhar Khan" (Thanlwin River where dried) in 2002. Since then, she has made numerous appearances in Burmese films, showcasing her talent as a child actor.

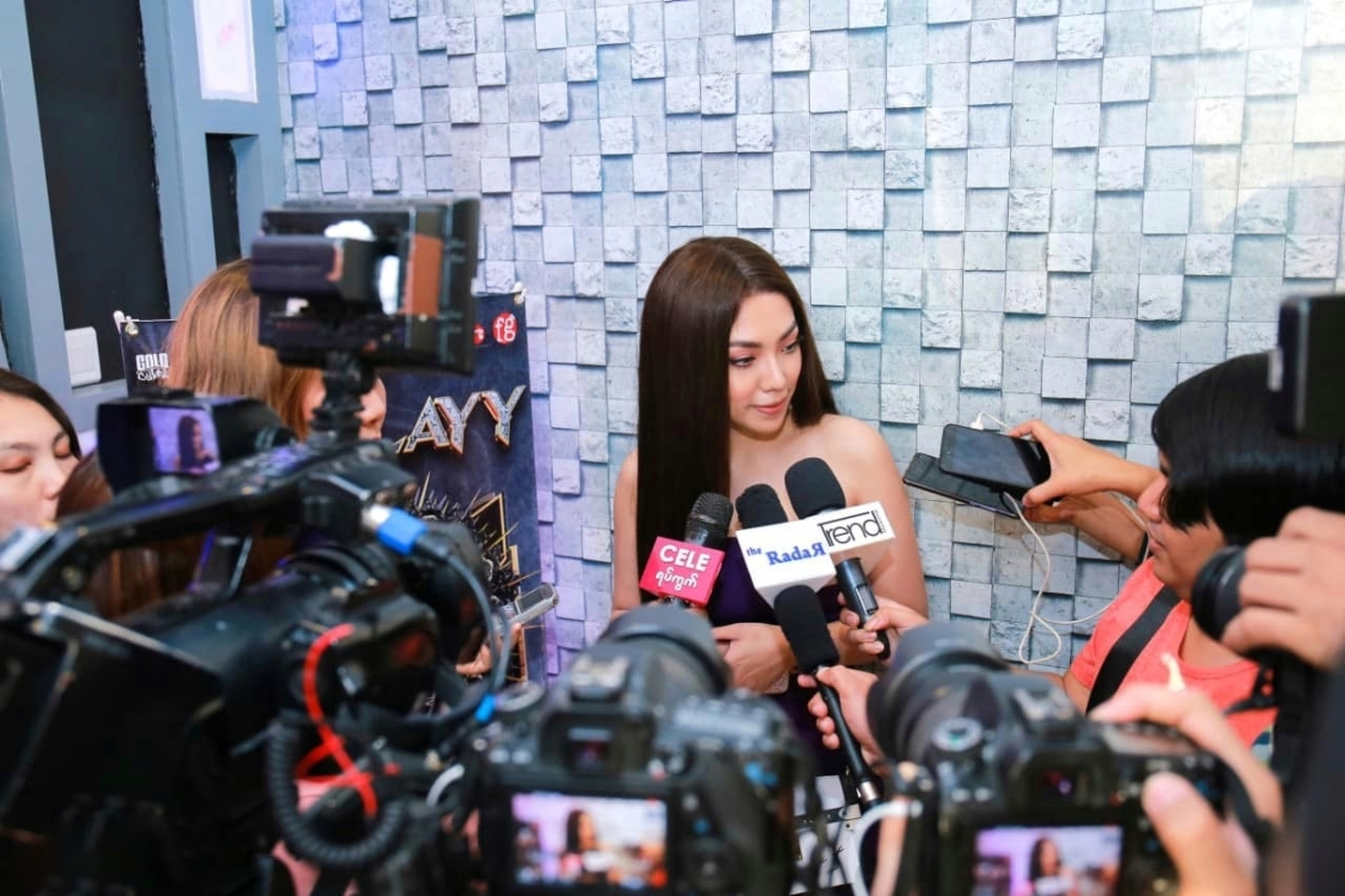
Warso is answered at the media interview

In 2008, Warso had the honor of participating as an Academy tray holder at the prestigious Myanmar Academy Awards Ceremony. Her role was to carry the coveted golden trophies presented to the winners of the Myanmar Academy Awards. This marked a significant moment in her career, as it garnered recognition and admiration from her fans. Subsequently, offers for TV commercials began to pour in. Her diligent work as a model and her appearances in commercials caught the eye of the film industry, leading to a stream of movie casting opportunities. Her ascent to stardom began in 2009 when she transitioned into acting, securing contracts with a production company in Myanmar. As their leading actress, she starred in more than 50 films. However, it was the film "Oasis" that truly propelled her into the spotlight, garnering her even more recognition and acclaim.

In 2012, she made her debut on the big screen with the film "Ogyi 30 Olay 500" (Big pot 30 small pot 500), where she shared the screen with Kyaw Kyaw Bo. In 2014, she portrayed the character of Manisanda in the historical documentary film "The Great Myanmar". Notably, this film was recognized as Myanmar's first 3D film and focused on depicting the history of the Pagan Kingdom. It was a collaborative effort between Forever Group and the South Korean Educational Broadcasting System (EBS). Since 2009 and up to the present time, she has impressively acted in over 200 videos and films. Sometime, she is an anyeint dancer with the Burmese traditional dance troupe Htawara Hninzi.

== Music career ==
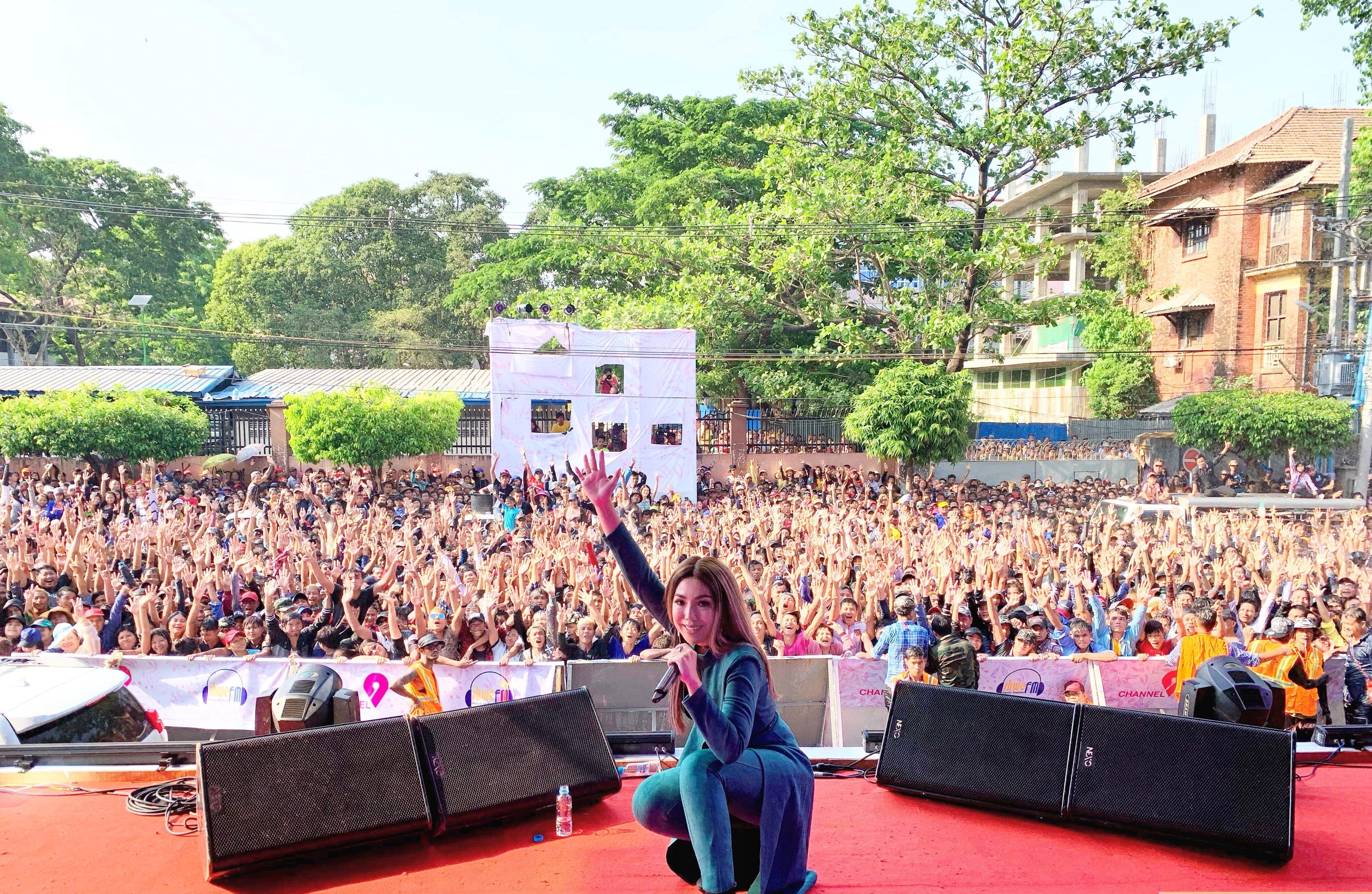
Warso is performing in a concert

Her initial venture into the music industry began when she performed the song "A Chit Ko A Yone A Kyi Ma Shi" at Shwe FM's anniversary event. This marked her introduction as a singer. Furthermore, she showcased her talent by participating in the opera during the opening ceremony of the 2013 Southeast Asian Games, which took place in Nay Pyi Taw, Myanmar on 22 December 2013. Following her performance at the SEA Games, she continued to engage in stage performances and held numerous concerts at various venues across Myanmar.

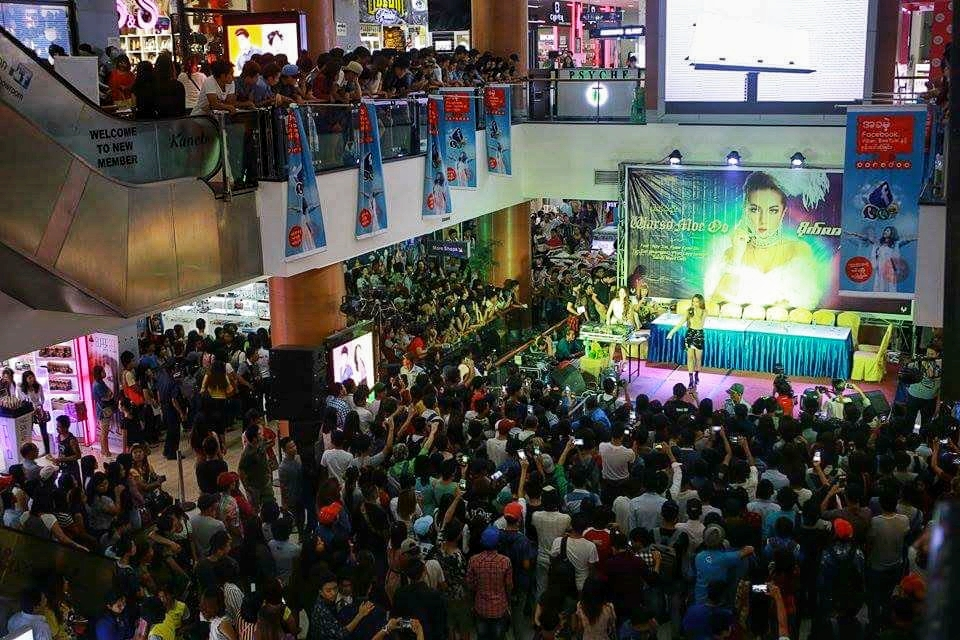
Warso is performing for her album Mite Lar Pyaw Kyi signing event on 2 March 2017

Warso was involved in the collaborative albums Shwe FM 4th Anniversary in 2013, Shwe FM 5th Anniversary in 2014, and Shwe FM 6th Anniversary in 2015. Starting from 2014, she began performing in Thingyan music concerts every year.

In 2015, Warso began her journey to create and release her inaugural solo album. On 2 March 2017, she unveiled her debut solo album titled Mite Lar Pyaw Kyi, which resulted in the creation of several more significant hits.

== Political activities ==
In response to the 2021 Myanmar coup d'état, Warso actively engaged in the anti-coup movement, both by participating in person at rallies and by using social media as a platform to express her opposition. Since February, she has been actively involved in protests, vehemently denouncing the military coup and advocating for democratic principles. She joined the "We Want Justice" three-finger salute movement. The movement was launched on social media, and many celebrities have joined the movement.

On 3 April 2021, warrants for her arrest were issued under section 505 (a) of the penal code by the State Administration Council for speaking out against the military coup. Along with several other celebrities, she was charged with calling for participation in the Civil Disobedience Movement (CDM) and damaging the state's ability to govern, with supporting the Committee Representing Pyidaungsu Hluttaw, and with generally inciting the people to disturb the peace and stability of the nation.

== Personal life ==
Since 2017, Warso has been romantically involved with hip hop artist Phyo Lay. The duo collaborates both musically and professionally, sharing their talents and working closely together.

== Filmography ==
=== Film (Cinema) ===
- Over 30 films, including
- Ogyi 30 Olay 500 (အိုးကြီး၃ဝ အိုးလေး၅ဝဝ) (2012)
- The Great Myanmar (ကြီးမြတ်သောမြန်မာ) (2018)

=== Film ===
- Over 170 films

== Discography ==
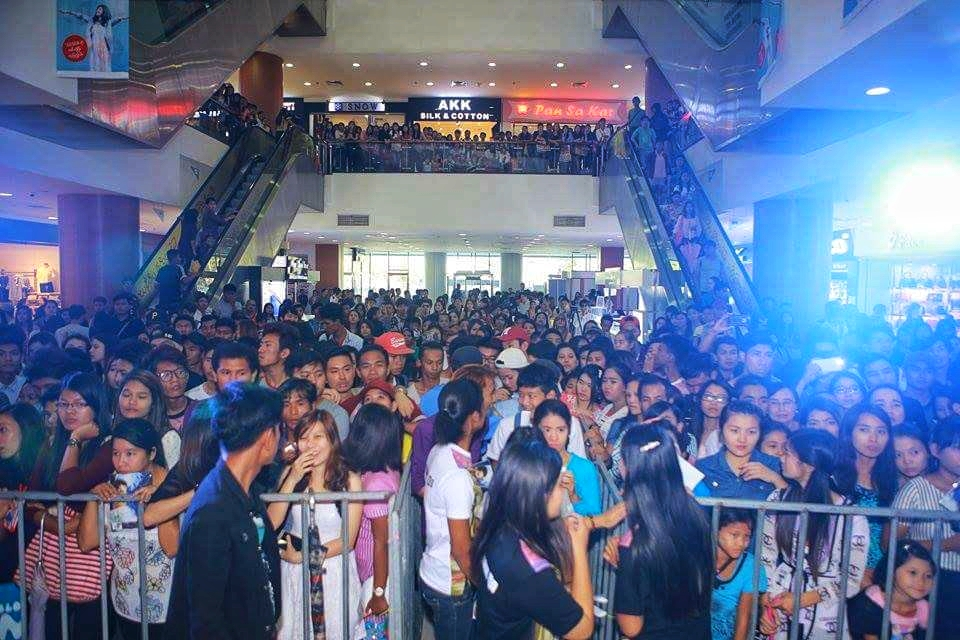
"Mite Lar Pyaw Kyi" album release event

=== Solo albums ===
- Mite Lar Pyaw Kyi (မိုက်လားပြောကြည့်) (2017)

=== Collaborative albums ===
- Shwe FM 4th Anniversary (2013)
- Shwe FM 5th Anniversary (2014)
- Shwe FM 6th Anniversary (2015)
