= The Only Mom =

2019 Burmese horror film

- Film poster
- Burmese: လိပ်ပြာစံအိမ်
- Directed by: Chartchai Ketnust
- Written by: Chartchai Ketnust; May Myo Han; Khin Myat Mon
- Starring: Nine Nine; Wutt Hmone Shwe Yi; Daung; Pyae Pyae
- Cinematography: Teerawat Rujenatham
- Edited by: Surasak Panklin; Max Tersch
- Music by: Vanilla Sky
- Production company: Brave Empire Film Production
- Distributed by: Brave Empire Film Production
- Release date: February 8, 2019
- Running time: 115 minutes
- Country: Myanmar
- Language: Burmese
- Box office: $4.8 million

The Only Mom (Burmese: လိပ်ပြာစံအိမ်, romanized: Lake Pyar San Eain) is a 2019 Burmese horror film starring Nine Nine, Wutt Hmone Shwe Yi, Daung and Pyae Pyae. The film, produced by Brave Empire Film Production, premiered in Myanmar on February 8, 2019, and became one of the highest-grossing Burmese films of the year. This film is exhibited in Myanmar, Singapore, Thailand, Vietnam, and other countries.

The Only Mom is widely regarded as one of the scariest horror films in Myanmar, earning positive reviews for its strong performances, cinematography, sound design, and background music. The movie generated significant box office success, earning MMK 100 million within nine days of its release and becoming the highest-grossing Burmese film of the year. To date, it has grossed $4.8 million worldwide, solidifying its status as a commercially successful Burmese production.

== Synopsis ==
A family of three relocated to a colonial-style mansion in Yenangyaung, which contained unique ancient photographs. From the moment they arrived, the couple's daughter, who had previously been disobedient, became unusually diligent and began acting strangely. She slept throughout the day and remained awake at night. Her odd behavior sparked curiosity. As a mother, she struggled to address these troubling changes. The unfolding events gradually revealed connections to the afterlife, adding an intriguing layer to the mystery.

== Plot ==
Nine Nine as Aung Thura, a magazine press editor, and his wife May(Wutt Hmone Shwe Yi), along with their autistic daughter Siri (Pyae Pyae), move to a quaint old colonial house in Yay-Nan-Chaung for Nine Nine's new job position. Despite May's efforts to connect with Siri, Siri has difficulty forming a strong bond with her mother, and often disregards May's attempts to communicate with her.

Upon their arrival at the house, Nine Nine stumbled upon antique glass photographs of the former owner of the house, Daung (the photographer), along with his adopted children adorning the walls. Captured using an old mirror photography technique, the photos exuded a lifelike quality, captivating Aung Thura's attention to make the decision to leave them as they were originally displayed.

During the second night, Siri awakens from her sleep and wanders around the house in search of her beloved doll. As she explores, she discovers another girl around her age playing with her doll in the attic. Instantly drawn to each other, Siri and the girl whose name is Thida (Ton Ton) form a quick bond, and play together throughout the night. Later, Thida explains to Siri that she has been watching over the house but omits the fact that she is a spirit who is trapped alongside her mother's spirit. Thida then offers Siri to take a picture using her father's camera in order to trick Siri to take her body away by capturing Siri's soul inside the camera.

Days and nights pass, Siri remains asleep all day, and awake only at nighttime, causing concern for her parents. Siri keeps going to bed after joyfully playing with her mother until it is dawn.

One night, Aung Thura is startled awake by what seemed to be Siri's voice calling for him through the air and falls into nightmares of Siri being abnormal. The next morning, Aung Thura stumbles upon an old photograph of the children who once resided in the house, tucked away in storage. Driven by a growing sense of unease, he embarks on an investigation, seeking out information about the fate of the children depicted in the photo.

Reluctant to entertain Aung Thura's doubts about possession, the mother refused to accept that her daughter was under any supernatural influence, especially as their relationship began to improve. Nevertheless, the parents decide to remove Siri from the house and seek assistance from a spirit medium known as “Nat Ka Taw” in Myanmar, in an attempt to rescue Siri's spirit. However, their efforts are blocked by the spirit of Daung, claiming himself also to be the mother of the adopted children. Left with no other options, May bravely jumps into a nearby lake, seeking a passage to the spirit realm.

It is not too long after Siri is saved, May accidentally passes away because of Thida's mother's (Daung) fierce spirit. May's spirit became trapped within the walls of the house alongside Thida, who had always wanted a sweet mother like May. Conversely, Daung's spirit found peace. Siri and Aung Thura, now free from the haunting presence, decide to depart from the town permanently, leaving behind the echoes of their sorrowful journey.

== Cast ==
- Nine Nine as Aung Thura, father of Thiri
- Wutt Mhone Shwe Yi as May Hnin, mother of Thiri
- Daung as the photographer
- Pyae Pyae (child actress) as Thiri
- Ton Ton (child actress) as Thida
- Thuta (child actor) as Htun Mya
- Aung Khant Paing (child actor) as Kyaw Zaww
- U Hla Aye as Nat Kadaw (medium)
- Zwe Nandar as Thiha
- Tar Tar Lay as U Nandiya
- Soe Moe Kyi as Teacher of Thiri

== Production ==
The film was directed by Chachai, a Thai director who made the movie From Bangkok to Mandalay. It was shown in 13 countries outside of Myanmar; Thai, Singapore, Philippine, Cambodia, Japan, Indonesia, Hong Kong, Malaysia, Taiwan, Brunei, Vietnam, Laos, and India. The film's special features are that a real goddess played the role and the scenes were filmed underwater without human replacements. The underwater scenes in this film were shot in an underwater studio in Thailand, and Wutt Mhone Shwe Yi said, "At the time of shooting, it was so bad that I didn't want to do another underwater shot."

=== Development ===
Following the success of "From Bangkok to Mandalay," director Chartchai Ketnust set his sights on a horror project titled "Burmese Night," exploring Myanmar's supernatural traditions. However, he shifted gears to realize his dream with the release of the Myanmar-language film "The Only Mom" in Thailand, already a hit in Myanmar.Navigating linguistic barriers, Chartchai collaborated with Myanmar sisters for his previous project. Inspired by the country's landscapes and spiritual beliefs, he chose Yenanchaung as the setting for "The Only Mom".Chartchai's storytelling reflects a commitment to cultural exchange, evident in his upcoming TV series on Thai-Myanmar history. Through his visionary approach, he continues to bridge cultural divides and enrich cinematic narratives, leaving an enduring impact on audiences.

=== Filming ===
Filming for "The Only Mom" began sometime before its February 2019 release date in Thailand. The exact start date remains unknown. Yenanchaung, an arid region in Myanmar, served as the film's main setting, with a colonial-style house filled with old photographs being a central location for much of the shoot. The film incorporated elements of Myanmar culture, including the concept of Nats (revered spirits) and a real-life Nat Kadaw (medium) named U Hla Aye. Additionally, the filmmakers employed the wet collodion process, a 19th-century photography technique, which may have required special setups to visually integrate with the film's themes.

== Music ==
The artist of The OST, “Until we meet again” is Khin Poe Panchi and written by Nay Win Htun & May Myo Han (inspired by the traditional Burmese lullaby song). Music Producer is Pongprom Sanitwong Na Ayutthaya. Another theme song is Thida's home which is written by Sayargyi Min Thuwun and the singer is Naw Green Rose.

== Distribution ==
=== Marketing ===
On November 12, 2018, the first image of the film was released via THE ONLY MOM official Facebook page, introducing the character Nat KaDaw. On November 30, 2018, the very first official teaser was released. The first official trailer was posted on YouTube on January 18, 2019.

=== Theatrical Release ===
The Only Mom was released on February 8, 2019. It was screened at cinemas in Thailand from April 4, 2019. It was available on Netflix from August 21, 2023.One week after, it ranked number 7 in the Top 10 Movies of Netflix Thai.The Only Mom is the first Myanmar movie to be shown on Netflix, a world-famous platform.

== Reception ==
=== Box Office ===
After nine days of its release, the movie got hundred ten thousand in box office The movie was named the best-grossing Myanmar movie of the year and now it has $4.8 million worldwide box office gross.

=== Critical Response ===
There are critical responses toward the ending of the movie. The reviews from IMDb mostly point out to the confused ending theory of the spirits.

== Awards and nominations ==
Year	Award	Category	Nominee	Result
2019	Asian Academy Creative Awards (Regional)	Best Feature Film	The Only Mom	Won
2019	Asian Academy Creative Awards (Regional)	Best Direction	Chartchai Ketnust	Won
2019	Asian Academy Creative Awards (Regional)	Best Actress in a Leading Role	Wutt Hmone Shwe Yi	Won
2019	Asian Academy Creative Awards (Regional)	Best Actress in a Supporting Role	Pyae Pyae	Won
2019	Asian Academy Creative Awards (Regional)	Best Cinematography	Teerawat Rujenatham	Won
2019	Asian Academy Creative Awards (Regional)	Best Theme Song	"Until we meet again" Khin Poe Panchi	Won
2019	Asian Academy Creative Awards (Grand Final)	Best Actress in a leading Role	Wutt Hmone Shwe Yi	Nominated
2019	Asian Academy Creative Awards (Grand Final)	Best Actress in a Supporting Role	Pyae Pyae	Won
2019	Myanmar Motion Picture Academy Awards	Best Actress	Wutt Hmone Shwe Yi	Nominated
