= City Hunter (2024 film) =

2024 live-action film

- Japanese: シティーハンター
- Directed by: Yūichi Satō
- Screenplay by: Tatsuro Mishima
- Based on: City Hunter by Tsukasa Hojo
- Produced by: Keisuke Sampei; Kosuke Oshida
- Starring: Ryohei Suzuki; Misato Morita; Masanobu Ando; Asuka Hanamura; Ayame Misaki; Moemi Katayama; Ami 201; Tetta Sugimoto; Takaya Sakoda; Fumino Kimura; Isao Hashizume
- Music by: Eishi Segawa
- Production company: Horipro
- Distributed by: Netflix
- Release date: April 25, 2024
- Country: Japan
- Language: Japanese

City Hunter (Japanese: シティーハンター, Hepburn: Shitī Hanta) is a Japanese live-action film based on the manga of the same name by Tsukasa Hojo and part of its media franchise. The film was directed by Yūichi Satō from a screenplay by Tatsuro Mashima and produced by Horipro, the film was released on Netflix on April 25, 2024.

== Cast ==
Character	Actor
Ryo Saeba	Ryohei Suzuki
Kaori Makimura	Misato Morita
Hideyuki Makimura	Masanobu Ando
Saeko Nogami	Asuka Hanamura

== Production ==
The film was announced on December 14, 2022, becoming the first City Hunter live-action adaptation to be produced in Japan and Ryohei Suzuki was cast in the lead role. On January 20, 2023, Misato Morita was cast in the role of Kaori Makimura. On February 23, 2024, Masanobu Ando and Asuka Hanamura joined the cast as Hideyuki Makimura and Saeko Nogami respectively. The ending theme is titled "Get Wild Continual", performed by TM Network.
