= Da Ai Television =

Television channel in Taiwan

- Country: Taiwan
- Broadcast area: global
- Headquarters: Taipei, Taiwan

Programming
- Language: Mandarin Chinese

Ownership
- Owner: Tzu Chi
- Key people: Cheng Yen

History
- Launched: January 1, 1998

Links
- Website: https://www.daai.tv

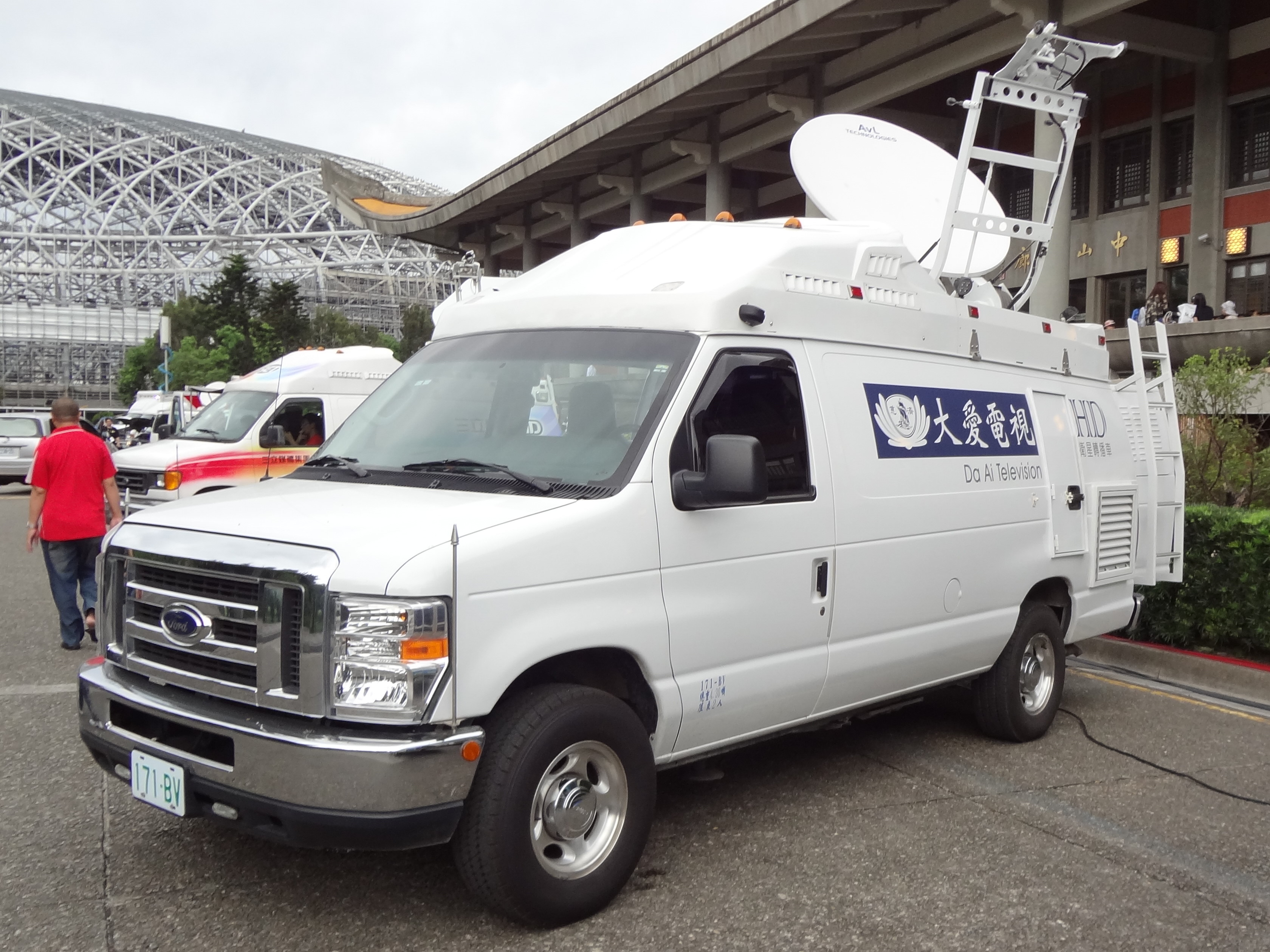
Da Ai Television's news van in 2015.

Da Ai Television (Chinese 大愛電視, dà ài diànshì) is a TV channel operated by a Buddhist charity organisation Tzu Chi.

== History ==
Da Ai Television was founded in 1998 by Tzu Chi. The channel produces most of its programs by itself, and the programming doesn't include politics or violent content. The channel is religious by nature and it teaches dharma under Cheng Yen's guidance. The channel's stance is that people are good by default as Buddhism teaches.

The channel primarily broadcasts in Mandarin Chinese but also produces a portion of its content in English. The channel also broadcasts children's shows.

In 2012, the channel moved into HD quality.
