= Grisse =

2018 historical drama miniseries

- Genre: Drama; Historical fiction
- Written by: Mike Wiluan; Rayya Makarim
- Directed by: Tony Tilse; Mike Wiluan
- Country of origin: Indonesia
- Original language: English
- No. of series: 1
- No. of episodes: 8

Production
- Executive producers: Mike Wiluan; Jonathan Spink; Jessica Kam; Garon Desilva
- Producers: Freddie Yeo; Kimberly James
- Cinematography: Wase Muller
- Running time: 48–55 minutes

Original release
- Network: HBO Asia
- Release: 4 November – 23 December 2018

Grisse is an action historical drama television miniseries developed for HBO Asia by Mike Wiluan.

== Plot ==
This series revolves around Dutch occupation of Indonesia, in particular a town called Grisse.

A beautiful Indonesian girl is attacked at her home and her mother and younger brother are both killed. She retaliates and kills the interlopers, but is arrested and sentenced to death. Just before her sentence is seen through she leads locals in a successful revolt.

== Cast ==
- Adinia Wirasti as Kalia
- Marthino Lio as Maran
- Michael Wahr as Moresby
- Joanne Kam as Chi
- Zack Lee as Jambu
- Toshiji Takeshima as Ryuichi
- Edward Akbar as Adnan
- Ully Triani as Lena
- Tom De Jong as De Witt
- Hossan Leong as Zengwei
- Wafda Saifan as Bakda
- Kelly Tandiono as Hidayat
- Alexandra Gottardo as Harsha

== Episodes ==
Series	Episodes	Originally released	
Series	Episodes	First released	Last released
1	8	4 November 2018	23 December 2018

No. overall	No. in season	Title	Directed by	Written by	Original release date
1	1	"Episode 1"	Tony Tilse	Leri Jiyuan, Mike Wiluan, Rayya Makarim	4 November 2018
2	2	"Episode 2"	Tony Tilse	Rayya Makarim, Mike Wiluan	11 November 2018
3	3	"Episode 3"	Tony Tilse	Rayya Makarim, Mike Wiluan	18 November 2018
4	4	"Episode 4"	Tony Tilse	Mike Wiluan, Rayya Makarim	25 November 2018
5	5	"Episode 5"	Tony Tilse	Rayya Makarim, Mike Wiluan	2 December 2018
6	6	"Episode 6"	Tony Tilse	Leri Jiyuan, Mike Wiluan, Rayya Makarim	9 December 2018
7	7	"Episode 7"	Tony Tilse	Leri Jiyuan, Mike Wiluan, Rayya Makarim	16 December 2018
8	8	"Episode 8"	Tony Tilse, Mike Wiluan	Mike Wiluan, Rayya Makarim	23 December 2018

== Production ==
=== Development ===
Grisse was developed by HBO Asia in collaboration with Infinite Studios, a Singapore-based company.

=== Casting ===
The cast includes actors from Singapore, Malaysia, Indonesia, Japan and Europe.

=== Filming ===
Principal photography on the eight-episode series began in May 2018.
