= Amanda Manopo =

Indonesian television actress (born 1999)

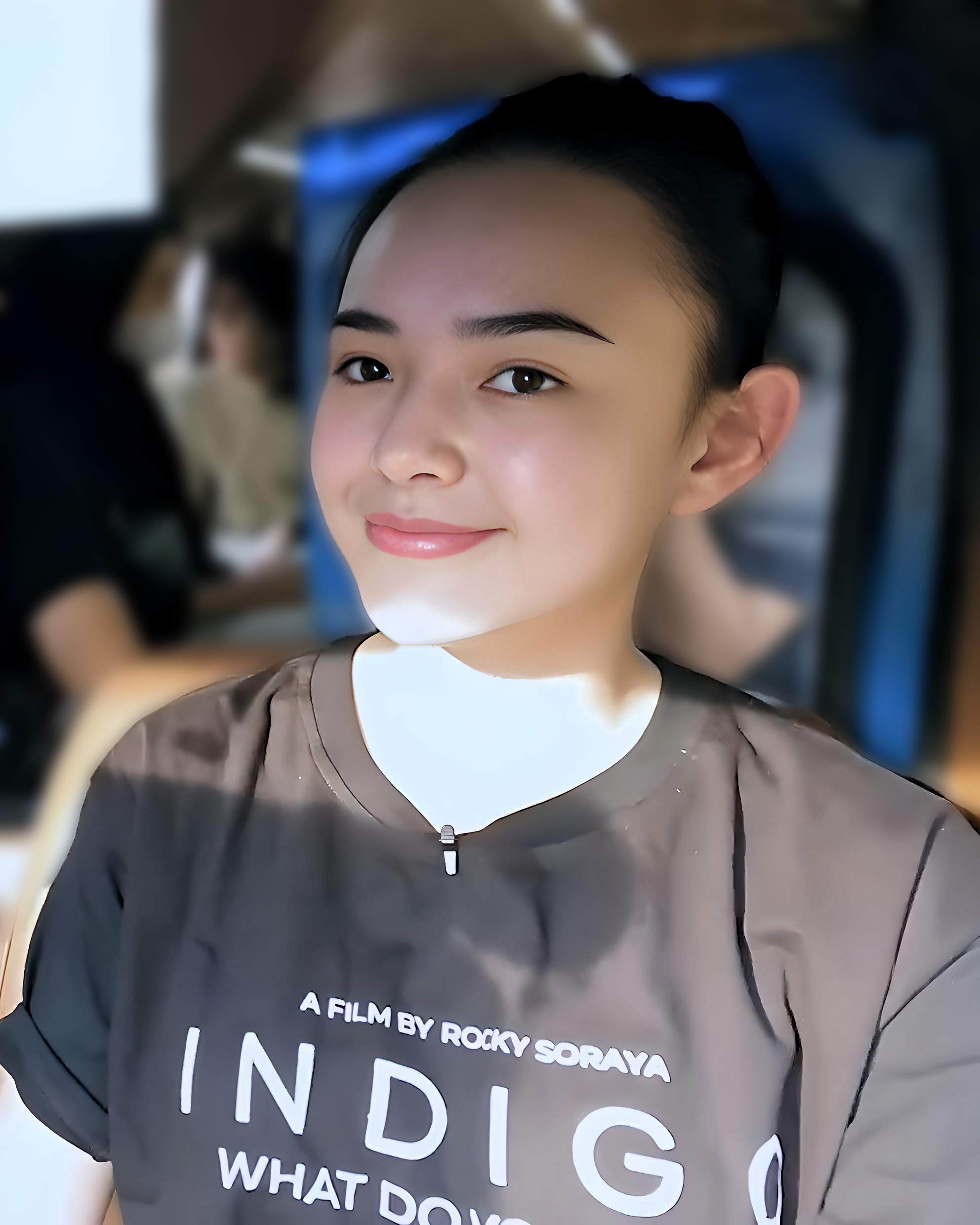
- Manopo in 2023
- Born: Amanda Gabriella Manopo Lugue; 6 December 1999 (age 26); Jakarta, Indonesia
- Other name: Amanda Manopo
- Occupations: Actor; model; singer; entrepreneur
- Years active: 2008–present
- Musical career
- Genre: Pop
- Instrument: Vocals
- Years active: 2017–present
- Labels: Le Moesiek Revole; MyMusic

Amanda Gabriella Manopo Lugue (born 6 December 1999) is an Indonesian-Filipino actor, model, singer, and entrepreneur.

== Filmography ==
=== Film ===
Year	Title	Role	Notes
2012	Sampai Ujung Dunia	Young Lilik	
2013	Coboy Junior the Movie	Lofly	
2013	Wanita Tetap Wanita	Young Nurma	
2017	Surat Cinta untuk Starla	Gadis	Cameo
2018	Sajen	Alanda Adriana	
2018	Bisikan Iblis	Nany	
2019	Suara April	Nur Laela	
2019	Kelam	Fenny	
2020	Kajeng Kliwon	Agni	
2023	Indigo: What Do You See?	Zora	
2024	Kupu-Kupu Kertas	Ning	
2024	Bila Esok Ibu Tiada	Rania	
2025	1 Imam 2 Makmum	Anika	
