= Mewatch =

Singaporean entertainment/lifestyle website

mewatch
- Logo used since 2023
- Website type: OTT
- Available in: English, Malay, Mandarin, Tamil
- Owner: Mediacorp
- Website: mewatch.sg
- Commercial: Yes
- Registration: Free
- Launched: 1 February 2013; 13 years ago (as Toggle); 30 January 2020; 6 years ago (as mewatch)
- Current status: Active

mewatch, formerly known as Toggle, is a Singaporean digital video on demand service owned and operated by Mediacorp. It was launched on 1 February 2013 as an over-the-top media service and an entertainment and lifestyle website Toggle.

On 1 April 2015, xinmsn, a joint venture between Mediacorp and Microsoft, was closed down and merged with Toggle. Before this, the brand co-existed with the Toggle service. On 30 January 2020, Toggle was renamed as mewatch.

== History ==
Toggle offered video streaming or on-demand content of programs from Mediacorp's archived library as well as original webseries. In addition, mewatch also offers live streaming of Mediacorp's free-to-air channels, which is only available in Singapore. It also offers catch-up TV for viewers to watch shows they have missed on prime time TV shows from the previous days.

In 2016, Toggle began to offer made-for-digital productions under the brand Toggle Originals. Certain original series, such as I Want to Be a Star may be telecasted on Mediacorp's television channels, typically in the late night programming slots.

In 2019, Toggle began offering additional content from HBO Go. In the same year, Mediacorp and Wattpad inked partnership for developing scripted series and films for Toggle and Mediacorp FTA channels, based on books made by Wattpad writers that are based in Singapore. On 30 May 2019, Toggle began offering on-demand Korean movies from tvN Movies.

On 30 January 2020, Toggle was renamed mewatch. At the same time, Mediacorp made a content deal with HOOQ to stream the latter's original content. However, on 27 March 2020, HOOQ filed for liquidation, shut down on 30 April 2020, and eventually was acquired by Coupang in July 2020 in order to being used as the basis of its streaming service named Coupang Play.

mewatch had carried content such as anime and Mandarin content, along with premium channels including Rock Entertainment, HBO Asia (until September 2024) and Animax (until 15 September 2025). They also have music channels such as Trace Urban and Now Rock.

In late 2025, mewatch formed a bundle agreement with StarHub to carry the latter's content plans including access to several channels (e.g. TVBS, KBS World, Astro) and live/on-demand broadcast rights to the Premier League football.

== Logo history ==
Toggle first logo (2013–2015)

Toggle second and last logo (2015–2020)

mewatch first logo (2020–2023)

mewatch second and current logo (2023–present)
