= Hakka TV =

- Type: Free-to-air
- Country: Taiwan
- Broadcast area: Taiwan

Programming
- Language: Taiwanese Hakka
- Picture format: 1080i HDTV (downscaled to 480i for the SD feed)

Ownership
- Owner: Public Television Service

History
- Launched: July 1, 2003; 22 years ago

Links
- Website: https://www.hakkatv.org.tw/

Availability

Terrestrial
- Digital terrestrial television: Channel 13

Hakka TV
- Traditional Chinese: 客家電視台
- Simplified Chinese: 客家电视台
Transcriptions
Standard Mandarin
- Hanyu Pinyin: Kèjiā Diànshìtái
Hakka
- Pha̍k-fa-sṳ: Hak-ka Thìen-shì-thôi
Yue: Cantonese
- Jyutping: Haak^{3}gaa^{1} Din^{6}si^{6}toi^{4}

Hakka TV (simplified Chinese: 客家电视台; traditional Chinese: 客家電視台; Pha̍k-fa-sṳ: Hak-ka Thìen-shì-thôi) is a Hakka language satellite cable channel operated by Taiwan Broadcasting System (TBS) in Taiwan, launched on July 1, 2003.

The Council for Hakka Affairs monitored the station until Taiwanese legislators added it to the Taiwan Broadcasting System in April 2011. It is the only television station in the world that chiefly televises its programmes in the Hakka language. Taiwan Today said, "Hakka TV’s success owes much to its high-quality dramas, many of which draw inspiration from Hakka literature."

== See also ==
- Hakka Affairs Council
- Media of Taiwan
- Han Taiwanese
- Taiwanese people
- Formosa Hakka Radio
