= Hooq =

Singaporean video streaming service

- Company type: Joint venture (former); Private (current)
- Website type: OTT platform (former); OTT meta search platform (current)
- Available in: English, Thai, Indonesian
- Founded: 30 January 2015
- Dissolved: 30 April 2020
- Predecessors: Singtel (65%); Sony Pictures (17.5%); Warner Bros. (17.5%)
- Successors: Hedley Digital (now SEO Korea); Coupang Play
- Headquarters: Singapore
- Area served: Singapore; Philippines; Thailand; India; Indonesia
- Key people: Peter Bithos (CEO) (former); Jay Bae (CEO) (current)
- Products: Video streaming
- Website: https://hooq.tv
- Current status: Inactive

Hooq (stylised in all caps, pronounced like hook) was a Singaporean video on demand streaming service. A joint venture of Singtel, Sony Pictures and Warner Bros., it had a presence in the Philippines, Thailand, India, Indonesia, and Singapore. Hooq was valued at $420 million in March 2015. The company filed for liquidation on 27 March 2020, and shut down on 30 April 2020, its assets were acquired by Coupang.

== History ==
Hooq was a joint venture of Singtel, Sony Pictures and Warner Bros., established on 30 January 2015, when the presence of Netflix in Asia was still limited. An online streaming video platform, Hooq was intended to capitalise on Singtel's reach and distribution to deliver movies, television series, as well as local programming to Asian markets. It also produced original content to attract subscribers, starting with a mini-series based on the movie On the Job, which revolves around political assassinations in the Philippines.

The platform was progressively launched in the Philippines, Thailand, India, Indonesia, and Singapore in 2015 and 2016. The content on the platform was accessed with a monthly or yearly subscription fee.

Hooq was named "Best Mobile App" in the Media, Film, TV or Video category at the GSMA's Global Mobile Awards 2016 in Barcelona.

Due to its fast growing, but loss-making status in Singtel's portfolio, an initial public offering was considered in 2019. However, on 27 March 2020, Hooq filed for liquidation, citing "significant structural changes" that had occurred in the over-the-top video market and its competitive landscape. Its global staff of 240 was laid off during the liquidation. Hooq shut down on 30 April 2020. The shutdown had left filmmakers, like Anthony Chen, saddled with debts from the films and shows they produced for the service as their tranche payment terms allowed them to fully pay the filmmakers after the produciton is completed.

== Ownership ==
Singtel owned 65 percent of Hooq's shares, while Sony Pictures and Warner Bros. each owned 17.5 percent. The share structure remained unchanged when it raised an additional US$25,000,000 in 2017. On 27 March 2020, when announcing its plans for liquidation, it was revealed that Singtel had an indirect control of 76.5 percent of the company.

In July 2020, South Korean e-commerce company Coupang acquired Hooq's software assets, which are being used as the basis of its own service Coupang Play.

In early 2024, South Korean search engine marketing company Hedley Digital (now known as SEO Korea) acquired Hooq's digital assets.
