= Eslam Jawaad =

- Born: Wissam Khodur
- Origin: Lebanon/Syria
- Genres: Hip hop, political hip hop, Arabic hip hop, trip hop

Wissam Khodur (Arabic: وسام خضر), better known as Eslam Jawaad (Arabic: اسلام جواد), is a rapper of Lebanese-Syrian origin. His debut album, The Mammoth Tusk, was released in 2009.

== Career ==
Jawaad moved to the United Kingdom in 2003 to pursue a career in Arabic hip-hop. Originally from Beirut, Jawaad studied Arabic history at university before deciding to shift his focus to music. After relocating to London, he quickly gained recognition in the music industry. Within his first year in the UK, Jawaad's work caught the attention of Cilvaringz, an associate of the Wu-Tang Clan, who subsequently signed him to his label. Jawaad was featured on the 2007 Cilvaringz album I.

Jawaad's debut album, The Mammoth Tusk, was released in 2009 and included collaborations with GZA, RZA, De La Soul, and Damon Albarn.

In addition to his solo career, Jawaad is a founding member of the Arab hip-hop collective known as "Arap", which consisted of himself, Mohalim, Cilvaringz, Ledr P, and Shadia Mansour. Associated acts included Malikah, DJ Lethal Skillz, RGB (kitaa Beirut), L'Hamorabi, Rasta Pharaoh, and Miskeena. Salah Edin, who founded the group with Eslam and Cilvaringz, left the group in 2009, and the group itself ceased to record soon after. Though the band never released a studio album, they gave notable momentum to the Arab hip-hop movement through their tours and limited releases.

Jawaad's first international tour was with Wu-Tang Killa Beez. It was this that led to his collaboration with RZA and GZA on his album song "So Real". His most recent endeavor with Wu-Tang is his co-executive producer credit on the single-copy, 2015 Wu-Tang Clan album Once Upon A Time in Shaolin. He has also toured with acts including Gorillaz, The Good, the Bad and the Queen, Fun-da-mental, and Africa Express.

Jawaad was instrumental in bringing friend and musical collaborator Damon Albarn to Syria to record with the Syrian National Orchestra for Arabic Music. Recordings from these sessions made it onto the Gorillaz album Plastic Beach, with the Orchestra alongside Albarn and Jawaad touring under the Africa Express banner in 2016.

In 2022, Jawaad founded an artist collective known as ARXP Cartel. The collective brings together artists from across the MENA region and creates opportunities for local and international collaborations. The collective's first release, "Styla Jamaiki", featured Algeria's Didine Canon 16, Seidosimba from Sudan, Shahyn from Egypt, and intl. Dancehall artist Stylo G alongside Jawaad. Their second effort, "Dokhan", released in 2023, featured Jawaad, Lebanese/Algerian Malikah, Didine Canon 16, and the Syrian Moudy Al Arabe. Both songs were featured in Dubai Bling and Real House Wives of Dubai, along with "IZA", a collaborative single between Jawaad and Hamorabi.

== Personal life ==
Jawaad has three children and lives in Dubai. After working as Executive Director for Global Gumbo Group, Quincy Jones LA and Dubai-based company, and Spotify as Head of Artist & Label Partnerships across the Middle East and North Africa, and then as Vice President of A&R and Acquisitions at Abu Dhabi based PopArabia, Jawaad founded Bespoke Music Acquisitions focusing on global music and IP brokerage.

== Discography ==
- Eslam Jawaad - The Mammoth Tusk (2009)
- The Good, the Bad & the Queen - Mr. Whippy (2007)
- Cilvaringz - I (2007)
- Gorillaz - Plastic Beach (2010)
- Gorillaz - Clint Eastwood (Eslam Jawaad Version- Live) (2010)
- Fun-Da-Mental - All is War (The Benefits of G-Had) (2006)
- Visionary Underground - Keep The Grime On (2005)
- Souterrain Productions - 50 MC's Vol. 2 (2005)
- 7th Century Records - Palestine The Album (2009)
- Darwish - 7th Sky (2004)
- Darwish - Today's Democracy (2006)
- Salah Edin - HORR (2009)
- Salah Edin - The Official Mix Tape (2006)
- Peace is my religion, music is my weapon - Mixtape (2011)
- Peace is my religion, music is my weapon - Palestine Vol. 2 (2012)
- Lowkey - Long Live Palestine 2 (2009)
- Nickodemus - A Dubai Minute (2012)
- Le Jakal - Alchemistas (2008)
- UK Apache - Concrete Jungle (2009)
- Fun-Da-Mental - A Philosophy of Nothing (2015)
- Wu-Tang Clan - Swords Stained With Royal Blood - from the single copy album Once Upon A Time In Shaolin (2015)
- Gorillaz - White Flag - Live version taken from Africa Express Presents: The Orchestra of Syrian Musicians & Guests (2016)
- Hamorabi & Eslam Jawaad - Iza (2021)
- ARXP Cartel - Styla Jamaiki (2022)

His song "Pivot Widdit" was used in the Dubai film City of Life, and "Siasa" in Hollywood blockbuster Rendition.
