= The Mammoth Tusk =

Studio album by Eslam Jawaad
- Released: 6 July 2009
- Recorded: 2008–2009
- Genre: Hip hop, Arabic hip hop, rap, political hip hop
- Length: 50 minutes
- Label: Eslamaphobic & RPEG Ltd
- Producer: Eslam Jawaad, De La Soul, Damon Albarn, Focus, Shadia Mansour, Miskeena, Lord Sear, DJ Maseo, Narcy, GZA, Ledr P, Omar Offendum, The RZA DJ Lady S, DJ Vans, Wu-Tang Clan & Cilcaringz

Singles from The Mammoth Tusk
- 1. "Rewind DJ" Released: 12 January 2009; 2. "Pivot Widdit" Released: 17 May 2009

Professional ratings
Review scores
| Source | Rating |
|---|---|
| BBC Music | 4/5 stars |
| IndieLondon | 3.5/5 stars |

The Mammoth Tusk is the first album by the Lebanese-Syrian rapper Eslam Jawaad, released on 6 July 2009. It features guest collaborations by Miskeena, Lord Sear, Shadia Mansour and Rude Jude. The album also has more mainstream performers including De La Soul and Damon Albarn. The song "Pivot Widdit" was used in the Dubai film City of Life.

== Track listing ==
1. "Pivot Widdit" - 3:26
2. "Star Spangled Banner" - 3:05
3. "Tickle My Pickle" (featuring Miskeena) - 3:40
4. "Rewind DJ" (featuring De La Soul) - 4:37
5. "Baba's Shotgun" - 1:21
6. "Trick" - 3:10
7. "Leave it Alone" - 3:06
8. "It Wasn't Me (Skit)" (featuring Lord Sear and Rude Jude) - 1:15
9. "Criminuhl" - 3:20
10. "Heave Ho" - 3:52
11. "The Mammoth Tusk" - 4:18
12. "Big Slingaz'" - 4:09
13. "So Real" (featuring Shadia Mansour)
14. "Alarm Chord" (featuring Damon Albarn) - 3:29
15. "Beirut" - 3:52
