= List of Arab rappers =

The following is a list of Arab rappers.

Name	country	Description
El Général	Tunisia	Hamada Ben Amor (Arabic: حمادة بن عمر), better known by his stage name El Général (Arabic: الجنرال), is a Tunisian rap musician. His song "Rais Lebled", released in December 2010, has been described as the "anthem of the Jasmine Revolution".
Shadia Mansour	Palestine UK	Shadia Mansour (Arabic: شادية منصور Shādiyah Manṣūr, born 1985), also known as "the first lady of Arabic hip hop" is a British Palestinian singer and MC who sings and raps in Arabic and English. Much of her music focuses on Middle East politics.
Salah Edin	Morocco Netherlands	Salah Edin gained recognition as a rapper (first in Arabic, then also in Dutch) in the 1990s and broke through to a larger audience in 2006 when he signed with Dutch hip-hop label TopNotch. His third album, WOII, was slated for release in September 2011; the title is a reference to World War II, but carries other connotations as well, with the initials also referring to Willem Oltmans and Geert Wilders. That same year, he acted in a short Moroccan film, with another film already finished and a TV series in the making.
Ahmed Mekky (actor)	Egypt	Ahmad Mekky (Arabic: أحمد مكي; born June 19, 1980) is an Egyptian television and stage actor, writer, director, and rapper.
Narcy	Iraq Canada	Yassin Alsalman, better known by his stage name The Narcicyst (or Narcy), is an Iraqi-Canadian journalist and Hip Hop MC. He currently resides in Montreal, Canada, and raps in English.
Leesaseal	Saudi Arabia	Aseel Seraj (Arabic: أسيل سراج, born July 10, 1999), better known by her stage name Leesa (or Leesaseal), is a Saudi Arabian veiled rapper. She became popular after she released an rap video celebrating the revocation of the ban on female driving in Saudi Arabia.

== See also ==
- Lists of musicians
