= Refugees of Rap =

Hip-hop group

Refugees Of Rap
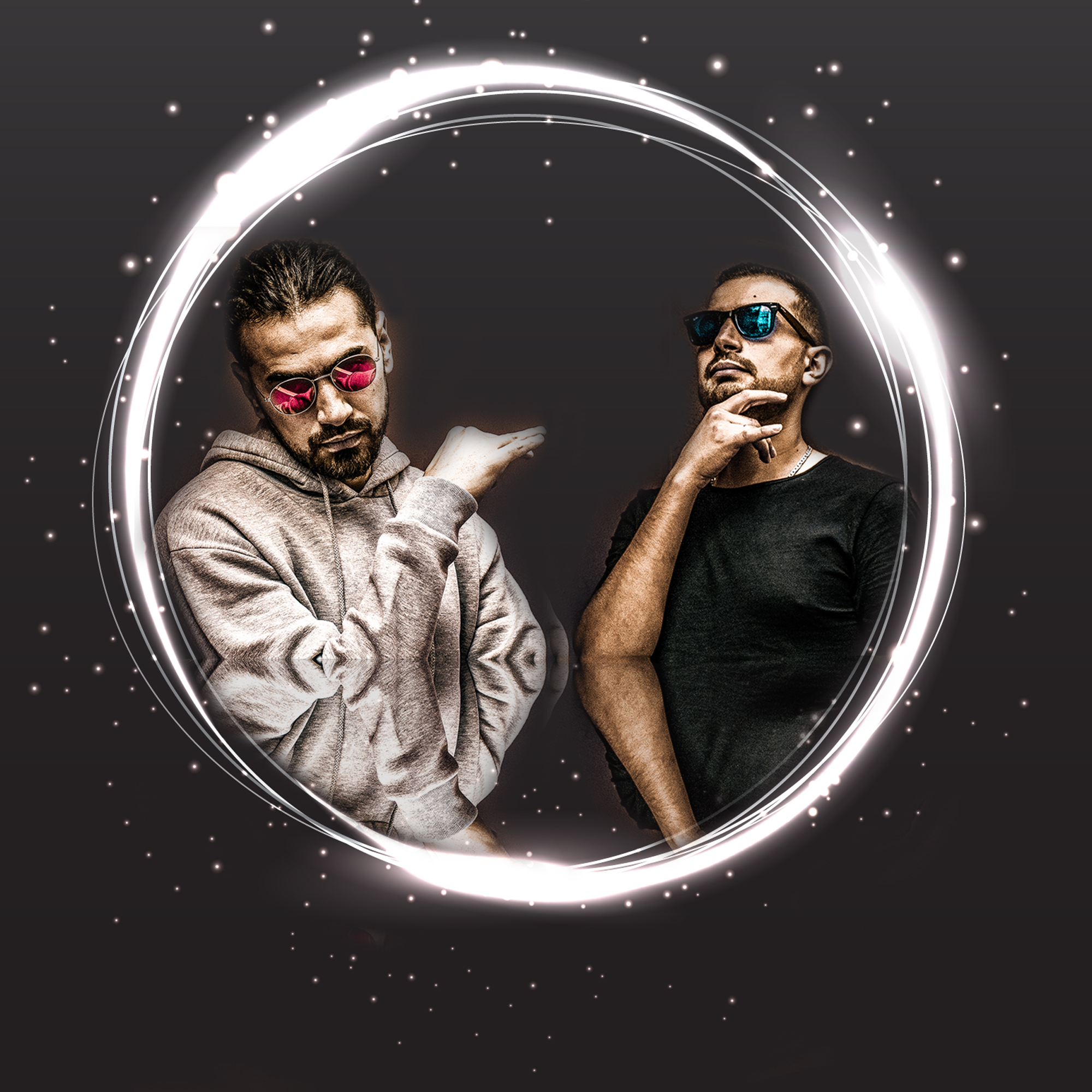

Background information
- Born: Damascus, Yarmouk Camp,
- Origin: Syria, Palestine
- Genres: Arabic Hip Hop, Trap, Rap
- Years active: 2007–present
- Labels: Refugees Of Rap
- Members: Yaser Jamous; Mohamed Jamous
- Website: http://www.facebook.com/refugeesofrap

Refugees Of Rap (Arabic: لاجئي الراب; French: "Les Réfugiés Du Rap") is a Syrian - Palestinian hip-hop group.

== Career ==
Brothers Yaser and Mohamed Jamous created the group Refugees Of Rap in 2007 while settled in a Palestinian refugee camp in Yarmouk, Syria. Their texts offer a glimpse of life in the camp and denounce the situation in Syria. They were forced into exile in 2013 and become refugees in France the same year.

From their collaboration came several artistic projects. Two albums were released in 2010 and 2014 and are the result of various collaborations such as Tamer Nafar(DAM), Tarabband, and Linda Bitar. After their 2010 album, "Face to Face," was released, they got their own recording studio.

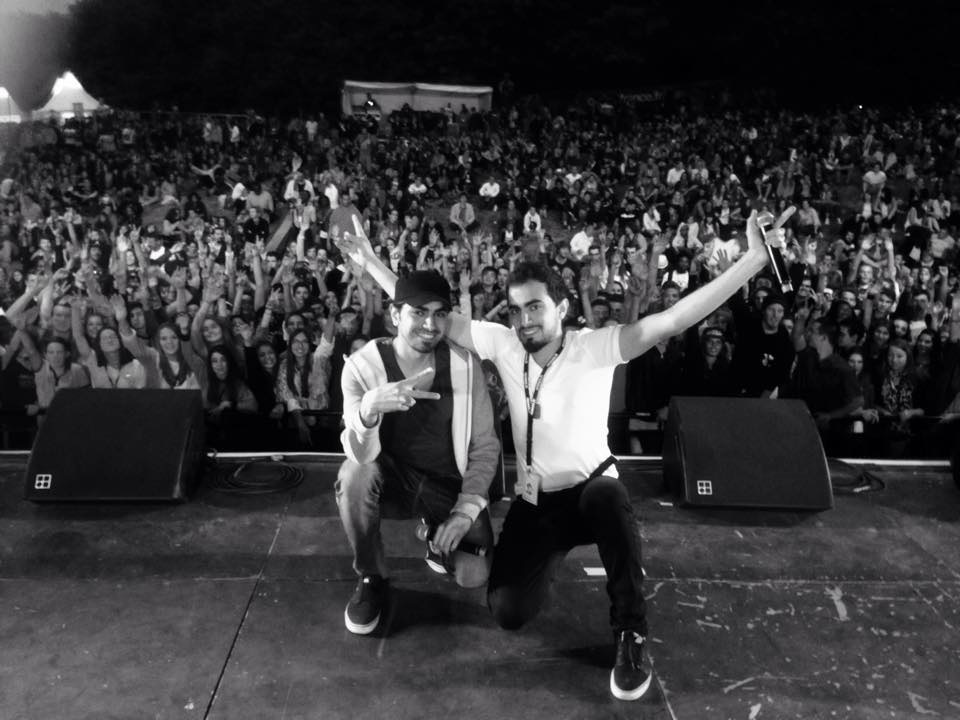
REFUGEES OF RAP Concert Rennes

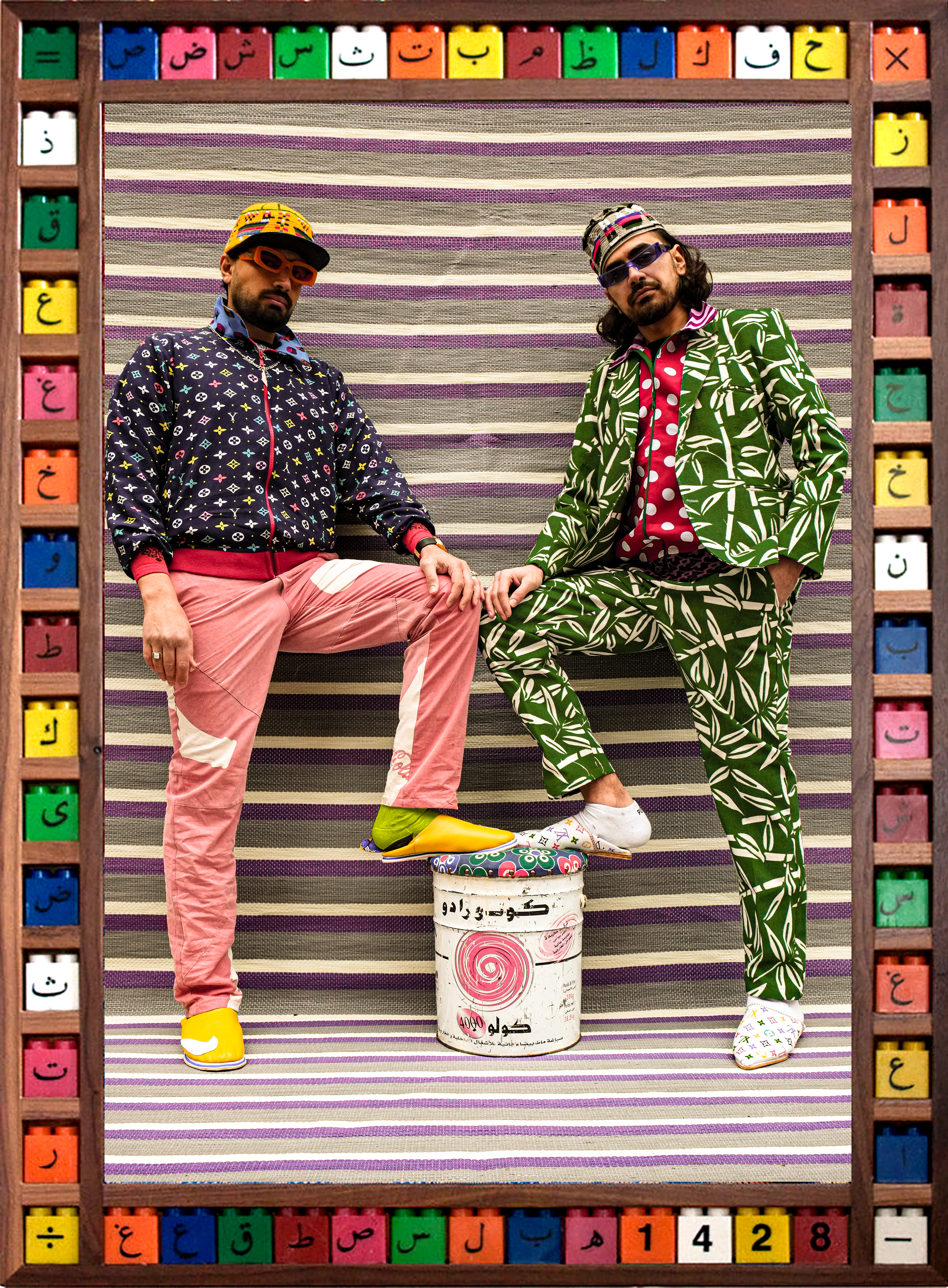

During their career, Refugees Of Rap has attracted the interest of several media such as (Rolling Stone magazine, The World, The Guardian, BBC, ARTE, Vice, Konbini, Radio France, TV5 ... etc)

Refugees of Rap also organized a “rap writing” workshop.

== Discography ==
Albums

- Face 2 Face (2010)
- The Age of Silence (2014)
- Insomnia (2018)
