= Palestinian hip-hop =

Music genre

Palestinian hip-hop reportedly started in 1998 with Tamer Nafar's group DAM. These Palestinian youth forged the new Palestinian musical subgenre, which blends Arabic melodies and hip hop beats. Lyrics are often sung in Arabic, Hebrew, English, and sometimes French. Since then, the new Palestinian musical subgenre has grown to include artists in Palestine, Israel, Great Britain, the United States and Canada.

Borrowing from traditional rap music that first emerged in New York in the 1970s, "young Palestinian musicians have tailored the style to express their own grievances with the social and political climate in which they live and work." Palestinian hip hop works to challenge stereotypes and instigate dialogue about the Israeli–Palestinian conflict. Palestinian hip hop artists have been strongly influenced by the messages of American rappers. Tamar Nafar says “when I heard Tupac sing “It’s a White Man’s World” I decided to take hip hop seriously”. In addition to the influences from American hip hop, it also includes musical elements from Palestinian and Arabic music including “zajal, mawwal, and saj” which can be likened to Arabic spoken word, as well as including the percussiveness and lyricism of Arabic music.

Historically, music has served as an integral accompaniment to various social and religious rituals and ceremonies in Palestinian society (Al-Taee 47). Much of the Middle-Eastern and Arabic string instruments utilized in classical Palestinian music are sampled over Hip-hop beats in both Israeli and Palestinian hip-hop as part of a joint process of localization. Just as the percussiveness of the Hebrew language is emphasized in Israeli Hip-hop, Palestinian music has always revolved around the rhythmic specificity and smooth melodic tone of Arabic. "Musically speaking, Palestinian songs are usually pure melody performed monophonically with complex vocal ornamentations and strong percussive rhythm beats". The presence of a hand-drum in classical Palestinian music indicates a cultural esthetic conducive to the vocal, verbal and instrumental percussion which serve as the foundational elements of Hip-hop. This hip hop is joining a “longer tradition of revolutionary, underground, Arabic music and political songs that have supported Palestinian Resistance”. This subgenre has served as a way to politicize the Palestinian issue through music.

== Themes ==
Many Palestinian hip hop artists address themes that directly affect Palestinians in the occupied territories, living in Israel and those in exile. These artists use hip hop to address issues including patriarchy, drugs, violence, corruption and police brutality. Unlike the ideals of American rap, Palestinian rappers focus on exposing the lived conditions of the Palestinian people, especially the denial of Palestinian self-determination in their homeland. Palestinian nationalism is at the center of all Palestinian hip hop, regardless of the artists. The current living conditions of Palestinians living in the occupied Palestine and within Israel is addressed in the songs "Who is the Terrorist" by DAM and "Free Palestine" by the Hammer Brothers. Rather than succumbing to the violence that surrounds them, Palestinian hip hop artists instead, attempt to spread their politically conscious messages to the world.

=== Israeli–Palestinian Conflict ===
Palestinian rappers have been explicit in their criticism of the current situation between Israel and Palestine. The song "Who is the Terrorist" by DAM is arguably the most explicit criticism of the relationship between Israel and Palestine. These rappers want to address the "paradox inherent in the notion of a state that claims to be both democratic and Jewish". The book, Representing Islam: Hip-Hop of the September 11 Generation, states that "the Palestinian struggle for self-determination has become a major rallying cry for Muslim hip-hoppers. Many established or up-and-coming Muslim hip-hopper either have a song about Palestine or make references to the politics of dispossession in the third holiest land in Islam". MC Abdul, a young rapper who has been raised in the conflict, focuses much of his work on the Israeli–Palestinian Conflict.

=== Living conditions ===
All Palestinian artists, regardless if they are within Palestine or abroad, have addressed their lived experience as Palestinians. For rapper Mahmoud who lives in Israel, he describes his experience as "whenever I walk the streets, my enemy steps to me in ignorance, he demands my ID, sees I’m an Arab. It drives him crazy. He begins to interrogate me, tells me I’m a suspected terrorist". Similarly, in the song, "Who Is The Terrorist", DAM describes the physical conditions, rapping: "Crawling on the ground, smelling the rotting bodies? Demolished homes, lost families, orphans, freedoms with handcuffs?". The Palestinian female rap duo from Acre, Israel, Arapeyat, address challenges among the Palestinian community by rapping "what’s happening to our society, we’re imprisoning ourselves, with crimes and drugs, we need to make change now".

=== Establishment of an independent state ===
Palestinian rappers have addressed the need and right to establish an independent Palestinian state in the Palestinian territories. For these rappers, "Palestinian liberation is obviously a key touchstone topic of identity...their music deals not just with issues of cultural identity but also of global politics".

=== Palestinian unity and pride ===
For many Palestinian rappers, especially those in exile, their aim is to raise consciousness. In their song "Prisoner," DAM raps, "our future is in our hands, there is still good in the world my brothers, the sky is wide open, take flight my brothers". The song "Born Here" delivers a similar message by saying "when we said hand in hand we should stand, we didn’t mean just a finger, cuz in order to achieve power we shall all be together". Despite location or overall theme, Palestinian rappers all support and wish to give hope to Palestinians. In his song "Sarah," Emirati-Born Palestinian rapper Ortega (Alhasan) who released a promotional track with Palestinian singer Rim Banna.

== Palestinian hip hop artists ==
Palestinian hip hop is not limited to the Palestinian Territories. Rappers and hip hop groups that consider themselves Palestinian hip hop artists have emerged around the world. These "Arab and Palestinian American hip hop artists are part of a transnational hip hop movement that includes young artists in Palestine/Israel". In Gaza, Ortega (Alhasan) who released many albums he lives in United Arab Emirates, MC Gaza (Ibrahim Ghunaim), Palestinian Rapperz and MWR rap about positive expression, everyday struggles, and the conditions of living in the occupied territories. Similarly, rappers Arapyat, Saz and The Happiness Kids discuss the experience of Palestinian youth in the West Bank. In Israel, DAM rap the experience of the Arabs who live in Israel. Internationally, Palestinian American rappers Excentrik, the Philistines, Iron Sheik, Ragtop and the Hammer Brothers all touch on themes of alleged racial profiling and discrimination against Arabs in the United States while expressing solidarity with Palestinians in the Palestinian Territories and in the diaspora. Refugees Of Rap Palestinian hip-hop group. Based in Paris, France, it Was in 2007, in a Palestinian refugee camp in Yarmouk, Syria, that the brothers, Yaser and Mohamed Jamous, created this group. Their texts offer a glimpse of life in the camp and denounce the situation in Syria . Shadia Mansour, a British-born female rapper, has brought attention to Palestinian hip hop in Europe along with others, Ettijah, a female rap group from Dheisheh Refugee Camp who are the first Palestinian female refugee rappers

=== Prominent names ===
- Belly - a Palestinian-Canadian rapper, singer, songwriter, and record producer.
- DAM - a Palestinian hip-hop group founded in 1999 by brothers Tamer and Suhell Nafar and their friend Mahmoud Jreri.
- Shabjdeed - a Palestinian rapper from Kafr 'Aqab.
- MC Abdul - a Palestinian rapper from Gaza.
- Saint Levant - a Palestinian singer-songwriter and rapper.
- Shadia Mansour - a British-Palestinian rapper who performs in Arabic and English
- Sameh Zakout - a Palestinian rapper from Ramla.

== Media ==
American filmmaker Jackie Salloum's 2008 feature-length documentary Slingshot Hip Hop traces the history and development of Palestinian hip hop in Israel, the West Bank and Gaza Strip from the time DAM pioneered the art form in the late 1990s. DAM, Palestinian Rapperz, Mahmoud Shalabi, and female artists Arapeyat and Abeer Zinaty are all featured in the documentary. The film was screened at the 2008 Sundance Film Festival.

== See also ==
- Arabic hip hop
- Israeli hip hop
