= IHDA =

IHDA may refer to:

- Illinois Housing Development Authority, a government agency of Illinois responsible for housing assistance
- Intel High Definition Audio, a specification for the audio sub-system of personal computers

== See also ==
- Ihda', the debut album by DAM
