= Ihda' =

Studio album by DAM
- Released: 2006
- Genre: Arabic hip hop
- Label: Red Circle Music

Professional ratings
Review scores
Source	Rating
Arabic Hip Hop Headz	link

Ihda' (Arabic: إهداء, lit. 'Dedication') is the debut album by DAM released in November 2006 by British record label Red Circle Music - RCM. It is DAM's debut album and the first Palestinian hip hop album. The album was licensed to EMI Arabia to distribute it in the Middle East except for Palestine where it was distributed independently. The album contains 15 tracks, the cover of the album was taken by the Palestinian photographer Steve Sabella.

== Background ==
Mukadime samples Egyptian leader Gamal Abdel Nasser in an effort to build a bridge between the old generation and the new generation. The song is a recording of Nasser talking about a new day and a new generation that will make that difference over a beat

DAM were invited by Juliano Mer Khamis to his house to watch his documentary "Arna's Children" and were so moved by the film that they decided to dedicate "Mali Huriye" to the film, they picked the melody that the kids and the locals are singing in a theatre day in the Jenin camp, they fell in love with the line "Why are all the children of the world free but not us?", which they used as the song's hook. Since the hook ends with a question, they provide an answer at the end of the song in the form of a quotation from famed Syrian poet Nizar al-Qabbani's poem "We Need a New Generation", spoken by 10-year-old Anat Egbareye.

The song has been used in the following films and TV shows: Where in the World Is Osama bin Laden? (2008), an American documentary by Morgan Spurlock, director of Supersize me Forgiveness (2007), by the American/Israeli director Udi Aloni Check Point Rocks (2009) Fermin Muguruza and Javier Corcuera Arab Labor, the hit TV show by Sayed Kashua

"Ng'ayer Bukra" is a sequel to the preceding song. The hook, sung by kids from the Arabic ghettos of Lyd, goes "We want education, we want progress, to find the strength so we change tomorrow." The song also features a sample from old children's show Iftah Ya Simsim (Arab Sesame Street). The song made a big buzz when it was used in Palestinian writer Sayed Kashua's successful TV show Avoda Aravit (Arab Labor). "Wardeh" is a slang used in Lyd, meaning "brother, dude, my man, etc." The song is a boast about who is the best on the mic. "Inkilab" is a Suhell Nafar solo and the first Palestinian reggae song. "Ya Sayedati" is the first single of the album, released Valentine's Day 2006. Its music video, directed by Marwan Asaad, was the first from the album.

Tamer's first solo in the album, "Al Huriye Unt'a", protests against the oppression of women. In their shows DAM present the song by saying "How can we beat the occupation with one hand? We need the other one, so let's stop choking our sisters and instead use the hand to fight." The song features Safaa Hathut, the first Palestinian female rapper from Arapeyat Acka. "Da Dam" represents DAM, explaining who they are and what their message is. It samples a very popular Egyptian play "Madraset al Mushag'ibin – The school of hooligans" with Adel Imam, Said Saleh, Ahmad Zaki and Younes Shalabi. In one of their interviews, DAM explained how hard it was to clear the sample since there was no official organization to request it from. While they were in Berlin Film Festival to participate in the opening of Udi Aloni's film "Forgiveness – Mehilot" that they played a role in, they met with the Egyptian actor Nour El-Sherif and spoke to him about the problem of the sample, he put them in contact with Said Saleh who signed the clearance and faxed it to DAM without any payment.

Speaking about "Love us buy us", the band said: "We made a catchy chorus without any meaning just so you can play it in the Radio". One of DAM's funniest song as they mock the meaningless songs that are taking over the radios. In a lecture DAM gave at the University of Rome, Italy about Palestinian hip hop as a form of resistance, they explained that they love pop music but do not like the fact that it is the only thing played on the radio. As such, they say even if the media was playing only protest songs they will sing "We made a protest song just so you can play us".

Another funny song, Mes Endroits, is a sarcastic view of ghettos. DAM explained that in the beginning they used to rap about their ghetto, when they succeeded in Palestine they found out that the world is bigger than their hood and when they started touring around the world they discovered that the world is bigger than Palestine. DAM explains that if the Israeli Police are working with the Atlanta Police to oppress minorities, then the minorities should work together and fight the oppressors. This is why they chose to work with French rapper Nikkfurie of La Caution, as DAM will talk about their ghetto in Israel and he will talk about his ghetto in France.

Tamer's second solo in the album, "Usset Hub", is a love story, and the title was originally a placeholder name that was kept because time constraints prevented them from choosing another title. In one of DAM's performances, they started the song by reading a quote from the Egyptian writer Nawal El Saadawi where she explains how love is treated by the Arab society, the lovers are like 2 beautiful flowers and society is like the bees, they suck the honey and the sweetness of it. The song features Palestinian actress Rawda Suleiman in the role of the girl and the mother and the singer/actor Ibahim Sakalla as Tamer's friend in the song.

Starting the song with the voice of the late Tawfiq Ziad, DAM went to visit his family before they released "G'areeb fi Bladi" and they got a clearance to use his voice and words. The song continues with verses that explains to the Arab world the catch 22 that faces Palestinians who live in Israel, seen in lyrics like "The Arab world treats us as Israelis and Israel treats us as Palestinians, I am a stranger in my own country." In the third verse, Tamer raps the names of the 13 Palestinian civilians killed by Israeli forces in October 2000 demonstrations as a form of wordplay, using their names as verbs. Tamer explained in an interview that "it took him more than a month to deliver the political message using specific names as verbs and only in 16 bars and not more, it was challenging but worth it, sometimes after a show someone surprises me and tells me I am the sister of one of the martyrs, or the mother, and they come to talk to me after hearing his name in the song, it is sad but it moves me"

Mahmood's solo in the album, Kalimat, raps about the important role of the lyrics/words and speeches during the history of the world. The chorus is samples from DAM's old songs. Originally the song was recorded over the Fairuz sample "Habbaytak Bissayf" but after having problems with the clearance they recomposed it.

Hany Abu-Assad, director of the film Paradise Now, which won a Golden Globe for Best Foreign Language Film and was nominated for an Academy Award in the same category, said about using "Sawa' al Zaman": "I just finished editing my documentary Ford Transit (2002) and I had in one of my scenes a song by Dr. Dre – Big Egos, after meeting DAM they offered me replace the song, if the scenes were about Palestine then it should be backed by Palestinian Hip Hop and DAM were the right people for that, they were limited by the creation of the song since the scene is already edited, so they took Dr. Dre song as a reference and came out with something the fits perfect and new, me and my staff watched the scene with the both songs and we all voted for the new DAM song, Driver of Fate, which lyrically goes with the film, but not one on one, more metaphorically"

== Reception ==
A review from the Arabic Hip Hop Heads website states that "The final track is a bittersweet personal Dedication (Ihda’) to all those who supported DAM - a good song indeed." The song features Ibrahim Sakalla and is composed by Ori Shochat.

== Track listing ==
1. "Mukadime (Intro)"
2. "Mali Huriye (I Don't Have Freedom)" ft. Alaa Azam and Anat Egbariye
3. "Ng'ayer Bukra (Change Tomorrow)"
4. "Warde (Flower)" ft. SAZ
5. "Inkilab (Revolution)"
6. "Ya Sayidati (My Lady)" ft. Suhell Fodi from Zaman
7. "Al Huriye Unt'a (Freedom for My Sisters)" ft. Safa' Hathut from Arapeyat
8. "Hibuna Ishtruna (Love Us and Buy Us)"
9. "Mes Endroits (My Hood)" ft. Nikkfurie from La Caution
10. "Usset Hub (A Love Story)" ft. Rawda Suleiman and Ibrahim Sakalla
11. "G'areeb Fi Bladi (Stranger in My Own Country)" ft. Amal Bisharat
12. "Kalimat (Words)"
13. "Sawa' al Zaman (Driver of Fate)"
14. "Ihda' (Dedication)" ft. Ibrahim Sakalla

== Personnel ==
- Ran Harush – producer mixer
- Ori Shochat – producer
- Tam Cooper – mixer
- Arye Avtan – producer
- Alaa' Azzam – oud
- Mahran Mer'eb – Kanoun
- Alaa' Azzam and Suhell Fodi – vocals; from Zaman and a former member of Wala'at
- Anat Egbareye – vocals
- Abir al Azinati – lyrics for "G'areeb fi Bladi"

== Awards ==
- Album of the week in Germany, Berlin at 2006.
- Best Palestinian art work for Al Qattan Organization on 2008.
- Best Palestinian Rap album at the Palestinian Manassa music awards 2011.
