= DAM (band) =

Palestinian hip-hop group

DAM دام
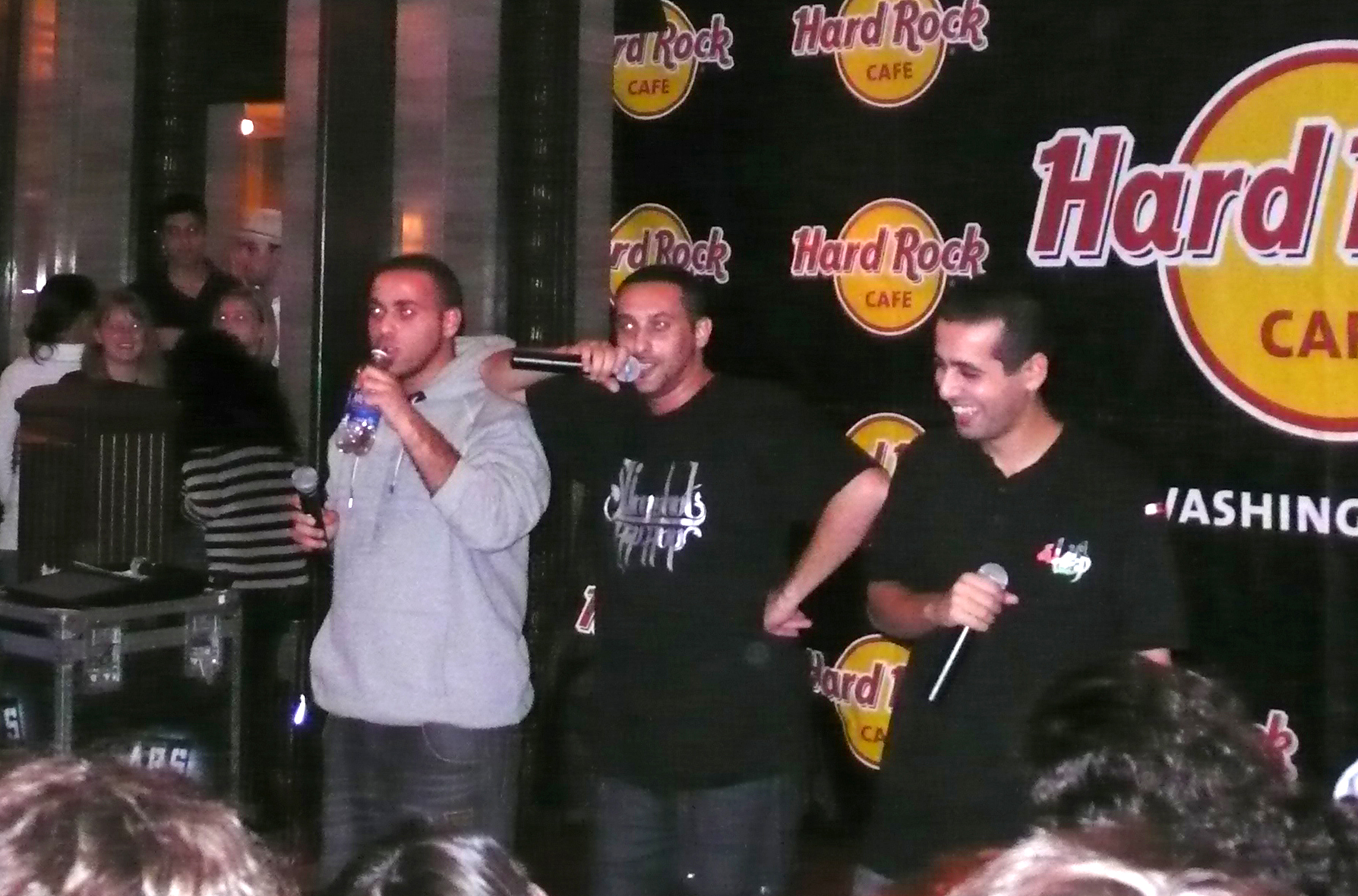
- DAM in Washington, DC, in 2008

Background information
- Origin: Lod, Israel
- Genre: Arabic hip hop
- Years active: 1999–present
- Label: Cooking Vinyl
- Members: Tamer Nafar; Suhell Nafar; Mahmoud Jreri; Maysa Daw
- Website: https://www.damofficialband.com/

DAM (Arabic: دام) is a Palestinian hip-hop group founded in 1999 by brothers Tamer and Suhell Nafar and their friend Mahmoud Jreri from the mixed city of Lod. In 2015 female singer Maysa Daw joined the group. The group's songs are themed on protest, inequality, Israeli–Palestinian conflict, and self-criticism of Arab-Israeli society, including the violence and drug dealing within Israel's mixed cities. DAM is the best-known and most famous Palestinian hip hop group; it is also often called the "quintessential Palestinian resistance band".

DAM raps primarily in Arabic, but also in English and Hebrew. DAM has released more than 100 singles and three albums—Dedication, Dabke on the Moon and Ben Haana Wa Maana—as well as an EP—Street Poetry. DAM's music is focused on Palestinian identity, culture, and resistance, and the group has frequently used their music and profile to raise awareness of the Palestinian cause, often performing their music in collaboration with activist groups. The name DAM is an acronym for "Da Arab MCs" that also means "enduring" or "everlasting" in Arabic or "blood" in Arabic and Hebrew.

In January 2017, they signed with the London-based independent record label publishing and services, Cooking Vinyl.

== Name ==
The name DAM is an acronym for "Da Arab MCs" that also means "enduring" or "everlasting" in Arabic (دام; dām) or "blood" in Arabic and Hebrew (دم; dam).

== History ==
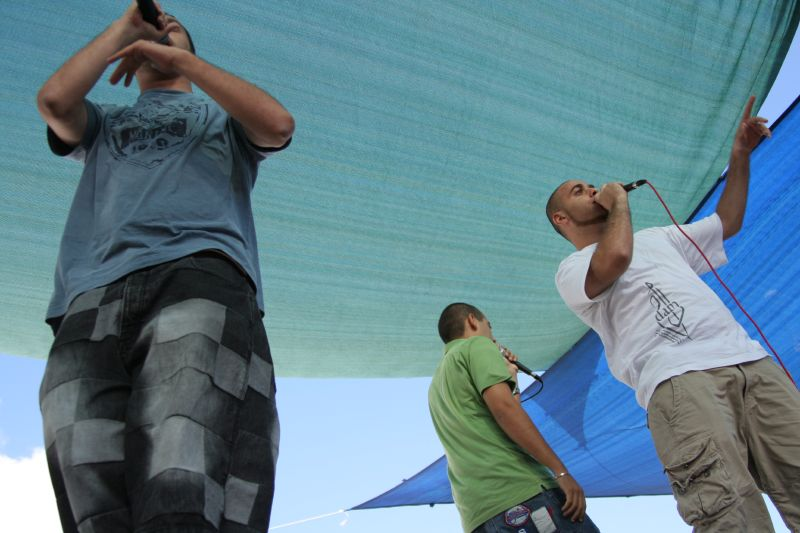
DAM rap trio performing at the 2007 Taybeh beer festival.

=== 1998–2000: Early development ===
DAM founders Tamer Nafar, Suhell Nafar and Mahmoud Jreri were born and raised in high-density, impoverished neighborhoods in Lod, the living conditions of which they have subsequently called those of "second-class citizens" in their music. After listening to 1990s Algerian rap groups such as Micro Brise le Silence (MBS), the Nafar brothers became convinced to abandon English lyrics in favour of Arabic. Tupac Amaru Shakur's songs has also been noted as an emblematic figure in rap that helped inspire DAM. DAM leader Tamer Nafar began his career in 1998 in the Jewish–Israeli rap scene under the wing of the Tunisian–Iranian-origin Israeli rap artist Subliminal. In 1998, Tamer released his first EP, "Stop Selling Drugs," featuring his younger brother, Suhell Nafar. Nafar then formed DAM in 1999 with his brother Suhell and their friend Muhammad Jrere, but as late as 2000 the group continues to perform in concert with Subliminal and other Jewish–Israeli rappers.

DAM was created in order to give a voice, and a platform to express widespread disillusionment and discontent felt by the Palestinian youth facing discrimination and oppression from Israel. The trio having experienced adolescence in this context, used hip hops as a means of communicating their sentiments towards their difficult situations as Palestinians. In their early days, the group had limited access to recording studios and necessary equipment, and experienced censorship, surveillance and persecution by Israeli authorities.

They later went on to perform in the West Bank, where they sampled "famed protest poetry and traditional song material" and brought it into their rap. The film Slingshot Hip Hop features DAM's three founders as protagonists as it traces the rise of DAM and other Palestinian hip hop groups. Though DAM is sometimes mistakenly identified as the first Palestinian hip hop or rap group, they were preceded by a band named "MWR", a group from Acre that has since disbanded.

DAM started recording songs on their home computer, and most of their songs back then were recorded over known hip hop instrumentals. At the time, the hip-hop scene in Palestine was developing largely, and DAM in particular, got their start performing in Jerusalem. As a result, most of their earlier music was performed in Arabic. At the beginning of the group's history, DAM's music and lyrics focused mostly around everyday life, performing, and emotions, not containing many political references. But this changed with time. On September 3, 2000, Tamer's friend Booba (Hussam Abu Gazazae) was shot down and killed during a drive-by, an incident that drove Tamer to record his first protest song with a political reference. A cover of Abd al Majeed Abdalla's song "Ya Tayeb al Galb", the song was called "Booba" and featured Ibraheem Sakallah in the hook.

=== 2000–2005: Second Intifada period ===
With the onset of the Second Intifada in October 2000, DAM and Subliminal stopped touring together due to their opposing political opinions. That same year, DAM wrote their first direct political song, "Posheem Hapim me Peshaa' – Innocent Criminals." It was recorded over an instrumental of "Hail Mary" by Tupac, and featured inciting lines such as "When Jews protest, the cops use clubs / When Arabs protest, the cops takes their souls" and "If it is a democracy, how come I'm not mentioned in your anthem" followed by the chorus "Before you judge me, before you understand me, walk in my shoes, and you will hurt your feet, because we are criminal, innocent criminals." The song created controversy in the Israeli media, and it put DAM in conflict with some Israeli rappers, such as Subliminal, with much of the subsequent fall-out being recorded in the documentary Channels of Rage. Despite the controversy, the song was later remixed by the Israeli rock musician Aviv Geffen, with American-Israeli director Udi Aloni making a music video for the song in 2003.

Around that time, and after listening to a CD from the Algerian hip hop group MBS, Tamer got convinced to give it a shot in Arabic; after a few experiences, he released his first official single "Min al Ta lal Alef lal M E R – From the T to the A to the M E R" over the R. Kelly's instrumental feat Nas "Have you ever thought" the song hit number one charts in all of the Arab radios.

==== "Min Erhabi? – Who's the terrorist?" (2001) ====
In 2001, DAM released their breakthrough single "Who is the terrorist?" (مين ارهابي, Min Erhabi?), which was soon downloaded more than a million times.

The song features politically charged lyrics in which DAM critiques the "racist, essentialist notion" of "the Palestinian terrorist":

Who's a terrorist? I'm a terrorist?
How am I a terrorist while I live in my country?
Who's a terrorist? You're a terrorist!
You've taken everything I own while I'm living in my homeland.

The lyrics offended some Israelis, prompting demonstrations at concerts, including one attended by the then Israeli Culture Minister Miri Regev, a former military censor, who called the song "an act of violence".

The song generated an international buzz around DAM, with Rolling Stone France featuring the song and releasing a compilation alongside the magazine featured DAM's Min Erhabi and other International artists such as Manu Chao and Zebda. At that same time, Udi Aloni released his second documentary "Local Angel" that also featured DAM and they toured around Europe with the film.

Min Erhabi remains both one of DAM's most popular and controversial songs, giving voice as it does to the perpetual circle of violence within the Israeli–Palestinian conflict.

The pro-peace song "Summit Meeting" was also released in 2001 by Sagol 59, DAM's Tamer Nafar, and Sha’anan Street, the front man for Israeli rappers Hadag Nahash. Recorded amid spiraling violence, it was the first example of a Jewish-Arab hip-hop collaboration performed in both Hebrew and Arabic.

==== 2003–2004 ====
In 2003 Anat Halachmi, an Israeli film director, released the documentary Channels of Rage. The film follows Tamer Nafar and DAM on one side and Subliminal on the other. Anat followed them for almost 3 years. The film shows their relations and beefs through Hip Hop; the film won the Volgin Award for the best documentary in the Jerusalem film festival 2003. In 2004 the group was invited by the Shateel organization to do a song that talks about discrimination in Israel, the Palestinian neighborhoods suffering from poverty, unemployment, and house demolitions by Israel.

In the song "Kan Noladti – Born Here", the group featured the female Palestinian rapper Abir al Zinati, shown walking the streets of Lod. The song was created as a reference to a known Israeli song by "Dats and Datsa" that said, "I was born here, my children were born here, and this is where we built our houses with our hands", DAM changed it to "I was born here, my grandparents were born here, and this is where you destroyed our houses with your hands". The Born Here Campaign also featured a bus tour in the Palestinian neighborhoods for Israel's top celebrities. The campaign created a huge local media outrage. Many artists joined the ride, among which were: Moni Moshonov, Aviv Geffen, Ha Yehudim, Yoav Kutner, Gila Almagor.

"When we say Hip Hop is a bridge, we mean it metaphorically and Literary," said Tamer in his TEDEX speech in 2012 in Nazareth. Tamer maintained to make political and historical tours after that, for schools, local and foreign groups, and for international artists such as Erykah Badu, Ezra Koenig from the American rock band - Vampire's Weekend, Michael Franti, Gbenga Akinnagbe actor on the TV show The Wire. The Born Here Campaign with DAM also toured Israel to spread awareness for the campaign.

=== 2006–2010 ===
DAM released their first album, "Ihda'" or "Dedication", in 2006. DAM signed with the British label RCM – Red Circle Music to market the album in Europe and gave the licensing to EMI Arabia to distribute the album in the Arab countries, they also signed with the French booking agency 3D Family to tour the Sundance Film Festival, Womad, Dubai International Film Festival, among others, as well as the local Taybeh Beer Festival in Taybeh, State of Palestine.

In 2008, the American filmmaker Jackie Salloum released the documentary Slingshot Hip Hop about the story of Palestinian Hip Hop within Israel and the occupied Palestinian territories. The film was screened at the 2008 Sundance Film Festival and prominently features DAM, alongside other Palestinian artists, inclyuding Abeer Zinaty (aka Sabreena da Witch, also from Lod), the Gaza-based Palestinian Rapperz, Arapeyat and Mahmoud Shalabi, both from Acre.

The soundtrack was mostly recorded at Sabreen Studio, East Jerusalem; the album had songs such "Who is the terrorist" by DAM, "Tzakar" by PR, "Blinded Freedom" by Shalabi, "The witch's Uprising" by Abeer and Suhell Nafar and “Sot el Samt” by WE7.

In 2009, when Israel started to advertise for Israel's Palestinian citizens to serve in the National Service instead of the Army, the campaign was opposed by Palestinian organizations and activists, including the Baladna organization, which asked DAM to write and record a theme song for the campaign.

In 2010, DAM were asked by Adala to participate in the short film that describes the Israeli legal discrimination towards Palestinians, DAM was offered to meet with Adala's lawyers, ask questions and regarding the answer, they will go to the studio followed by the camera and record a song about it. DAM came out with the song "Muwaten Mustahdaf – Targeted Citizen", the directors liked the title of the song, so they ended up using it for the title of the film and the campaign.

In 2010, Tamer Nafar fronted the international music event "Lyrical Alliance" in the UK, which drew together artists from North Africa, the Middle East in what was subsequently called "The dream team of Arabic hip hop".

=== 2011–present ===
After 5 years of performing and touring, and participating in other Artists' projects, DAM decided to release the first single from their future album "Nudbok Al Amar – Dabka on the Moon". The name of the first single is "Risale min Zinzane - A Letter from the Cell", they featured in the song Trio Joubran and Bachar Marcell Khalifa. During the writing process of the song, DAM met with the Addameer organization a few times to collect information, personal stories, and letters so they can create three fictional characters that will be based on true stories.

== Musical style and impact ==
DAM's musical style merges Western hip hop with traditional Palestinian musical influences, creating a distinct music genre that reflects their political message and identity. Rapping in both English and Arabic and even Hebrew, this fusion is further seen in their lyrics, which describe their experiences as Palestinians under occupation, their aspirations for social justice and human rights as well as their critiques of the society they live in.

While DAM was characterized early on as "young, angry, hardcore Palestinian Israeli youth straight out of Lyd's ghetto", they later took a different direction, "speaking to issues of racism and reconciliation with Israel", voiced in song lyrics such as:

Where is the equality when I live in a shack? ... When I am not mentioned in the national anthem

By 2012, DAM is said to have grown tired of their identification as a "resistance band", with its members instead seeking identities as mainstream commercial artists wanting to "move beyond the political hype" and "be known for their beats and verses".

There has been almost no analysis of DAM's Hebrew songs or its position in Israeli society and culture, but the simplistic outline of a resistance narrative does not adequately reflect DAM's nuanced political and cultural stances and the multiple audiences it addresses.

== Reception ==
Because of the stance DAM has taken, the group has faced political pressure and censorship from Israeli authorities, who view their music as a threat to Israeli legitimacy. As a result, the rap group experienced difficulties in organising events and performances, Israeli authorities actively wanting to shut down these events over basis of inciting hate and unrest towards the Israeli state.

They have also faced backlash for their song "Mama I fell in love with a Jew", with a parodic music video where the rap group is in an elevator with an IDF soldier.

Their drawing on themes such as Arab violence and drug dealing have also drawn criticism from within the Arab community, which tends to avoid airing these problems in public.

== Discography ==
Albums

- Ihda' (2006)
- Dabke on the Moon (2012)
- Ben Haana Wa Maana (2019)

Together, these albums have earned DAM critical acclaim and helped make of this group a leading voice in Palestinian artistic resistance movements.

Contributing artist

- The Rough Guide To Arabic Revolution (2013)

== DAM in TV and cinema ==
- (2002) Local angel (as DAM)
- (2003) Channels of Rage by Anat Halachmi (as DAM)
- (2007) Forgiveness (as DAM)
- (2007) DAM – UK London by Eliot Manches (as DAM)
- (2008) Slingshot Hip Hop by Jackie Salloum (as DAM and Suhell Nafar as the narrator)
- (2008) Salt of the sea by Annemarie Jacir (DAM's Song Shidu al Himme produced by K Salaam, and a Small part by Tamer Nafar as a waiter)
- (2008) Where in the world is Osama Ben Laden? By Morgan Spurlock (In the soundtrack – Mali Huriye – I have no freedom song)
- (2009) Checkpoint Rock – Songs for Palestine by Fermin Muguruza and Javier Corcuera (as DAM and Suhell Nafar as the narrator)
- (2010) Targeted citizen by Rahel Lea Jones (as DAM)
- (2011) Habibi Rasak Kharban by Susan Youssef (Tamer & Suhell Nafar in a small part as fishermen)
- (2012) I'lam Media Center: I have the right! By Firas Khoury (Tamer Nafar as himself)
- (2012) Yala on the Moon (Yala al Amar) by Jackie Salloum and Suhell Nafar (DAM in the soundtrack and Tamer Nafar in a small part as a driver)
- (2012) Art/Violence, a documentary by Udi Aloni, Cinema Fairbindet Prize awarded in the Berlinale film festival 2012, DAM were part of the characters in the movie and their music video "If I Could Go Back in TIme-Law Arjaa bil Zaman" was used in the movie, as well Tamer Nafar was part of the Producers of the movie.
- (2012) Insha'Allah a Canadian/French feature film directed by Anaïs Barbeau-Lavalette, the movie uses in one of the scenes 2 songs "Love us and Buy us - Hibuna Ishtruna ( from Ihdaa/Dedication) and the single "Targeted Citizen - Muwaten Mustahdaf"

== Live performances and collaborations ==
Many of DAM's live performances in Palestine and around the world have been in collaboration with other activist groups and artists in support of Palestinian resistance and culture. They are furthermore associated to other activist groups, advocating for the safety of Palestinian refugees and political prisoners.
