= Melinda Ademi =

Kosovar-American singer (born 1995)

- Born: 19 November 1995 (age 30); Mitrovica, FR Yugoslavia
- Citizenship: Kosovo; United States
- Occupations: Rapper; singer; songwriter
- Years active: 2015–present
- Musical career
- Genres: Hip hop, pop, R&B
- Instrument: Vocals

Melinda Ademi (Albanian: [mɛˈlinda aˈdɛmi]; born 19 November 1995), also known mononymously as Melinda, is a Kosovar-American rapper and singer who predominantly raps and sings in Albanian.

== Early life ==
Melinda Ademi was born on 19 November 1995 into an Albanian family in the city of Mitrovica, at the time part of the Federal Republic of Yugoslavia. Her family left Kosovo and moved to the United States to Yonkers, New York as refugees due to the persecution of Albanians associated with the disintegration of Yugoslavia and the following Kosovo War.

== Career ==
In 2011, she began her career on the talent show American Idol. She returned to the same contest two years later, reaching the semifinals. In 2015, she released her first single "Purr" and the further release of "Lulija" in 2018 gained her recognition in the Albanian-speaking world.

== Discography ==
=== Singles ===
- 2015 : Purr
- 2018 : Lulija (feat. Seven)
- 2018 : Palo
- 2019 : AMI
- 2019: Çifteli
- 2019 : Pika Pika
- 2019 : A po don pak
- 2019 : Karma
- 2020 : 24 BRAS
- 2020 : Nashta
- 2020 : X5 (feat. Gjiko)
- 2020 : MEKETARE
- 2021 : Qa din ti
- 2021: Ay Caramba (feat. Nora Istrefi & Gjiko)
- 2021 : Melodia
- 2022 : All Night
- 2022: A m’ke Dasht (feat. Ledri Vula)
- 2022: Milano (feat. Finem)
- 2022: Flasin
- 2023 : Mere
- 2023: Ferrari (feat. Bardhi)
- 2023: Mafioza (feat. Skerdi)
- 2023: Tornado (feat. Rina)
- 2023: Mos Ma Prish (feat. Bardhi)
- 2024: Alkool (feat. Finem)
- 2024: KISS ME
- 2024: Queen (feat. Meriton)
- 2024: Kjo Verre
- 2025: ECI (feat. Lumi B)
- 2025: DEDIKIM
- 2025: Vaffancullo (feat. Getto Geasy)
- 2025: Romanca (feat. Bardhi)
- 2025: Oj Shpirt
- 2025: Zemra jeme
- 2025: 40 BARS (Freestyle)
- 2026: Cardi B
- 2026: Veç Me ty
- 2026: Heke (feat. Didine Canon 16)
- 2026: “BAD DIVA” [ALBUM]
- 2026: Xhiro (feat. ELINEL)
- 2026: Ça mbone (feat. Ronela Hajati)
- 2026: S’Jena Mo (feat. Bardhi)
- 2026: Okej Okej (feat. Gjesko)
- 2026: LEJ (feat. ELINEL & Muharrem Ahmeti & Muma)

==== As lead artist ====
Title	Year	Peak chart positions	Album
Title	Year	ALB	Album
"Purr"	2015	—	Non-album single
"Lulija" (featuring Seven Saraqi)	2018	—	Non-album single
"Lej"	2018	—	Non-album single
"Palo"	2018	4	Non-album single
"AMI"	2019	44	Non-album single
"Çifteli"	2019	76	Non-album single
"Pika Pika"	2019	1	Non-album single
"A po don pak"	2019	52	Non-album single
"Karma"	2019	3	Non-album single
"24 Bars"	2020	—	Non-album single
"Nashta"	2020	—	Non-album single
"X5" (with Gjiko)	2020	3	Non-album single
"Mekatare"	2020	2	Non-album single
"Qa din ti"	2021	5	Non-album single
"Ay Caramba" (featuring Gjiko and Nora Istrefi)	2021	4	Non-album single
"Melodia"	2021	1	Non-album single
"All Night"	2022	7	Non-album single
"A m'ke dasht" (with Ledri Vula)	2022	10	Non-album single
"Milano" (with Finem)	2022	1	Non-album single
“Flasin”	2022	—	Non-Album single
‘’Mere’’	2023	—	Non-Album single
“ Ferrari” (with Bardhi)	2023	—	Non-Album single
‘’Mafioza” (with Skerdi)	2023	—	Non-Album single
“TORNADO” (with Rina)	2023	—	Non-Album single
“Mos Ma Prish” (with Bardhi)	2023	1	Non-Album single
“Alkool” (with finem)	2024	—	Non-Album single
“KISS ME”	2024	—	Non-Album single
“Queen” (with Meriton)	2024		Non-Album single
“Kjo Verre”	2024		Non-Album single
“ECI” (with Lumi B)	2025	—	BAD DIVA
“DEKIM”	2025	—	Non-Album single
“Romanca” (with Bardhi)	2025	—	Non-Album single
“Oj Shpirt”	2025	—	BAD DIVA
“Zemra Jeme”	2025	—	Non-Album single
“40 BRAS”	2025	—	Non-Album single
“Cardi B”	2026	—	Non-Album single
“Veç Me Ty”	2026	—	BAD DIVA
“HEKE” (with Didine Canon 16)	2026	—	BAD DIVA
“Xhiro” (with ELINEL)	2026	—	BAD DIVA
“Ça m’bone” (With Ronela Hajati)	2026	—	BAD DIVA
“S’jena Mo” (with Bardhi)	2026	—	BAD DIVA
“Okej Okej” (with Gjesko)	2026	—	BAD DIVA
"—" denotes a recording that did not chart or was not released in that territory.
