= Tamer Nafar =

Palestinian rapper (born 1979)

Tamer Nafar تامر نفار
- Born: June 6, 1979 (age 47)
- Origin: Lod, Israel
- Genres: Hip hop, Political hip-hop
- Occupations: Rapper, Actor, Screenwriter, Social Activist
- Years active: 1999–present
- Website: Facebook Page

Tamer Nafar (Arabic: تامر نفار, Hebrew: תאמר נפאר; born June 6, 1979) is a Palestinian rapper, actor, screenwriter and social activist of Israeli citizenship. He is the leader and a founding member of DAM, the first Palestinian hip hop group.

== Early life ==
Nafar was born to Fawzi Nafar and Nadia Awadi. He grew up in Lod, a mixed Arab-Israeli city in Israel plagued by drug smuggling and crime.

Tamer discovered hip-hop at age 17, when he began learning English by listening to Tupac and translating his lyrics to Arabic using an English-Arabic dictionary.

== Career ==
Tamer recorded his first single "Untouchable", a reference to The Untouchables movie.

In 1998, Tamer released his first EP Stop Selling Drugs, featuring his younger brother Suhell.

=== DAM ===
In 2000, their friend Mahmood Jreri joined the Nafar brothers to establish DAM, the first Palestinian hip-hop group.

The trio named themselves Da Arab MCs to create the acronyms DAM, a word that means lasting or persisting in Arabic and blood in Hebrew (דם). In an interview for Democracy Now (2008), Tamer said that the group's name suggested “eternal blood, like we will stay here forever,” evoking a politics of resilience and survival (or دام - sumood, in Arabic).

The group members are the grandchildren of those who experienced the Nakba and the children of those who mobilized the Arab minority in Israel in the 1970s and 1980s. This generation is challenging the insults to Palestinian identity and advocates Palestinian self-determination while objecting to racism and inequality. DAM is notable for their ability to rap in English, Arabic and Hebrew. The group first rapped in English and then in Hebrew as the words flowed better this way. DAM understood that their potential for meaningful social impact depends on their ability to express their message in Arabic, Hebrew and English, drawing upon vernacular phrases, slang, obscenities and indigenous references to each cultural frame. In this way, DAM is able to reach disparate audiences.

On September 3, 2000, Tamer's friend Booba (Hussam Abu Gazazae) was killed during a drive-by shooting, an incident that drove Tamer to record his first protest song with a political reference, despite the fact that his friend had been killed by an Arab. A cover of Abd al Majeed Abdalla's song "Ya Tayeb al Galb", the song was called "Booba" and featured Ibrahim Sakallah on the hook.

In the outbreak of the Second Intifada in October 2000, Tamer and Mahmood decided to write their first direct political song "Posheem Hapim me Peshaa" (Innocent Criminals). It was recorded over an instrumental of "Hail Mary" by Tupac and featured lines such as "when Jews protest, the cops use clubs / when Arabs protest, the cops take their souls" and "if it is a democracy how come I'm not mentioned in your anthem" followed by the chorus "before you judge me, before you understand me, walk in my shoes, and you will hurt your feet, because we are criminals, innocent criminals."

The song created controversy in the Israeli media and put DAM in conflict with some of their fellow Israeli rappers such as Subliminal. Much of the subsequent fall-out was recorded in the documentary Channels of Rage. Despite the controversy, the song was later remixed by Israeli rock musician Aviv Geffen and American-Israeli director Udi Aloni made a music video for the song in 2003.

=== 2003: Channels of Rage ===
In 2003 Israeli film director Anat Halachmi released the documentary Channels of Rage, which won the Wolgin Award for best documentary at the 2003 Jerusalem Film Festival. The film follows Tamer Nafar and DAM on one side and the right-wing Zionist rapper Kobi Shimoni (Subliminal and the Shadow) on the other. Meeting in a dark alley in Tel Aviv, the groups nearly come to blows over recent comments made by Tamer and Shimoni. Once collaborative and cherishing, the relationship quickly dissolved as each began to embody a political ideology following the collapse of the 2000 Camp David Summit and the beginning of the Second Intifada. Coming to terms with the violence on the streets of Tel Aviv and Jenin, both artists retreated from their once close relationship, based on a mutual love of hip-hop, into nationalism.

=== 2004: The Born Here campaign ===
Tamer uses music and art as a tool for activism. In 2004, DAM was invited by the Shateel organization to produce songs discussing discrimination and poverty in mixed Arab-Israeli cities, commenting on Israeli demolition of Palestinian houses and the dangerous entrance into Lod, which required residents to cross eight train tracks to reach the city. DAM collaborated with a local R&B singer and created the song "Born Here" as a reference to a popular Israeli song by the duo Dats and Datsa whose chorus' lyrics begin "I was born here, my children were born here, and this is where I built my house with my two hands". DAM changed this to "I was born here, my grandparents were born here, and this is where you destroyed our houses with your hands". Due to the campaign's success, the Israeli government built a bridge above the train tracks for safer crossing and allowed DAM to tour Israel discussing their cause.

=== 2006: Debut album Ihda ===
After touring the world and releasing number one singles on Arab charts, DAM became the first Palestinian hip hop group to release an album with a major label after signing with EMI Arabia. The album, Ihda', was released in 2006. DAM also signed with the French booking agency 3D Family to tour music festivals around the world promoting the album, visiting the Sundance film festival, Womad, Doha DIFF (Doha International film festival), Dubai Film Festival, Trinity International Hip Hop Festival USA, Vine Rock, Taybeh Beer Festival Palestine, and Casa Festival Morocco, where they shared the stage with internationally known artists including GZA of the Wutang Clan, Mos Def, Talib Kweli, Dead Prez, Chuck D of Public Enemy, Pharaoh Monch, Rachid Taha, Ahmad al Khoury, Immortal Technique, and others. The album included 15 tracks, including some number one hits. Though mainly about the Israeli-Palestinian conflict, the album was also notable for being the first Arab rap album to discuss women's rights. The album's song "Hurriyet Unta" (freedom for my sisters), features Safa' Hathoot, the first female Palestinian rapper, criticizes the oppression of women along with the oppression of the Palestinians.

=== 2008: Slingshot Hip-Hop ===
In 2008 Slingshot Hip Hop – a film about Palestinian Hip Hop by Jackie Salloum was released. Slingshot Hip-Hop is a performative type of documentary that stresses subjective experience and emotional response to the world. It talks about personal stories that might be considered unconventional, although perhaps poetic and experimental. Slingshot Hip Hop braids together the stories of young Palestinians living in Gaza, the West Bank and inside Israel as they discover hip hop and employ it as a tool to surmount divisions imposed by occupation and poverty. Following the debut in the Sundance film festival, the film got a lot of attention and won many prizes, and featured guest appearances by international artists such as Chuck D from Public Enemy and Afrika Bambaataa.

=== 2012: Second album: Dabke on the Moon ===
In 2012, DAM released their second official album, Dabke on the Moon.

The main producer was Tamer and Suhell's cousin, Nabil Nafar, a Danish-Palestinian producer who came to Lod and worked with them on six tracks.

In the track "A letter from the cell", DAM worked with the classical oud players Trio Joubran and Lebanese percussionist Bachar Khalife (the son of legendary composer and oud player Marcel Khalife). The result is a melancholic, non-traditional hip-hop song heavily influenced by classical Arabic composition and instruments.

=== 2013: Room No. 4 ===
In 2013, Tamer Nafar directed the photography campaign Room No. 4 illustrated the reality faced by the children when arrested and detained and is based on the children's testimonies in the report. Room No. 4 is an interrogation room in the Russian Compound–the main Israeli police office in Jerusalem–where Palestinian residents of Jerusalem, including children, are interrogated. to protest child arrests in East Jerusalem. The campaign

=== 2014: "#Who_U_R" ===
In 2014, Tamer Nafar and DAM released the music video "#Who_U_R". The video was directed by Oscar-nominated Palestinian filmmaker Scandar Copti. "#Who_U_R" was written in response to the rape of a 16-year-old Texan teenager Jada, whose assault was recorded, shared, and mocked on social media in 2014.

Tamer stated about the video that, "Women's struggle is beyond the Middle East. It’s an international struggle." He discusses how the concept was to "take the social part of my individual progress and to take my social issues to the international stage."

The song generated a Twitter campaign throughout the Middle East. The hashtag #Who_You_R encouraged men to send in photos of themselves doing housework as a way to break gender norms and support women.

=== 2016: Junction 48 ===
Tamer starred in the feature film Junction 48 directed by Udi Aloni and written by Nafar and Oren Moverman. Nafar's youth and early years as a rapper formed the basis for the semi-autobiographical movie. The film won the Audience Award at the Berlin International Film Festival, Best International Film at the Tribeca Film Festival and 2 awards at the Slovakia Art Film Festival for Best Film and Best Male Actor (Tamer).

As an actor and a writer, Tamer's work has appeared in numerous stage plays in Israel/Palestine and Europe. He has performed alongside veteran Palestinian directors Norman Issa and Nizar Zoabi in Anton Chekhov’s plays.

== Controversial statements ==
Nafar performed at a joint conference between the University of North Carolina and Duke University known as Conflict Over Gaza: People, Politics, and Possibilities. During Nafar's performance he said "I know it might sound [like] R&B stuff, but don't think of Rihanna when you sing it, don't think of Beyoncé. Think of Mel Gibson. Go that anti-Semitic. Let's try it together because I need your help. I cannot be anti-Semitic alone." Gibson is an actor and filmmaker who has said "the Jews are responsible for all the wars in the world."

UNC's Interim Chancellor, Kevin Guskiewicz, condemned the "disturbing" language in Nafar's performance, while members of the audience said that Nafar's comment was a sarcastic remark meant to mock the idea that people fighting for Palestinian liberation must be antisemitic.

== See also ==
- Palestinian hip hop
- Arabic hip hop
