= Checkpoint Rock =

Checkpoint Rock is a 2009 Basque documentary film directed and written by Fermin Muguruza and Javier Corcuera. The film was made with the goal of bringing Palestinian music out of the "darkness".

The film was shot in Tel Aviv's Arab neighborhoods, other cities in Israel, and refugee camps in the West Bank and Gaza Strip.

It received support from the Basque Government, the Association of Independent Basque Audiovisual Producers (Ibaia), and the Spanish Institute of Cinematography and Audiovisual Arts (ICAA).

== Screenings ==
The film premiered in April 2009 at the San Sebastián Human Rights Film Festival.

In early July it was also presented at the Euskal Herria Zuzenean festival.

On August 21 it was shown in Ramallah, West Bank, at the Al-Kasaba theater. It was later shown in Haifa, Acre, and Nazareth.

It was also premiered on September 26 at the San Sebastián Film Festival under the "Zinemira-Basque Cinema Panorama" section.

It will be released in theaters in October.

== Synopsis ==
The documentary not only depicts the situation of several Palestinian musicians but also shows their everyday life. The artists featured in the film include DAM, Amal Murkus, Safaa Arapiyat, Khalas, Walla'at, Muthana Shaban, Suhell, Habib Al-Deek, Ayman PR, Shadi Al-Assi, Sabreen, and Le Trio Joubran. Manu Chao also participated.

== Technical details ==
Directed by	Fermin Muguruza and Javier Corcuera
Written by	Fermin Muguruza and Javier Corcuera
Edited by	Martin Eller
Produced by	K2000 and Filmanova
Distributed by	Barton Films

== See also ==
- Arab music
- Documentaries in the Basque Country
