= Slingshot Hip Hop =

2008 documentary film

- Directed by: Jackie Reem Salloum
- Produced by: Jackie Reem Salloum, Rumzi Araj, Waleed Zaiter
- Starring: DAM, Abeer Alzinaty, PR, WEH Crew, Mahmoud Shalabi, Arapeyat
- Release date: 18 January 2008
- Running time: 80 minutes
- Country: Palestinian territories/Israel
- Languages: Arabic, Hebrew, English

Slingshot Hip Hop is a 2008 documentary film directed by Jackie Reem Salloum that traces the history and development of hip hop in the Palestinian territories from the time DAM pioneered the art form in the late 1990s. It braids together the stories of young Palestinian artists living in Gaza, the West Bank, and inside Israel as they discover hip hop, and employ it as a tool to surmount divisions imposed by occupation and poverty.

== Featured artists ==
Featuring artists;

- DAM (Tamer Nafar, Suhell Nafar and Mahmoud Jreri)
- Palestinian Rapperz (Mohammed Alfarra a.k.a. Prince Alfarra, Motaz Alhwehi a.k.a. Mezo, and Mahmoud Fayad a.k.a. Kan'aan)
- WEH Crew (Alaa Bishara, Ady Krayem and Anan Kseem)
- MWR
- Mahmoud Shalaby
- Ibrahim Abu Rahala
- Female artists Arapeyat, Abeer Alzinaty, Nahwa Abed Al 'Al and Safaa Hathout.

== Screenings and awards ==
The film premiered at the 2008 Sundance Film Festival, was later shown on the Sundance Channel, and has won over 13 awards. It has shown in film festivals around the world, including International Documentary Film Festival Amsterdam, New Directors/New Films Festival, Stockholm International Film Festival, Sensoria Music & Film Festival, Bonnaroo Music Festival, DOX BOX Syria, Dubai International Film Festival, Beirut International Film Festival, Boston Palestine Film Festival.

In August 2008 Slingshot Hip Hop was shown to Palestinian youth in three of Lebanon's Palestinian refugee camps: Shatila, Bourj al-Barajneh, and Beddawi.

== See also ==
- Palestinian hip hop
- List of Palestinian films
