= Tul8te =

Egyptian guitarist, singer and rapper

- Born: Egypt
- Genres: Arabic pop; Arabic hip-hop
- Occupations: Singer; rapper; songwriter; record producer; guitarist
- Instruments: Vocals; guitar; oud
- Years active: 2022–present
- Labels: Vinyl Entertainment; Abu Recordings; MDLBeast Records

Tul8te (stylized in all caps and pronounced as "too late"; Arabic: تووليت) is an Egyptian guitarist, singer, rapper, songwriter and record producer. He has released four studio albums, two live albums and one EP.

== Career ==
Tul8te rose to fame with "Layalina", from his debut studio album, Tesh Shabab (2024), which earned him his first top five spot on the Egyptian IFPI charts.

His studio second album, entitled Cocktail Ghena'y, was released the following July. It placed five tracks in the national top ten and two in the Middle Eastern top ten simultaneously. Additionally, "Mateegy A3ady Aleiky" dethroned his own "Habeeby Leh", marking his second number one in his home country. "Habeeby Leh", however, returned to the top spot for five consecutive weeks. Tul8te earned six nominations at Billboard's Arabic Music Gala, where at the ceremony, he took home his first award. He was then busy with a world tour, which concluded in April 2025.

== Discography ==
=== Studio albums ===
- 2024 – Tesh Shabab
- 2024 – Cocktail Ghena'y
- 2025 – Narein
- 2026 – Sadeek El Bernameg

=== Live albums ===
- 2024 – Cocktail Ghena'y: Live Session
- 2026 – Narein Live Sessions (Jazz Edition)

=== Extended plays ===
- 2023 – Maghool

=== Singles ===
==== As lead artist ====
List of singles as lead artist, with selected chart positions, showing year released and album name
Title	Year	Peak chart positions						Album or EP
Title	Year	EGY	ARB	LBN	MENA	KSA	UAE	Album or EP
"Model El Sana"	2022	*		—	*			Non-album singles
"Eneya Betlama'"	2022	*		—	*			Non-album singles
"Mohy El Din Mosadak"	2022	*		—	*			Non-album singles
"Doctor Nafsany"	2022	*		—	*			Non-album singles
"Maghool"	2023	*		—	—	*		Maghool
"Lama Betetganen"	2024	—	—	—	—	—	—	Tesh Shabab
"Too Late"	2024	—	—	—	—	—	—	Tesh Shabab
"Layalina"	2024	4	16	—	—	—	—	Tesh Shabab
"Ma Tegi A'adi Aleiki"	2024	1	3	—	3	19	—	Cocktail Ghena'y
"Habibi Leh"	2024	1	2	8	2	8	—	Cocktail Ghena'y
"Qesm El Shakawy"	2025	7	18	—	—	—	—	Non-album single
"Narein"	2025	2	11	—	10	15	—	Narein
"Heseeny"	2025	1	6	—	2	2	—	Narein
"El Hob Gany"	2025	1	2	14	1	1	7	Non-album singles
"Seneen"	2026	1	5	—	16	—	—	Non-album singles
"Nano" (with Saint Levant)	2026	1	2	6	2	3	3	Non-album singles
"Garee'a Qaweya"	2026	1	1	16	1	2	2	Sadeek El Bernameg
"Ashan Habeeby"	2026	7	5	—	11	—	—	Non-album single
"Men Gheir Kalam"	2026	4	13	—	3	2	—	Sadeek El Bernameg
"Wala Ash Wala Kan"	2026	6	19	—	7	8	—	Sadeek El Bernameg
"—" denotes a recording that did not chart or was not released in that territory. "*" denotes that the chart did not exist at that time.

==== As featured artist ====
List of singles as featured artist, with selected chart positions, showing year released and album name
Title	Year	Peak chart positions	Album or EP
Title	Year	EGY	Album or EP
"Berka" (Hady Moamer featuring Tul8te, R3 and Tayeb Santo)	2024	—	Ma'koos
"Nasy" (SoulPhonic featuring Tul8te)	2024	—	Non-album singles
"Mesh Aadi" (Martcl featuring Tul8te)	2024	—	Non-album singles
"Fe Eineh" (Disco Misr featuring Tul8te)	2024	5	Non-album singles
"—" denotes a recording that did not chart or was not released in that territory.

=== Other charted songs ===
List of other charted songs, with selected chart positions, showing year released and album name
Title	Year	Peak chart positions		Album or EP
Title	Year	EGY	ARB	Album or EP
"Leih Benekhabi"	2024	6	32	Cocktail Ghena'y
"Ba'eit Waheed"	2024	3	18	Cocktail Ghena'y
"Habeeby Da"	2025	13	37	Narein
"Ghareeb Haly"	2025	—	70	Narein
"Shedeeny"	2025	5	17	Narein
"Oyoun El Nas" (with Amir Eid)	2025	—	69	Narein
"Enta Habeeby"	2026	—	21	Sadeek El Bernameg
"Haneish" (with Elyanna)	2026	—	26	Sadeek El Bernameg
"Ha'ak Alaya"	2026	—	38	Sadeek El Bernameg
"Kobtan"	2026	—	70	Sadeek El Bernameg
"—" denotes a recording that did not chart or was not released in that territory.
