= Omar Offendum =

Hip-hop artist and activist

- Born: December 18, 1981 (age 44); Saudi Arabia
- Education: University of Virginia, School of Architecture
- Occupations: rapper, designer, poet

Omar Offendum (Arabic: عمر افندم), is a Syrian American hip-hop artist, designer, poet and peace activist. He was born in Saudi Arabia, raised in Washington, DC, and now lives in Los Angeles, California. He tours the world performing internationally at music festivals, lecturing at major academic institutions and fundraising for humanitarian relief organizations. Most recently Offendum has been involved in creating several critically acclaimed songs about the popular democratic uprisings throughout the Middle East & North Africa (MENA region). He is also working on several new collaborative projects while touring to promote his solo work.

== Biography ==
Omar Offendum was born in Saudi Arabia and raised in Washington, D.C., where he attended the Islamic Saudi Academy. He graduated as valedictorian of his class in 1999 and went on to attend the University of Virginia School of Architecture. After graduating on the Dean's list in 2003, he moved to Los Angeles, California where he worked at an architecture firm for 10 years while simultaneously establishing his musical career.

== Early career ==
It was at UVA that Offendum began his career as part of The N.O.M.A.D.S duo, with Sudanese-American rapper Mr Tibbz. After moving to Los Angeles, Offendum started collaborating with the Palestinian-Filipino hip-hop trio The Phillistines. They worked to create Free the P – a compilation of hip-hop and spoken word dedicated to the youth of Palestine featuring artists from all over the world – which was the first Arab American rap record to receive national distribution (Ryko Warner). Offendum then began working with Iraqi-Canadian rapper Narcy and co-produced the Arab Summit album. He also co-authored the Brooklyn Beats to Beirut Streets performance lecture with HBO Def poet Mark Gonzalez.

== Solo career ==
Omar Offendum's song #Jan25, inspired by the Arab Spring uprisings in Egypt, became popular in 2011. It went viral via the internet, which Offendum sees as a key factor in the spread of international hip-hop. It was released in February 2011, shortly before the resignation of Egyptian president Hosni Mubarak.

Omar Offendum has often collaborated with Yassin Alsalman also known as Narcy and Shadia Mansour, "the first lady of Arabic hip hop."

== Discography ==
His first solo album, SyrianamericanA was released in 2011.

Offendum released "Close My Eyes", a reflection on fatherhood and immigration
