= Amir Almuarri =

Syrian rapper

- Born: 4 February 1999 (age 27); Maarrat al-Numan
- Occupations: Rapper from Idlib, Syria

Amir Almuarri (Arabic: أمير المُعَرّي) is a Syrian rapper who in 2019 achieved worldwide recognition for his music, which throws light on the suffering of the Syrian people.

== Career ==
Almuarri is a rapper from the town of Maarrat al-Numan, in the Idlib Governorate, an opposition-held area that suffered several bombing campaigns during the Syrian civil uprising and war. He gained worldwide recognition after the release of his latest composition "On all fronts", receiving coverage by Arabic and international media, where he rages against all those involved in the fighting and repression of the population.

The music video was filmed entirely in Idlib between August and September 2019, while the Governorate faced shelling by the Syrian regime and Russia. It features 62 civilians defying reprisals from local and external authorities.

Almuarri cites American rappers Wu-Tang Clan and Tupac as his main musical influences, and the poetry of his fellow country man Abu al-ʿAlaʾ al-Maʿarri as his literary inspiration. He follows the trend of Syrian rappers that deal with "issues such as identity, oppression and culture (...) and have contributed toward the advancement of the hip hop scene and given it a flavor of its own, quite distinct from American hip hop."
