= Illinois Housing Development Authority =

Illinois state agency

Agency overview
- Formed: 1967
- Jurisdiction: State of Illinois
- Headquarters: Chicago, Illinois
- Agency executive: King Harris, Chairman
- Website: https://www.ihda.org/

The Illinois Housing Development Authority (IHDA) is a quasi-independent State of Illinois agency that provides assistance, primarily but not exclusively through financing, for participants in the Illinois housing industry.

== Description ==
As of 2022, the IHDA derives its standing from the Illinois Housing Development Act, enacted in 1967. The Authority's original mission statement called for it to provide decent, safe, and sanitary housing to persons of low and moderate income. This has led to IHDA's role as a principal provider of financing for multi-unit housing projects dedicated to Illinois senior citizens.

To this original core goal were added other missions centering on the facilitation of mortgages for Illinois single-family housing, including housing for households of higher than low-to-moderate income. IHDA's role in the mortgage market has led to programs to aid first-time home buyers and to home buyers where a principal borrower is a member of the Illinois National Guard, or is a reservist in the U.S. armed forces. The IHDA prioritization of senior-citizen housing, conjoined with its increasing focus on mortgaged single-family housing, has led the agency to become a financier of single-family home renovations and modifications aimed at increasing accessibility to persons with limited mobility.

The Authority continues to serve as the secondary financier for many developments and redevelopments of Illinois multifamily residential housing. During the COVID-19 pandemic, IHDA became the State of Illinois agency of standing in the implementation of nationwide housing assistance for persons seeking emergency assistance with rental payments.

== Structure ==
- Office of Housing Coordination Services
- State Housing Task Force
- State Housing Appeals Board
- Illinois Affordable Housing Trust Fund Advisory Commission
- Asset Management Committee
- Audit Committee
- Finance Committee
