= Arabic hip-hop =

Music genre

Arabic hip-hop is a segment of hip hop music performed in the Arabic-speaking world. Due to variety of dialects and local genres which exist in the localities, Arabic hip-hop music may appear very diverse depending on the country of the song. Like most artists of the genre, the hip-hop artists from the Arabic-speaking world are highly influenced by American hip-hop.

== History ==
Before Arabic hip-hop emerged as a separate genre, Arab-Americans were regularly involved in hip-hop in the United States, such as Los Angeles-based producer Fredwreck and Miami-based DJ Khaled. American hip-hop music began to see popularity in the Arab World in the early-to-mid 1990s. Northern African Arabic-speakers in Europe, mostly residing in France, the epicenter of European hip-hop, were the first to begin making the music that constitutes the Arabic hip-hop genre. For example, the Saïan Supa Crew and IAM had Arabic members. This music, a product of the French banlieue's beur and noir communities, was a blend of traditional American hip-hop, the French styles popular at the time, and Raï, a popular music style from Northern Africa. French hip-hop rose to popularity partly because of Francophone radio broadcasting requirements, begun in 1994, that established quotas for all stations of 40% of daily broadcasts to be in French.

Groups began to emerge in Palestine in the mid-90s, including popular group DAM. DJ Lethal Skillz was promoting new local groups "such as Aks El Seir" at around the same time. In Egypt, American hip-hop was less popular, but a small buzz led to an emergent b-boy population. In 2004, the first hip-hop show took place there when the RZA, member of the Wu-Tang Clan, performed in the Siag Hotel in Cairo alongside Kinetic 9 of Killarmy, a Wu-Tang Clan affiliate, Cilvaringz (a Moroccan-Dutch, and the first Arab to get signed by an American rap group) and Saleh Edin, an American-Moroccan rapper.

In 2006, Arabic hip-hop solidified its mainstream presence in the Arab World with Hip Hop Na, a reality TV show on MTV Arabia hosted by Fredwreck and Qusai, a Saudi Arabian Artist. Hip-hop, both Arabic and American, is followed and created to varying degrees in most of the countries of the Arab world, including where social and political restrictions make this difficult. For example, Saudi Arabia is home to the group Dark2Men, who competed in the HipHopNa reality show mentioned above. In addition, break dancing "has become a popular pastime in the kingdom".

It is difficult to establish numbers for albums sold or listenership by demographic in the Arab world due to the lack of reliable statistics. Furthermore, viewership of satellite TV in the Arab world cannot be accurately quantified. However, we can discern popularity through marketing techniques utilized by satellite television providers. According to a 2007 report, "more than 85 percent of urban households in the Arab world have satellite television," a forum that has expanded to include music channels such as MTV Arabia which "[at the time] plan[ned] to offer a hefty dose of [mainly western] hip-hop and much of the same youth-lifestyle programming MTV beams across the U.S."

=== Female Hip-hop ===
Although it is unclear whether or not there is a separate and distinct female Arabic hip-hop genre, women around the world utilize hip-hop to contest gender stereotypes and cultural traditions. For many Arabic, female hip-hop artists, expressing their Islamic identity is also crucial to sharing their political messages and artistic expression, whether via rhythmic patterns or Arabic languages. Artists such as Shadia Mansour from Palestine and Malikah from Lebanon, are very eloquent in the Arabic Hip-Hop art form, then we have the Egyptian EmpresS *1 the "First Female Egyptian Rapper" in Egypt that is more on the African tip giving credit to both her North African and Middle Eastern roots. Female hip-hop artists are involved in a number of outreach activities in the Arabic, African and International World. In 2010 EmpresS *1 was invited from Egypt to Khartoum, Sudan by the Ministry of Culture, Studio One and Space, to workshop and perform at Beit el Fenoon, working with young Sudanese rappers, poets and singers from different parts of Sudan. EmpresS *1 has also done similar work in the UK, Brazil and Egypt. Shadia Mansour Arabia's "First Lady of Hip-Hop" pays regular visits to Palestine to help with musical aid throughout the war. Female Arab Rappers performed at "Home and Exile in Queer Experience", a conference organized by Aswat, "an organization for Arab lesbians with members in Israel, the West Bank, and Gaza Strip".

== Influences ==
=== Musical Influence ===
Arabic hip-hop artists, commensurate with those of the overall genre, engage in the process of sampling. According to Jannis Androutsopoulos, sampling is "a process of cultural literacy and intertextual reference... taken from various domains, such as traditional folk music, contemporary popular music, mass media samples, and even poetry." Artists in the genre cite musical references, influences, and sampling material from a number of contemporary and classical sources, including 20th century Lebanese singers Fairuz, Majida al-Roumi, and Julia Boutros, as well as a number of modern mainstream and underground hip-hop artists, and regional music styles from countries such as Jamaica. Sampling can act as a timeline for artists to assess recurring historical events. Arabic hip hop artists have used full Arabic orchestras in beat-making as well as beats inspired by traditional Arabic music styles.

==== Raï ====
Certain regional variations of the music, notably French and Northern African styles, incorporate influences from the musical genre known as Raï, "a form of folk music that originated in Oran, Algeria from Bedouin shepherds, mixed with Spanish, French, African and Arabic musical forms, which dates back to the 1930s."

In the Netherlands, Raï has gained popularity, especially among migrants from North Africa. Artists such as Dystinct, Boef and Numidia have incorporated elements of Raï into their music. Iliass Mansouri, also known as Dystinct, is a Belgian-Moroccan artist with significant popularity in the Netherlands. Dystinct is known for blending Raï melodies with R&B, trap music, and Afrobeat. Songs like TekTek and Business feature Arabic instruments and scales, common in Raï. Sofiane Youssef Samir Boussaadia, professionally known as Boef, is a French-Algerian rapper. In his song "Habiba" he incorporates beat structures influenced by Raï. Numidia El Morabet, also known as Numidia, is a Dutch-Moroccan singer. Her song "Dana", a collaboration with Ali B, Cheb Rayan, and R3HAB, reflects Raï melodic structures and rhythms.

The genre's growing popularity in the Netherlands is also reflected by several concerts in the country, featuring Raï or artists influenced by it. On 13 January 2024, the famous Algerian Raï band Raïna Raï performed at het Zonnehuis in Amsterdam, combining rock instruments with traditional Algerian rhythms. On 7 December 2024, Swedish-Lebanese artist Maher Zain performed at the RAI Theater in Amsterdam. His work incorporates musical elements that resonate with Raï influences.

=== International Influence ===
Linguistically, utilizing a blend of languages increased the accessibility of Arabic hip-hop to broader, international audiences. Amid historical events of protest, such as the Arab Spring, increasing accessibility would strengthen Arabic resistance. In addition to accessibility, it would also call attention to global policies that directly influenced Arab life.

The subject of American Muslim hip-hop has forged countless Arab identities on a global scale via religious empowerment. For Sunni artist Yasiin Bey, including verses of the Quran in his music means blessing his work as it is released to the public. Religion is a fundamental component of Arabic identity.

=== Political and Social Influence ===
Much of the hip-hop generated in the Arab World deals with a mix of social circumstances, such as poverty, violence, and drug use, as well as political reality, insofar as this is possible given censorship. The hip-hop of Palestine in particular has generated much interest in this respect and the music is considered a means of opposition. For example, the song "Meen Erhabe" by DAM aligns itself with opposition to the Israeli occupation, and was referred to critically as a "theme song for Hamas".

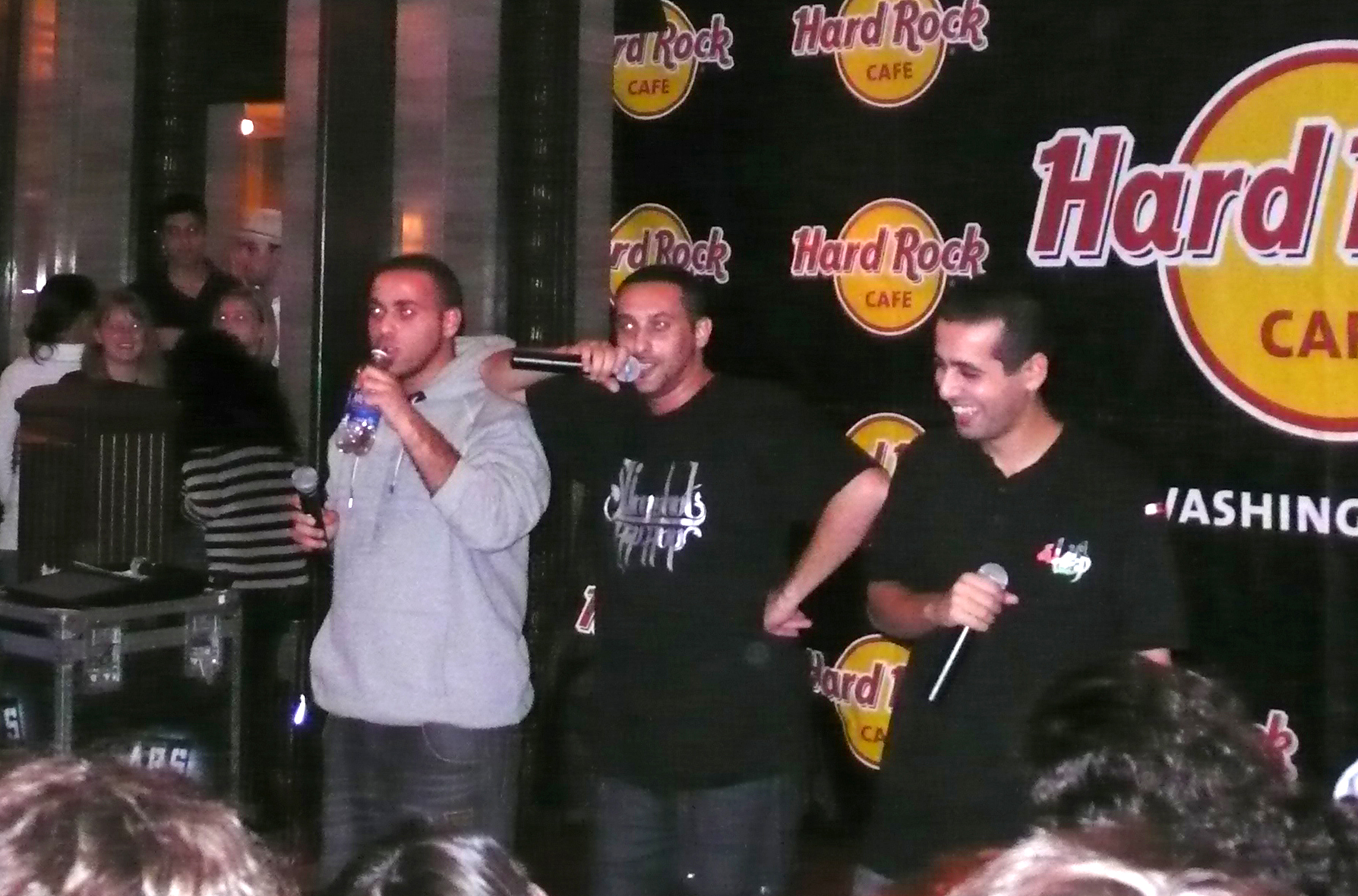
Palestinian hip-hop trio DAM

True to form, the Hip-Hop of occupied Palestine evokes themes of struggle and resistance as artists lay beats about drugs, violence, and the daily oppression they face under Occupation. Reminiscent of the multiple messages voiced through American Hip-Hop and Rap, artists in Palestine use music as a means to unify people who share common struggles. Their artistic expression represent the "drama of the streets", the harsh reality of cultural and ethnic subjugation, and continues to be a productive means of expression for Palestinian youth to communicate with one another across the region and hopefully soon, with the rest of the world.

— Greta Anderson Finn, Political Art: "Arab American Hip-Hop"

Arabic hip-hop has been both an active player in and directly influenced by the changing political and social conditions of the region over the past two years. The Arab Spring, in particular, as a revolutionary movement affecting numerous states, including Tunisia, Egypt, Libya, Syria, and Yemen, elicited musical responses from emergent or formerly repressed hip-hop artists. Hip-hop and rap music were the soundtrack to the Arab Spring as the protest movements chanted to the poetics of young, influential rappers.

Issues such as poverty, rising unemployment, hunger, and oppressive authoritarian regimes were all part of the politicized messages of hip-hop music. Hip-hop served as a mode of resistance in dissenting against authoritarian states, as well as a tool for mobilization in mass demonstrations. As such, the conventions of the hip-hop genre within the Arab context, provided a voice for marginalized citizens within these revolutionary and subsequently transitional states. Arabic hip-hop is most typically directed towards and most relevant to youth populations, who made up a substantial number of political actors in the Arab Spring.

Hip-hop music that emerged from the Arab Spring movements, though directly influenced by particular social and political realities, transcended borders and resonated throughout the region. This was largely achieved through social media, as artists and activists share their music via Facebook, YouTube, and Twitter. At this time, hip-hop songs were a symbol of national identity across the Middle East, further amplifying music as a method of protest. While resisting Arab politics, hip-hop artists utilized English in their lyrics to make their messages more understandable to a broader audience.

Outside of the Arab World, artists focus on many of the same types of issues, but there is a stronger focus on issues associated with immigration and living as ethnic minorities. In France, for example, much of the "socially critical" music focuses on "migration related problems such as discrimination, xenophobia, and the problematic identities of young people of foreign descent." Furthermore, these artists deal with the government enforced impetus for assimilation "coupled with the age-old stereotypes rooted in colonial references and the stigma of the marginalized banlieue."

Arabic hip-hop artists in the west, particularly Great Britain and North America, who also deal with racism and marginalization in their content, specifically mention an experience of "doubleness" – internal conflict between traditional and modern culture. For some rap and spoken word artists, hip-hop is seen as being true to both, due both to the rich Arabic poetic history and to the utility of hip-hop as a form of expression for marginalized or demonized communities. The poet Lawrence Joseph addresses the conflict explicitly in his poem "Sand Nigger".

The view of mainstream America towards the Arab population, domestically and worldwide, and military intervention in the MENA region factor prominently in Arab American hip-hop and other western forms. Following 9/11, American medias escalated Arab alienization in the U.S. and other Western countries, enhancing the toxic light on Muslim Americans. Certain artists from the Arab world approach the western viewpoint similarly, such as the Emirati group Desert Heat who rap in English specifically for the purpose of "educating" westerners on a realistic view of Arabic culture and history.

Further, physical performances also carry political messages in Arabic hip-hop. The keffiyeh, a traditional, Arabic headdress, has grown in popularity as a symbol of Arab and Palestinian culture. It represents resistance and solidarity.

== Israel-Palestine ==
Within the Israel-Palestine conflict, rap and hip-hop have been used to describe oppression. Hip-hop has a history of representing youth culture and mirroring the political landscape of the conflict. Beginning in the 1990s, Palestinian hip-hop first arose following the end of the Oslo accords, marking a new era for Palestinian nationalism and solidarity.

Apart from DAM, other Arabic hip-hop artists have been vocal about the conflict as well, such as Shadia Mansour, Samar Tarek, and Mazen al Sayed. The focus of Palestinian representation of the conflict is more prevalent among Arab hip-hop artists. For more information, see Palestinian hip-hop

For young Palestinians, using music as an outlet, particularly hip-hop, allows them to break cultural boundaries and establish their own identities. Palestinian artist Saint Levant has been vocal within his music and concerts about the conflict. Due to his immigration to the United States at a young age, his music blends Arabic, French, and English. His musical activism opens the doors to American audiences. The Palestinian struggle is also brought to the American stage by Macklemore's release of Hinds Hall, in which he declares his support for the Palestinian cause.

Dutch hip-hop artists, such as Ismo, Lijpe, Appa, Josylvio and Fresku, have mentioned the conflict in their songs. Dutch-Moroccan rapper Ismo for example, who is also known as Ismail Houllich, released a track called "Free Palestina" in 2015. In this song he declares his support for Palestine.

== Censorship ==
Associative life and media are restricted to varying degrees throughout the Arab world. Reasons for censorship, whether state enforced or community enforced, generally fall under two categories – political or religious. Vis-a-vis state control, satellite TV has done much to restrict the state monopoly on television programming. This has directly impacted the space allowed for hip-hop music and culture.

In religiously conservative Arab states, such as Saudi Arabia, "singing and dancing can be viewed as shameful," therefore enforcing somewhat of a social censorship (enforced as a "taboo") on hip-hop and other art forms. As of 2008, concerts and nightclubs were non-existent in the Kingdom, and local radio and TV played mainly Arabic pop music (all state enforced policies). Tamer Farhan, a member of the Saudi rap group Dark2Men that appeared on HipHopNa, said that rappers in Saudi Arabia are forced "underground because of the wrong impression people have of them". Even socially cautious acts are subject to censorship. This phenomenon is not restricted to Saudi Arabia however, as relatively liberal Kuwait joined them in banning the group Desert Heat's first album despite their "pro-Muslim" message and "cautious approach to religion, politics, and society".

However, hip-hop music, both Arabic and American, has managed to circumnavigate some of these restrictions. In addition to subversion via the internet or bootleg record sales, it seems that censorship inconsistencies and/or linguistic difficulty associated with translating hip-hop from English may account for some English language records making their way to cities where they would otherwise be banned. Abdullah Dahman of Desert Heat offers an example of west coast rapper Snoop Dogg, whose records are available for purchase in Jeddah in Saudi Arabia. Another example, 2 Live Crew's album "As Nasty as They Wanna Be", released in 1989, made it by censors due to translational difficulty.

Hip-hop music from the Arab Spring movement presented direct challenges to the strict censorship policies of many regimes throughout the Middle East and North African region. Arabic hip-hop became a means of expression that actively resisted against the state and its regulations. In states like Tunisia, a state that previously censored all negative public statements against the government and was characterized as having one of the least free media in the world, hip-hop music became a visible representation of the resistance and signaled the impending social and political changes. Several rappers were arrested for their music, including El General in Tunisia and El Haqed of Morocco, which only generated more attention to the issue of censorship and the artists themselves.

== Regional Arabic Hip-hop ==
Hip hop communities in different Arab countries are interconnected with each other to varying degrees and also have connections to their respective diaspora communities in the US and Europe. Here are some Arabic-speaking countries listed alphabetically:

=== Egypt ===
Within the Arab world, Egypt has been a powerhouse when it comes to pop culture and Arab cinema. From the 1940s to the present day, cinema has consistently incorporated music. In recent decades, the global dominance of Western hip-hop has also influenced Arab cinema, which has taken over and adapted this musical trend within its soundtracks.

From the 2000s onward, Arabic Rap in Egypt has become more prevalent. Artists like Wegz, TUL8TE, and Mohammed Ramadan have dominated the Egyptian music scene. Mohammed Ramadan brought Egyptian hiphop to the world stage with his performance at Coachella 2025 in California. He was the first Egyptian artist to perform at Coachella. Similarly, TUL8TE, who sold out his first world tour in 2024- 2025, has garnered a following from Gen-Z audiences. He is described by the Grammys as: "a rising arab popstar bringing Egyptian culture to the world."

=== Saudi Arabia ===
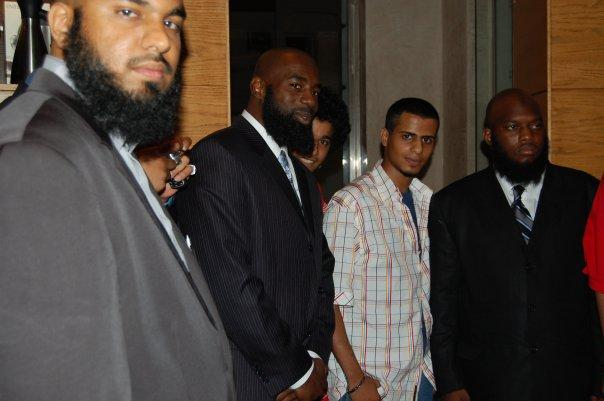
Klash with Loon (rapper) in Jeddah

Hip hop emerged in the Kingdom of Saudi Arabia around 2003 as an online community of rappers sharing their work and competing for fans. A rapper named Klash became infamous for his allegedly racist lyrics. Klash and his friends initially focused on social issues such as unemployment and nepotism. It was common for groups of teenage and young adult friends, or "gangs", to produce music on these themes.

A diss track was released against Klash by someone who was offended by his lyrics and sought revenge. Klash responded with his own diss track, and soon he and a growing number of rappers were turning their attention to diss tracks. Klash's diss tracks attracted many fans, and this led to young people adopting this style, which made Klash famous. Some of the rappers in Saudi Arabia include Abady, Mohamed Mood, Money, and Roger Satam.

=== Syria ===
Refugees Of Rap (Arabic: لاجئي الراب; French: "Les Réfugiés Du Rap") is a Syrian-Palestinian hip-hop group based in Paris, France. Two brothers, Yaser and Mohamed Jamous, created the group in 2007, in a Palestinian refugee camp in Yarmouk, Syria. The brothers' texts offer a glimpse of life in the camp and denounce the situation in Syria. Forced into exile in 2013, the brothers became refugees in France the same year.

Their collaboration led to several artistic projects. From 2007 to 2012, the band performed concerts and performed in Syria, Egypt, and Lebanon. The group collaborated with multiple other artists, including Tamer Nafar (DAM), Tarabband, and Linda Bitar, to release two albums in 2010 and 2014. Since their arrival in Europe as refugees, the group has performed in several festivals and participated in several artistic and associated projects (France, Italy, Spain, Germany, Sweden, Denmark, Norway).

In the continuity of their project, the two brothers offer musical workshops to young teens. These writing workshops are based around the notion of freedom of expression, where messages of peace and tolerance circulate in a humanist approach that democratizes rap and allows young people from all walks of life to express themselves through music and words.

Throughout their career, the group has attracted the interest of several media such as Rolling Stone magazine, the World, BBC or ARTE, Vice, Konbini, The Guardian, Radio France, TV5 Complex. Refugees of Rap also organized a "rap writing" workshop last one was at Octave Mirbeau College in Trévières.

Omar Offendum is a Syrian American hip-hop artist, designer, poet and peace activist. He was born in Saudi Arabia, raised in Washington, DC, and now lives in Los Angeles, California. His song #Jan25, inspired by the Arab Spring uprisings in Egypt, went viral in 2011, shortly before the resignation of Egyptian president Hosni Mubarak. Omar Offendum has often collaborated with Yassin Alsalman, also known as Narcy, and with renowned hip-hop artist Shadia Mansour.

Amir Almuarri (Arabic: أمير المعري) is an Idlib-based rapper who achieved worldwide recognition for his music in 2019. His work draws attention to the suffering of the Syrian people under siege. A notable composition, entitled "On all fronts", expresses Almuarri's anger toward all parties involved in the fighting. It received widespread coverage by Arabic and international media.

=== Tunisia ===
Hamada Ben Amor, known as El General, is a Tunisian rapper. El General's popularity is largely attributable to his musical contributions to the Jasmine Revolution that took place in his home country. El General began producing hip-hop music prior to the revolution and largely relied upon social media to publicize his music. His first recording, "Rais LeBled", was posted to YouTube in November 2010. The song was an attack on the former authoritarian ruler, Zine El Abidine Ben-Ali, and the poor conditions in the state, including poverty, unemployment, and political and social injustices.

Following the suicide attempt by Mohammed Bouazizzi in Sidi Bouzzid, Tunisia, which prompted the revolutionary movement, El General's music was used in ensuing demonstrations. El General released subsequent songs, which similarly criticize the government and called for the end to Ben-Ali's regime. Consequently, he was arrested and imprisoned by Tunisian state police. His imprisonment further propelled the popularity of his music and activists demanded his release. El General was released soon after Ben-Ali fled the country in January 2011. El General is widely considered to be one of the largest musical influences emerging from the Arab Spring and is considered to have made direct contributions to political activism during the Jasmine Revolution in Tunisia.

=== United Arab Emirates ===
Hip-hop was found in Forums Year 2001 in the United Arab Emirates was not given his rights for being too underground for listeners. There aren't many rappers in the UAE. Unfortunately, no one wants to listen.

Desert Heat was formed in late 2002, consists of two Emirati brothers 'Illmiyah' (eel-mee-yah) & 'Arableak', Mustafa qarooni Emirati Rapper known with his stage name Dj Sadcat started in 2004, In the year 2009 Sadcat had met a Car Accident in which created a song (Surrounded) for his situation the song was on YouTube until the listeners they started reporting the song for be to real and sad to listen

=== Yemen ===
The hip hop major outbreak in Yemen is often associated to the influence of Hagage "AJ" Masaed, an American-Yemeni rapper producing music since 1997. Although he had grown in the United States, AJ has successfully reached Yemeni audience by addressing to local issues and incorporating traditional musical language into his hits. This versatility was also one of the reasons he drew international recognition, since he entered in the Yemeni music scene, he has been partnering up with several Yemeni artists, such as Hussein Muhib, Fuad Al-Kibisi, Fuad Al-Sharjabi, Ibrahim Al-Taefi, Abdurahman Al-Akhfash and others, and helping new ones to develop their talents. He has also played a major role on propagating the understanding of rap as a means of change.

One contributing factor to the development of the music is also the creation of Yemen Music House in 2007. that has been providing assets to the development of a contemporary music scene In 2009, took place the first Yemeni Rap public festival, co-sponsored by the French and German foreign-missions Due to the importance of this event, AJ draws a comparison between it and the fall of the Berlin Wall.

== See also ==
- Algerian hip hop
- Egyptian hip hop
- Lebanese hip hop
- Moroccan hip hop
- Palestinian hip hop
