= Salah Edin =

Dutch-Moroccan rapper (born 1980)

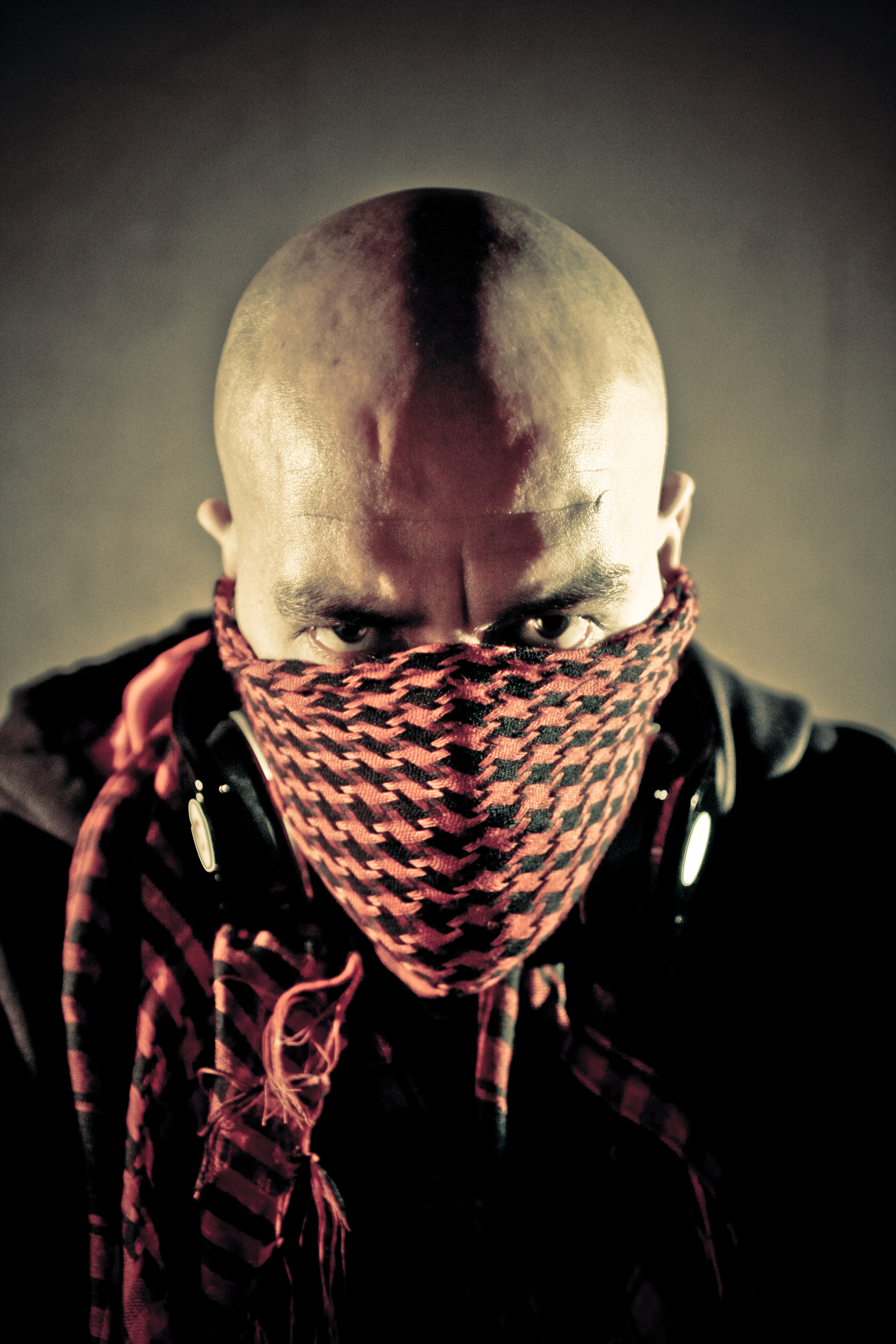

Background information
- Born: Abid Tounssi; 23 June 1980 (age 46)
- Genre: Hip hop
- Occupations: Rapper; actor
- Instruments: Vocals
- Years active: 1990s–2016
- Label: TopNotch

Abid Tounssi (Arabic: عبيد تونسي, born 23 June 1980), better known by his stage name Salah Edin, is a Dutch-Moroccan ex-rapper and actor.

== Career ==
=== Rapper ===
Abid Tounssi began rapping in the early 1990s and broke through to a larger audience in 2006 when he signed with Dutch hip hop label TopNotch. He initially rapped in English for a short period before switching to Arabic and Dutch. His lyrics are often socially critical. His stage name, Salah Edin, is a reference to the Kurdish general Saladin, who recaptured Jerusalem from the Crusaders.

In 2003, Salah Edin met rapper-producer Cilvaringz and signed a contract with his company. This deal also meant Salah Edin secured the role of opening act for major international rappers like the Wu-Tang Clan, Outlandish, and Black Eyes Peas on their world tours. As a result, he participated in large world hip-hop tours, visiting 37 countries.

In December 2005, he was featured on an album by Outlandish and Idols finalist Hind Laroussi. In 2006, he released an official mixtape as a preview of his upcoming Arabic album, rapping about poverty, the Israeli-Palestinian conflict, politics, and religion. That same year, he made his film debut with a minor role in Bolletjes Blues.

In early May 2007, he launched his Dutch-language album, Nederlands Grootste Nachtmerrie (The Netherlands' Biggest Nightmare). The album was entirely produced by Focus, the right-hand man of Dr. Dre and a regular producer for his label, Aftermath. On April 4, 2007, the Dutch political party SGP submitted parliamentary questions regarding the subsidy for his music video "Het Land Van...", in which the rapper highlights aspects of Dutch society that he argues lead to the radicalization of Muslim youth. The video was subsidized by the TAX video clip fund. The title references the song and album of the same name by Lange Frans & Baas B, which, in contrast, emphasized the positive aspects of the Netherlands.

The album cover for Nederlands Grootste Nachtmerrie depicts Edin made up to resemble Mohammed Bouyeri, the murderer of Theo van Gogh. The portrait meant to critique how Islamophobia in the Netherlands leads the public to view all young Muslim men as the same. This cover photo was mistakenly used twice as an actual photo of Bouyeri: first in May 2007 by the free newspaper DAG, and again in Geert Wilders' film Fitna, released on March 27, 2008. Critics argued that Salah Edin intentionally recreated Bouyeri's photo to cause confusion. Salah Edin successfully sued Wilders for using his image. In response, according to Edin, Wilders offered to appear in a rap song with him. He refused, and the judge decided in favor of Edin, ordering Wilders to pay €3,000 to the rapper and €5,000 to the photographer.

In late 2008, the Hollywood film Rendition, starring Meryl Streep and Jake Gyllenhaal, was released, featuring Salah Edin's music. This made him the first Arabic-language rapper to have his music used in a major Hollywood production.

In April 2009, he released his Arabic debut album, Horr (Free/Pure), which received positive international reviews. With this, Salah Edin became the first Arabic-language rapper to sign with a major international record label, Universal. In 2010, his second Dutch-language album, WO II, was released, featuring collaborations with both national and international producers. The album was slated for release in September 2011; the title is a reference to World War II, but carries other connotations as well, with the initials also referring to Willem Oltmans and Geert Wilders.

In 2016, Salah Edin announced he would no longer make music due to the immense pressure involved. He also cited religious reasons for his decision to retire as a recording artist.

=== Actor ===
Salah Edin has acted in several films and series, including Flow, the Paul Ruven-directed film Gangsterboys, and the crime series Penoza. In 2010, he directed a new four-part series of urban stories about Amsterdam. That same year, he acted in a short Moroccan film, with another film already finished and a TV series in the making.

== Discography ==
=== Demos ===
- 2003 - Hakma

=== Albums ===
- 2007 - Nederlands Grootste Nachtmerrie ("Netherlands' Biggest Nightmare", TopNotch)
- 2009 - HORR
- 2011 - WOII

=== Mixtapes ===
- 2006 - The Official Mixtape

=== Contributing artist ===
- 2012 - The Rough Guide to the Music of Morocco (World Music Network)

== Filmography ==
=== Film ===
Year	Title	Role	Notes
2006	Bolletjes Blues	Tan	Member of a drug gang
2010	Gangsterboys		African
2010	De President	Protester	
2011	All Stars 2: Old Stars	Prisoner	

=== Television ===
Year	Title	Role	Notes
2008	Flow	Maleeq	
2010	Penoza	Prisoner	
2011	Seinpost	Prisoner	Drug dealer
2014	Infiltrant	Criminal	

== See also ==
- List of Arab rappers
