= Volgin =

Volgin (Russian: Волгин) is a Russian surname derived from the river Volga.

It can refer to:

- Andrei Volgin (football) (born 1988)
- Viacheslav Petrovich Volgin (1879–1962), Russian historian
- Volgin, nom de guerre of the revolutionary and Marxist theorist Georgi Plekhanov
- Yevgeny Borisovitch Volgin - one of the antagonists in the video game Metal Gear Solid 3: Snake Eater
- Alexandra Volgina
