= Mohamed Mood =

Sudanese rapper

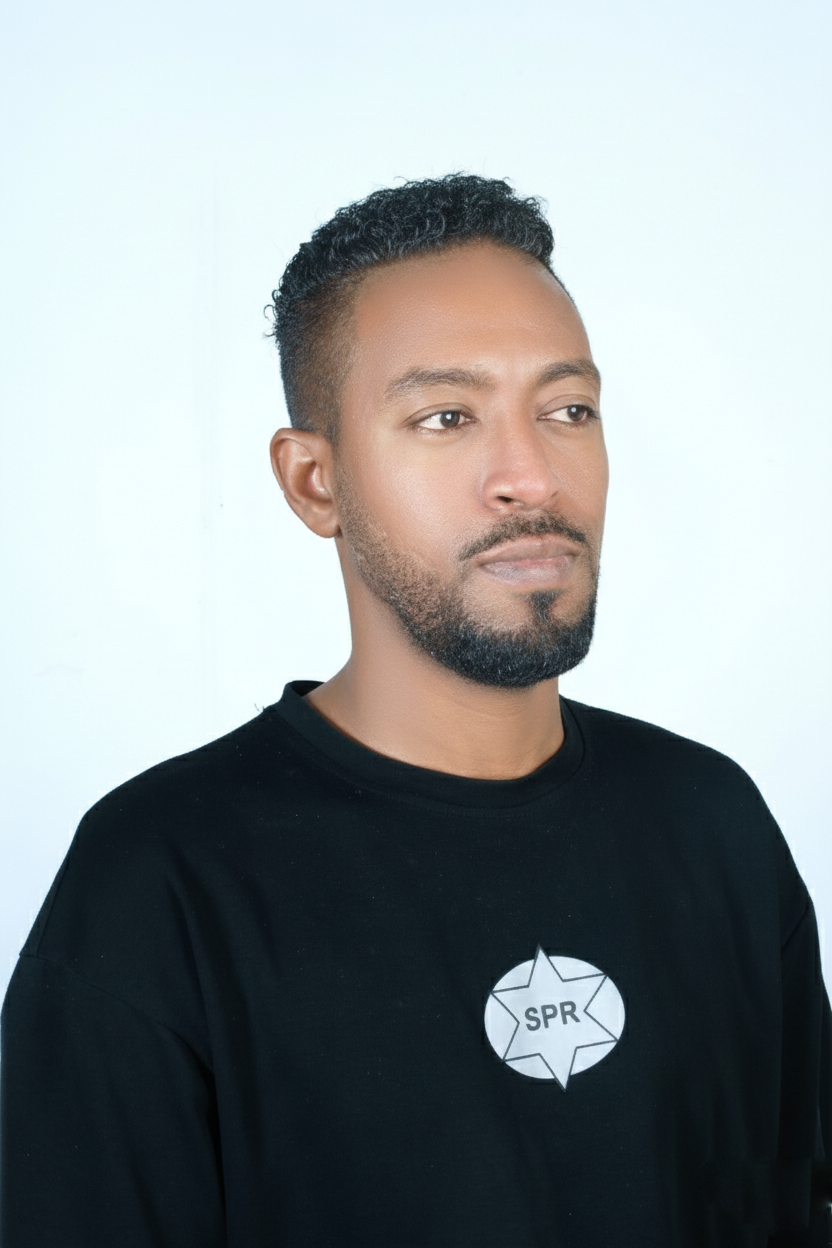

Background information
- Born: Mohamed Mustafa Al-Sharif; January 1, 1986 (age 40); Jeddah, Saudi Arabia
- Origin: Sudan
- Genres: Hip hop, rap
- Occupations: Rapper, singer,songwriter
- Years active: 2004–present
- Website: https://mohamedmood.com/

Mohamed Mood (Arabic: محمد مود; muˈħamːad muːd, born January 1, 1986, in Jeddah, Saudi Arabia, as Mohamed Mustafa Al Sharif), is a Sudanese rapper and songwriter active in the contemporary Gulf hip-hop scene.

== Personal life ==
Mohamed Mood was born on January 1, 1986, in Jeddah, Saudi Arabia, to parents of Sudanese origin.

== Career ==
Mohamed Mood began releasing hip-hop material in 2004, distributing his music online. In 2010, he released the song "My Friends", which was referenced in regional media coverage.

Throughout the 2010s, he continued releasing independent projects and digital singles. Regional media outlets have discussed his work in relation to the Gulf hip-hop scene.

== Discography ==
=== Songs ===
- 2004: "Arab world"
- 2004: "Satellite"
- 2005: "Take the knowledge"
- 2005: "Diameter of time"
- 2005: "Gulf Rose"
- 2006: "Principled"
- 2008: "Reasonable"
- 2008: "Outlaws"
- 2009: "Freedom caravan"
- 2009: "And you will stay"
- 2010: "My friends"
- 2012: "Living is on the rise"
- 2012: "Shut up"
- 2012: "American passport"
- 2012: "Shut up 2"
- 2014: "We are living"
- 2014: "dunya ghariba"
- 2014: "Rubariya Nas Kom"
- 2015: "Invasion and Staty"
- 2015: "Who else but You, my Lord"
- 2015: "most precious person"
- 2015: "Class of people"
- 2015: "Without them"
- 2015: "Arabic rap"
- 2015: "Heating the outside"
- 2016: "I am a human being"
- 2016: "West Coast"
- 2016: "Chance alone"
- 2016: "power of the mind"
- 2017: "My pen"
- 2017: "Free man"
- 2017: "Zoom in on the microscope"
- 2018: "mustahil ansak"
- 2019: "yaruh alruwh"
- 2019: "yarab"
- 2019: "kan zaman"
- 2020: "muqim walakin"
- 2021: "orphan"
- 2020: "corona"
- 2021: "ahil alhawaa"
- 2021: "mahu qadir"
- 2022: "ant malik"
- 2022: "Take it easy"
- 2023: "Ittihad Forever"
- 2024: "Missing"
- 2024: "ana atihadi"
- 2024: "Monopoly"
- 2024: "daqu nazif"
- 2024: "mabna shi"
- 2024: "hadu alsabr"
- 2025: "bidunik"
- 2025: "ghawi yaltaeab"
- 2025: "Dos"
- 2025: "yati masha' allah"
- 2025: "drubi"
- 2025: "Night’s Grip"
