= Didine Canon 16 =

Algerian rapper (born 1993)

- Khireddine Youcef
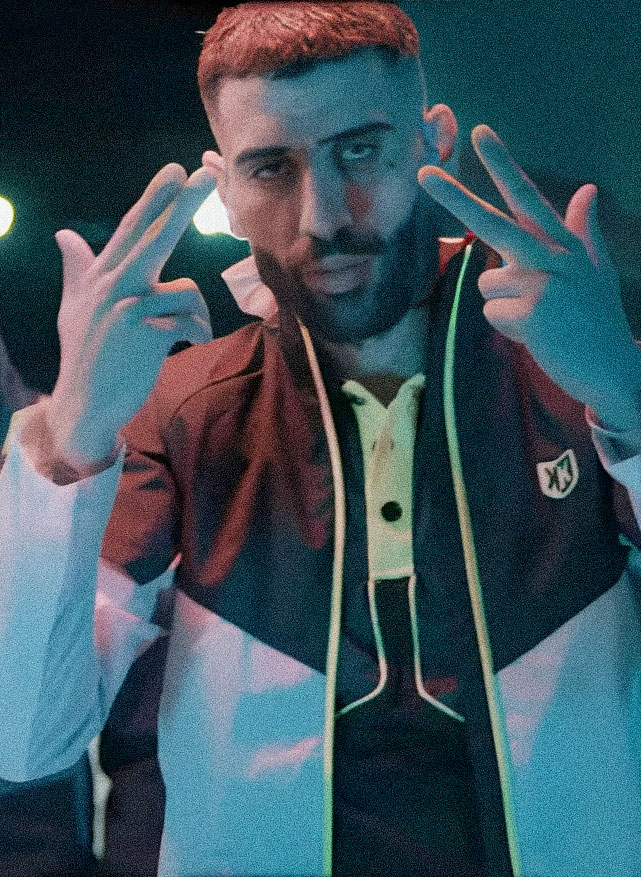
- Didine Canon 16 in 2023
- Born: Khireddine Youcef; 2 January 1993 (age 33); Staouéli, Algiers
- Citizenship: Algeria
- Occupations: Rapper; singer; songwriter; actor
- Years active: 2012–present

Didine Canon 16 is the stage name of Khireddine Youcef (Arabic: خير الدين يوسف; born 2 January 1993), an Algerian rapper, singer-songwriter, and actor. Since 2015, he has been one of the most popular rappers in the Maghreb region. His YouTube channel has surpassed 2.1 billion views since its creation in 2018.

== Biography ==
Didine Canon 16, whose real name is Khireddine Youcef, was born on January 2, 1993, in Staoueli, a municipality in the province of Algiers, Algeria. He hails from a family in Beni Ourtilane.

In 2015, he released a song titled "Akhténi," which garnered significant success and introduced him to the rap scene.

By 2018, Didine Canon 16 shifted his style to appeal to a broader audience, exploring mainstream music. He signed a contract with the label "Chabaka Net" and released "Aicha la vie," a music video shot in Dubai and directed by the Algerian Stefan Redjimi. This video accumulated nearly 76 million views on YouTube as of July 2023. His success opened doors for him, including signing with production companies like the international music platform Anghami.

In January 2020, he released a track titled "El Ma9youd," which reached a million views in less than 24 hours. By 2023, this song surpassed 78 million views.

In December 2020, the Moroccan rapper 7liwa publicly dissed him in a track titled "Trump".

In 2021, Didine Canon 16 teamed up with Middle Eastern rappers to form a new collective called ARXP Cartel, which was launched under the PopArabia label.

In 2022, he cancelled a concert in Constantine due to the massive public. In September of the same year, the TikTok account of the Premier League used one of his songs to pay tribute to Riyad Mahrez.

In August 2022, he announced that Netflix had contacted him and that they were collaborating to produce a new series.

In February 2023, he collaborated with Egyptian artist Mohamed Ramadan on a song titled "Nassaba," produced by Rotana Music.

In July 2023, Lotfi Double Canon, another rapper, made his comeback with a song called "Rap it," along with a music video. This autobiographical song outlined the major events of his career. However, Didine Canon 16 contested the song and challenged Lotfi Double Canon, saying, "I would have liked you to rap about our late Nahel, who was killed in France by the police." Didine Canon's video sparked outrage among the majority of Algerian rappers.

In 2022, alongside other artists, he claimed a style they named "Zenqaoui," where he portrays himself as the voice of the youth. He sings about various topics, including social issues, and has gained immense popularity in the Maghreb region.

== Discography ==
=== Albums ===
- 2021: Atlantis
- 2024: Phenix

=== EPs ===
- 2023: Seven souls
- 2023: The fallen angel
- 2024: Vladimir
- 2024: Khamsa
- 2025: Barberousse

=== Collaborations ===
- 2020 : Sanfara – Doctor Ft. Didine Canon 16
- 2020 : Didine Canon 16 – Melit Ft. Tflow
- 2020 : Moro – La loi Ft. Didine Canon 16
- 2021 : Lbenj – Khdem Ft. Didine Canon 16
- 2022 : Mc Artisan – Glock Ft. Didine Canon 16
- 2022 : Samara – Le Dem Ft. Didine Canon 16
- 2022 : Didine Canon 16 – Trafiquinté Ft. Kofs
- 2022 : Jul – Sous tension Ft. Didine Canon 16, Samara
- 2022 : Didine Canon 16 – Fugitive Ft. Rim'K
- 2022 : L'Wew – GTA Ft. Didine Canon 16
- 2023 : Mohamed Ramadan Ft. Didine Canon 16 – Nassaba
- 2023 : Didine Canon 16 – Yakuza Ft. Mister You
- 2023 : Didine Canon 16 – Barrio Ft. Cheb Bilal, Kofs, Fouzi Torino
- 2023 : Didine Canon 16 – Newton (collaboration avec FootKorner)

== Filmography ==
- 2021: Ahwal Nass 2

== Private life ==
Didine Canon 16 has three children, two boys and a girl, with his ex-wife Yasmine.
