= Narcy (rapper) =

- Also known as: The Narcicyst
- Born: Yassin Alsalman; May 26, 1982 (age 44); Dubai, United Arab Emirates
- Origin: Basra, Iraq
- Genre: Alternative hip hop
- Occupations: Rapper; singer; author; lecturer; actor
- Years active: 2000–present
- Website: www.wearethemedium.com/narcy

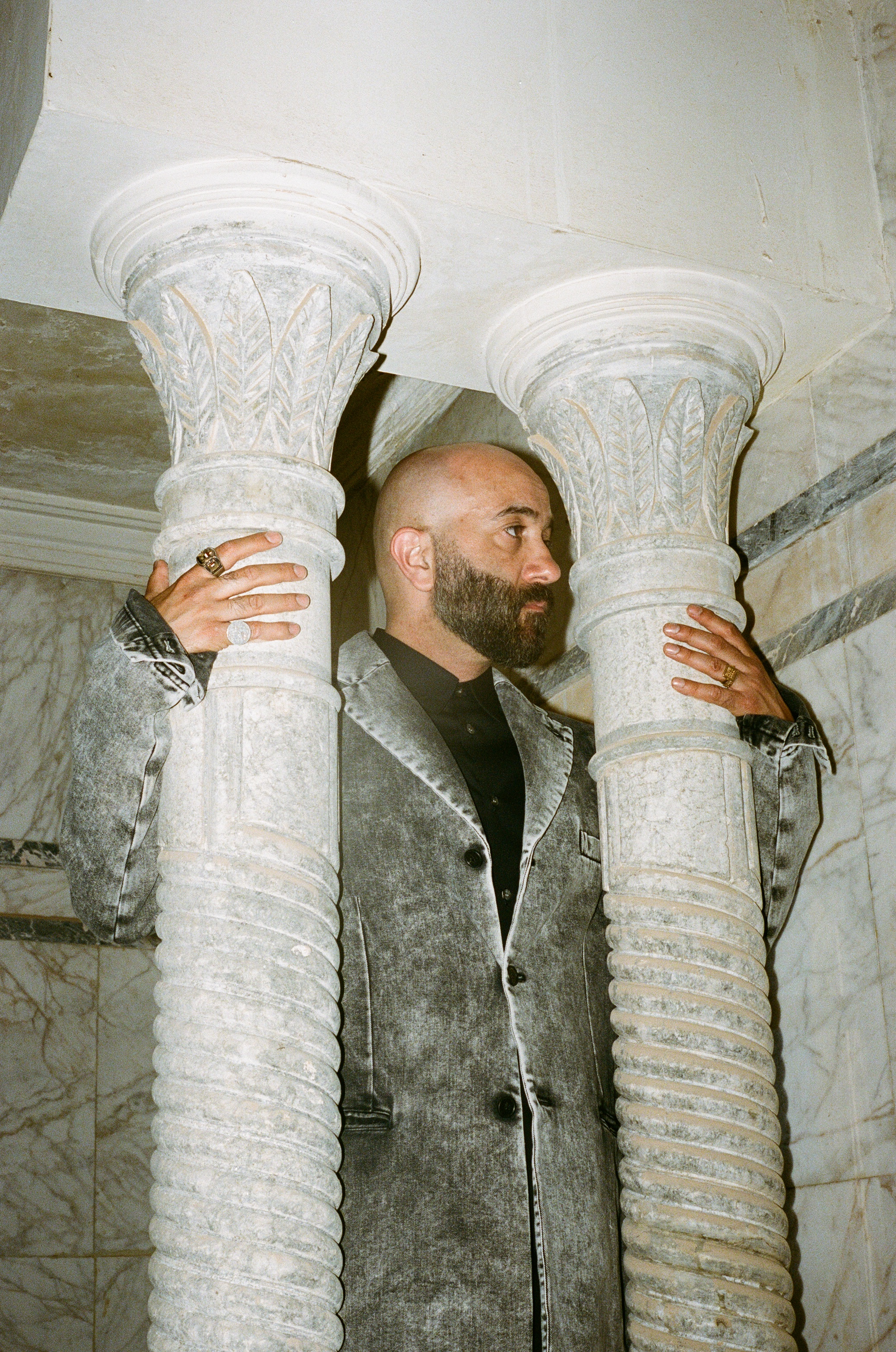
NARCY in Babylon, Iraq.

Yassin Alsalman, (Arabic: ياسين السلمان), better known by his stage name Narcy (formerly The Narcicyst), is an Iraqi-Canadian rapper, author, university instructor and actor. He currently resides in Montreal, Quebec, Canada. He is the founder of Wearethemedium and the co-founder of Montreal’s Old Port cultural hub Maktaba Bookshop, alongside Sundus Abdul-Hadi.

== Biography ==
Alsalman's parents are originally from Basra, Iraq, but emigrated to the United Arab Emirates (UAE) in the 1970s. Yassin was born in Dubai in 1982. In 1987, at the age of five, he and his family moved to Montreal, Quebec, Canada. Yassin spent much of his youth moving back and forth between Canada and the UAE, spending his high school years receiving an education in Dubai.

== Career ==
=== Music ===
In 2000 Yassin moved back to Montreal and started working on his music production in a local recording studio. He has released ten albums and EPs as a solo artist and collaborated with Mashrou' Leila, A Tribe Called Red, Yasiin Bey.

Released in November 2024, NARCY's newest project, To Be An (Arab) (TBA(A)), explores identity, storytelling, and medium. The double LP follows an emotional man in artificial times, guided by an AI therapy bot (DJ Nooriyah). It was produced by Alsalman, Thanks Joey, Sandhill, Nicholas Craven, and more.

Narcy's album, 2020's Love & Chaos, was made over a five-week period during the coronavirus pandemic.

During a performance at 2019's Sole DXB Festival in Dubai, where he performed alongside Black Star and Wu-Tang, Narcy stated that there "are not many people from Iraq in the rap game in North America, so I take my space with a great sense of responsibility."

On Sept. 8, 2020, musician Todd Rundgren released his new single, "Espionage," a collaboration with Narcy that features his lead vocals.

Narcy's performances and lyrics are often political. In 2017, he joined Jeremy Scahill, Desmond Cole and Naomi Klein for a taping of The Intercept podcast, during which he performed a spoken word poem.

He has also directed many of his own music videos, and those of frequent collaborators. His video for A Tribe Called Red ft Yaasiin Bey's R.E.D. won the 2017 "Video of the Year" at the Juno awards.

=== Acting ===
As an actor, he appeared in the movie City of Life which revolves around life in Dubai in 2009. In the movie, he played the role of Khalfan, a conflicted yet loyal Emirati teenager caught in a class struggle with his best friends. He has also starred in short Gemini-nominated series Verte, a musical short on the Green Line in Montreal's Metro system, directed by his sister Hala Al-Salman. He also is known to act in his music videos, both as Jamal in self-written RISE as well as Jassem in his latest release "Makoo", off World War Free Now!. He also voiced the playable character of Darius I, who speaks Aramaic, in the video game Sid Meier's Civilization V.

=== Academic ===
Since 2011, Alsalman has taught a course at Concordia University, in conjunction with Marc Peters, titled "Hip Hop: Past, Present, and Future". He has also taught a course on seeing current events through the lens of cultural frameworks. These classes are recorded as part of We Are The Medium's flagship podcast and have included guests such as Mochilla, A Tribe Called Red, Chance The Rapper, Lowkey, Dounia, Mashrou' Leila and many more.

=== Literature ===
Narcy had released Diatribe of a Dying Tribe in 2011, a book about the role of hip hop as a voice for Arab youth. It explored the chaotic reality of life in North America, the clash of cultures, the rise of immigrant identity, and the powerful art born from struggle and oppression. It serves as Alsalman’s personal reflection on his first decade as an Iraqi MC in North America. This one-of-a-kind book is a collector’s item, paired with the free collaborative album Fear of an Arab Planet by NARCY, Offendum, Ragtop, and Excentrik.

In October 2020, Alsalman released his first multi-genre collection titled Text Messages or How I Found Myself Time Traveling, published by Haymarket Books. It has been called "an ambitious and bold time capsule capturing the insane times we're living through" by Hasan Minhaj and "a necessary read" by Talib Kweli. In 2015 Alsalman collaborated with renowned artist Ashraf Ghori to create a groundbreaking mixed-media project called World War Free Now which combined music, video, and comics together. A limited edition comic was released as a companion piece to Narcy's album.

== Discography ==
=== Albums ===
Euphrates

- A Bend In The River (2003)
- Stereotypes Incorporated (2004)

The Narcicyst

- Fear of an Arab Planet (2007)
- The Narcicyst (2009)
- Mr. Asthmatic (2010)
- Warchestra (2010) (a Sundus Abdul Hadi album in collaboration with The Narcicyst)

Narcy

- Leap Of Faith EP (2013)
- El Nargisee Project (2014) - All Arabic project
- WeAreTheMedium EP (2014)
- World War Free Now! (2015)
- SPACETIME (2018)
- Love & Chaos (SpaceTime Vol 2) (2020)
- To Be An (Arab) - TBA(A) (2024)

=== Singles ===
- "#Jan25" (2011) – Produced by Sami Matar, this song features Syrian MC Omar Offendum, The Narcicyst, Freeway, Amir Sulaiman & Ayah. The hashtag is an ode to Twitter, which has been credited by many as playing an influential role in the Egyptian revolution.
- "Fly Over Egypt" (2012)
- "Leap of Faith" (EP, 2012)
- "Fake News" (2017)
- "Chobi Bryant" (2017)
- "Time" (2018)
- "Space" (2018)
- "Superhero" (2018)
- "Thoughts and Prayers" (2018)

== Filmography ==
=== Film ===
- City Of Life (2009)
- Verte
- PHATWA
- RISE
- "Makoo" (Music video)

=== Voice Over ===
- Civilization V - King Darius
- The Secret World - Black Pharaoh Zombies

== Publications ==
- Diatribes of a Dying Tribe. Write or Wrong/Paranoid Arab Boy, 2011. OCLC 727946616.
- World War Free Now. Self published, 2015.
- Text Messages or How I Found Myself Time Traveling. Haymarket Books, 2020.

== See also ==
- Arabic hip hop
- List of Iraqi artists
