= Jackie Salloum =

American filmmaker

Jacqueline Reem Salloum
- Other names: Jacqueline Salloum, Jackie Salloum
- Education: Eastern Michigan University, New York University
- Occupations: Filmmaker, visual artist, curator
- Website: jsalloum.com

Jacqueline Reem Salloum is an American artist and filmmaker of Palestinian and Syrian descent. Her multi-media based artwork focuses on documenting histories and memories of people, including her family, that have been fragmented by displacement and exile. Salloum’s film work includes experimental video pieces like Planet of the Arabs, which screened at the Sundance Film Festival. She directed the award winning feature documentary on the Palestinian Hip Hop scene, Slingshot Hip Hop, which premiered at the Sundance film festival. Salloum’s art and video work have been exhibited in solo and group shows in the US and internationally including, Mori Art Museum, Japan; Reina Sofia, Spain; Museum of Contemporary Art Taipei, Taiwan; Institute of Contemporary Arts, London; Palazzo Papesse Centre for Contemporary Art, Sienna, Italy, Wallspace Gallery, New York and Void Gallery, Ireland as well as film festivals; IDFA, New Directors New Films, Tiff kids, DoxBox Syria and Beirut International Film Festival.

== Early life and education ==
Jacqueline Reem Salloum was born and raised in Michigan. She received her MFA from New York University.

== Career ==
Salloum directed and edited Planet of the Arabs (2005), an experimental short film on Hollywood’s negative depiction of Arabs and Muslims through the decades. Inspired by Jack Shaheen’s book, Reel Bad Arabs (2014), the short film was a selection at the Sundance Film Festival and has also been exhibited in art galleries and museums globally. Salloum is the director and editor of the film, Slingshot Hip Hop (2008), the first feature-length documentary about the Palestinian hip hop scene which premiered at the Sundance Film Festival.

In 2017, Salloum was an artist-in-residence at New York University, and taught the class, "Memory Metamorphosis".

Salloum’s art and video work have been exhibited internationally, including in Mori Art Museum, Japan; Reina Sofia, Spain; Museum of Contemporary Art Taipei, Taiwan; Institute of Contemporary Arts, London; Palazzo delle Papesse Centre for Contemporary Art, Sienna, Italy, Wallspace Gallery, New York and Void Gallery, Ireland as well as film festivals; IDFA, New Directors New Films, Tiff kids, DoxBox Syria, and Beirut International Film Festival.
