= Shadia Mansour =

British-Palestinian musical artist (born 1985)

Shadia Mansour شادية منصور
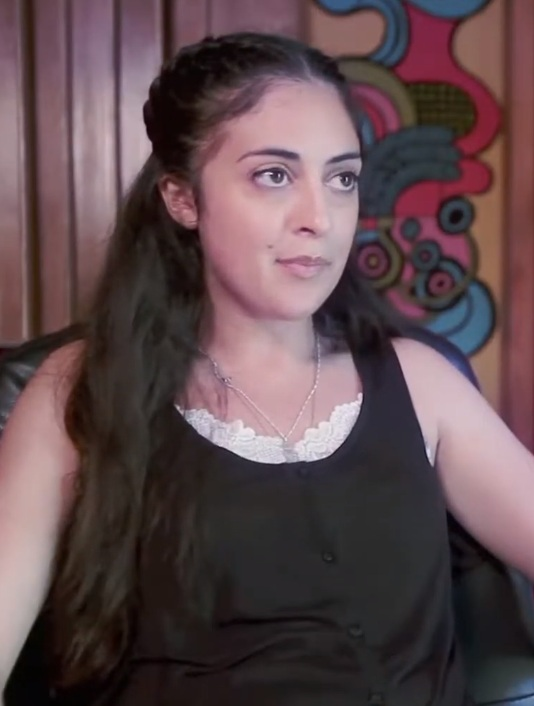
- Mansour in May 2016

Background information
- Also known as: "First Lady of Arabic Hip Hop"
- Born: 1985 (age 40–41); London, England
- Genres: Hip hop
- Occupation: Rapper
- Years active: 2003–present
- Website: shadiamansour.com

Shadia Mansour (Arabic: شادية منصور, romanized: Shādiyah Manṣūr; born 1985), also known as "the First Lady of Arabic Hip Hop", is a British-Palestinian rapper who performs in Arabic and English. Much of her music revolves around Middle Eastern politics.

== Biography ==
=== Early life ===
Mansour was born in London in 1985. Her parents are Christian Palestinians originally from Haifa and Nazareth. She grew up in the UK and spent summers visiting relatives in Haifa and Nazareth, including her cousin, Juliano Mer-Khamis. Influenced by other Arabic performers such as Fairouz, Umm Kulthum and Mohammed Abdel Wahab, Mansour began singing at Palestinian protest rallies as a child and she became known in London's Palestinian community for performing classical Arab songs of protest at an early age. She went on to study performing arts before launching her career as an MC.

=== Career ===
Mansour began rapping in 2003 and has gained recognition in the Middle East, Europe and the United States for her own songs and collaborations with other artists. She performs wearing a traditional Palestinian thobe and has said that she considers herself to be part of a "musical intifada" against the occupation of Palestine, conservatism and oppression of women. Mansour's first single, "Al Kufiya Arabiya" (The Kufiya is Arab), featured rapper M-1 of dead prez and lyrics emphasizing the kufiya's role as a symbol of Arab nationalism. The song was written when Mansour discovered an Israeli made blue-and-white colored Arab scarf with Stars of David on it. Mansour introduced her song on stage in New York: "You can take my falafel and hummus, but don't fucking touch my keffiyeh".

In 2007, Mansour called for Hamas and Fatah to stop fighting. In 2008, Mansour's track "Kulun 'Andun Dababat” (They All Have Tanks) included Tamer and Suhell Nafar from an Israel-based Palestinian hip-hop group DAM; Suhell's lyrics made clear that neither Fatah nor Hamas received his support.

Mansour has recorded music with producer Johnny "Juice" Rosado, formerly of Public Enemy, and was featured on Chuck D's website shemovement.com. She has also collaborated with artists like British Iraqi rapper Lowkey and Narcy.

Mansour has toured with Existence is Resistance, an organization supporting hip-hop shows in Palestine, and is part of the "Arab League" of Hip Hop, a collection of performers who share views on the Middle East.

In 2014, Mansour collaborated with Ana Tijoux on the song "Somos Sur" ("We are South") about the importance of the global resistance movement.

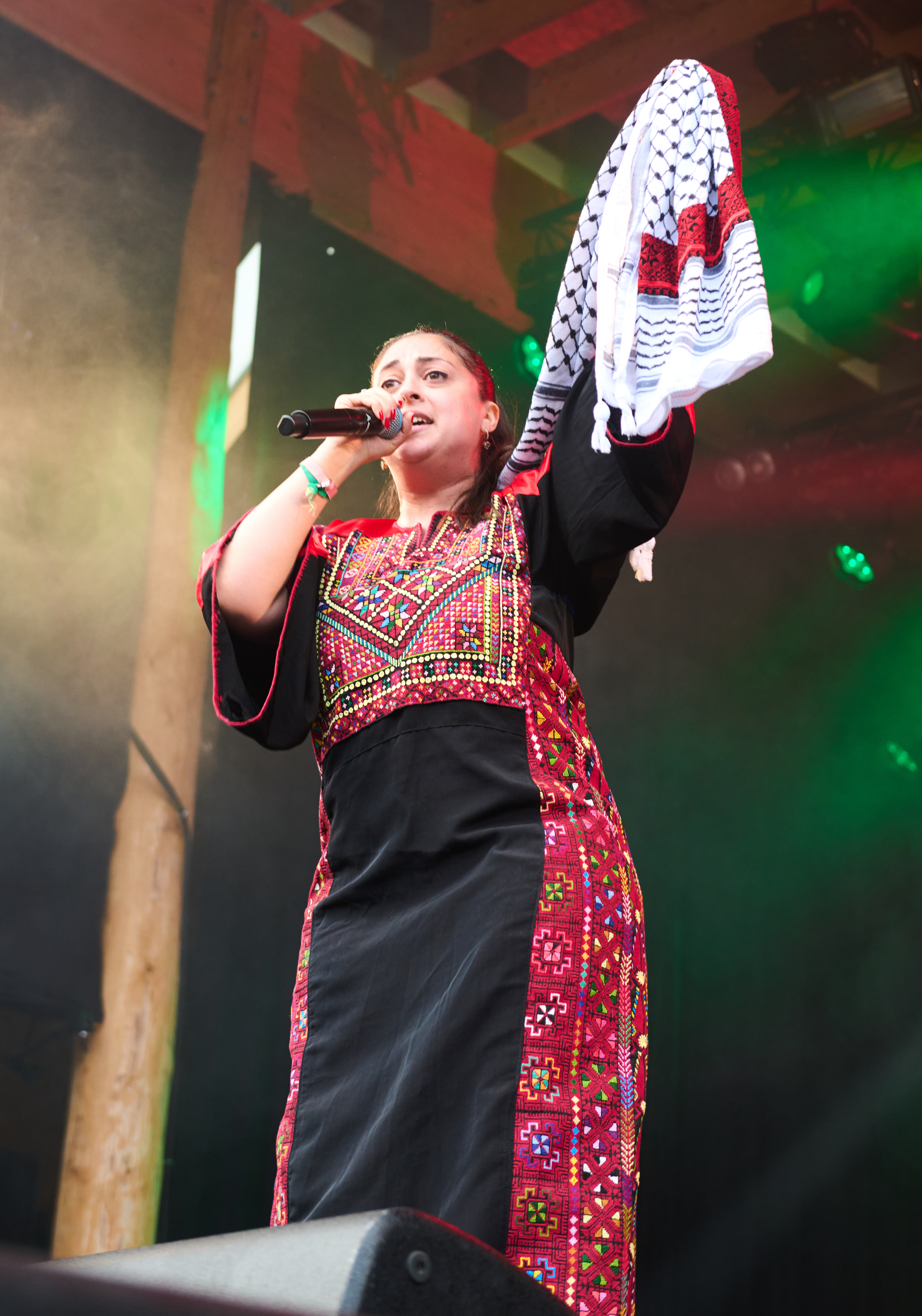
Mansour performing at the 2025 Riddu Riđđu, wearing a thobe and waving a keffiyeh

In 2020, Mansour collaborated with Palestinian Jordanian electronic music and shamstep group 47Soul, as well as Fedzilla - a German-Chilean rapper and MC, on the song "Border Ctrl" about the shared experiences of border violence and colonialism in Palestinians and Latin Americans.

== Political views ==
Mansour's political raps have criticized Israel's occupation of Palestine as well as Israel's role in the Gaza War which began in 2008. Mansour said, "My music sometimes sounds hostile. It's my anger coming out and it's resistance. It's non-violent resistance." Mansour's early work emphatically supported the Palestinian resistance movement with what Rolling Stone called a "hardcore stance on Palestinian nationalism".

Over time her views evolved to appreciate more of the complexity in the region, and her music came to reflect that; Monsour describes that she has become more “realistic” in her lyrics.

While challenging Israel's policies, Mansour also takes a stand against gender stereotyping of women both in hip-hop culture and Palestinian society. She has refused to perform to gender-separated audiences. Mansour's music has been challenged by conservatives within Palestine, and Mansour has addressed that opposition to her music in her lyrics.

== Style ==
She initially tried to change her voice to sound more like male MCs, but over time Mansour has developed her own style as a female MC while rejecting the sexualization of women in hip-hop. Mansour typically performs in a traditional Palestinian gown also known as a thobe, that covers most of her body, and notes that she is "kind of old fashioned."
