= Yarmouk Private University =

Syrian university

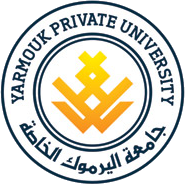
- Type: Private
- Established: 2007
- President: Dr. Adel Safar
- Location: Jabab, Daraa Governorate, Syria
- Website: www.ypu.edu.sy

Yarmouk Private University is a private university located on the international Highway connecting Damascus to Dara’a, 45 km (27.96 miles) away from Damascus, Syria. It lies amidst four governorates, Rif Dimashq, Daraa, Al-Suweida, and Quneitra. It was created under Presidential Decree No. 262 in 2007. Having ensured its possession of the various aspects of accreditation, it was inaugurated by the Minister of Higher Education on 29 October 2008.

== Faculties ==
1. Faculty of Information and Communication Engineering
2. Faculty of Business Administration
3. Faculty of Civil Engineering
4. Faculty of Architecture
5. Faculty of Pharmacy
6. Faculty of Design & Fine Arts
