= Israeli hip-hop =

Music genre

Israeli hip hop
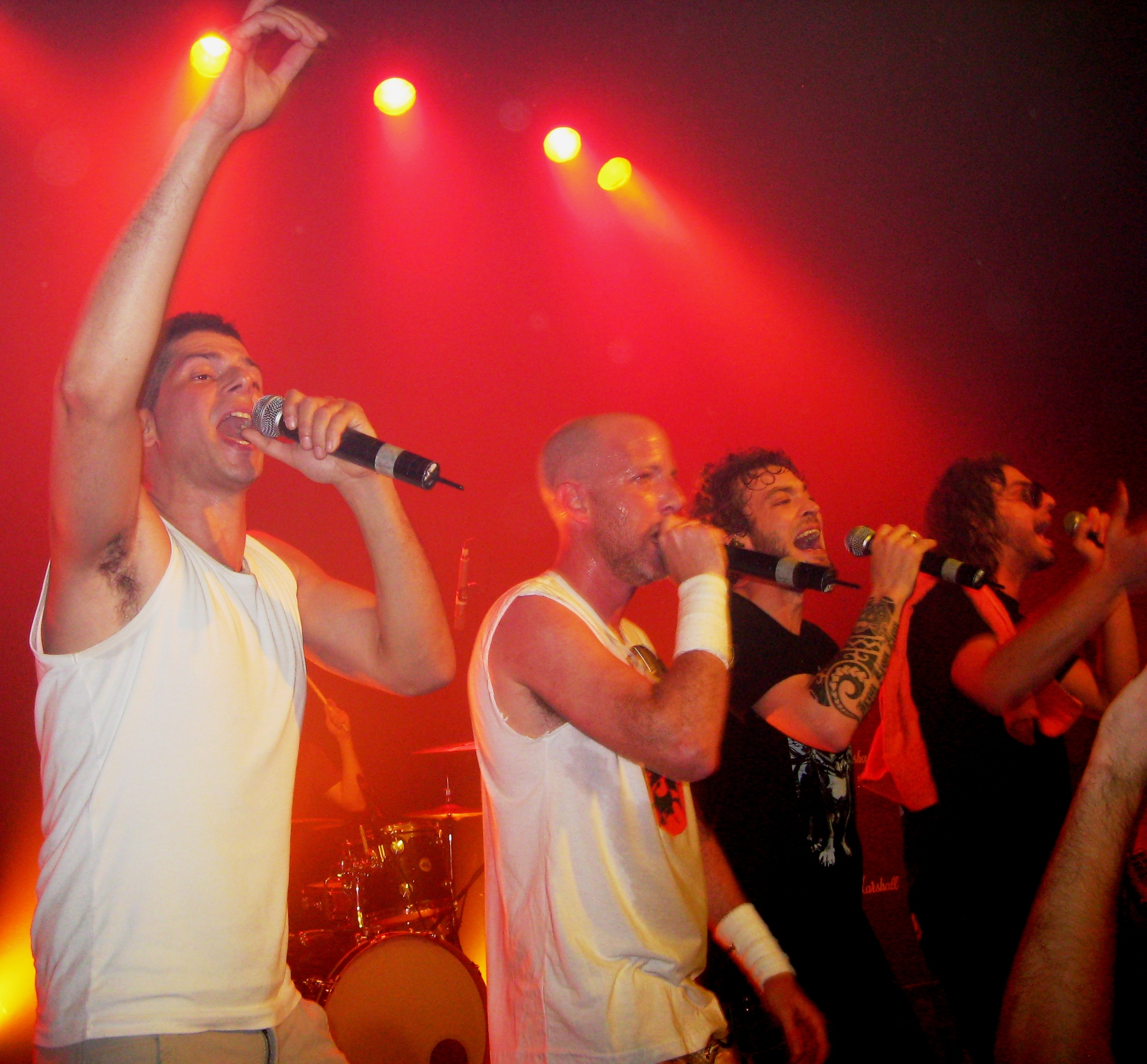
- The first notable Israeli hip hop group, Shabak Samech, began rapping in Hebrew in 1995
- Native name: היפ הופ ישראלי
- Etymology: Derived from the global hip hop culture
- Other names: Israeli rap
- Stylistic origins: Hip hop, Mizrahi music, Middle Eastern music, Caribbean music
- Cultural origins: Mid-1980s to 1990s, Israel

Israeli hip hop refers to hip hop and rap music in Israel. Israeli hip hop artists hold widespread popularity in Israel, and have expanded to international markets including the United States.

Hebrew hip-hop emerged in the mid-1980s, with the genre gaining popularity in Israel during the 1990s along with global hip-hop trends. Yair Nitzani, then a member of the Israeli rock group Tislam, released an old-school hip hop parody album under the name "Hashem Tamid". This early work was influenced by New York's hip hop scene. In 1993, Nigel Haadmor (later known as Yehoshua Sofer) and Yossi Fine produced the album "Humus Metamtem", further establishing the genre in Israel.

A significant milestone in Israeli hip hop was the establishment of the radio show "Esek Shachor" (Black Business) in 1995 by Quami De La Fox (Eyal Freedman) and DJ Liron Teeni on Galgalatz, the Israeli Army's radio station. This show played a mix of Hebrew, Arabic, and English hip hop and became highly popular, significantly influencing the Israeli hip hop scene. Teeni is credited with encouraging artists to rap in Hebrew, thus making the genre more authentic to Israeli culture and accessible to the local audience.

The first notable Israeli hip hop group, Shabak Samech, began rapping in Hebrew in 1995, inspired by the Beastie Boys. While their music was initially met with resistance, the group later experienced success. Israeli hip hop often addresses themes unique to the country's social and political landscape, including the struggles of growing up in Israel, spirituality, and politics.

== History ==
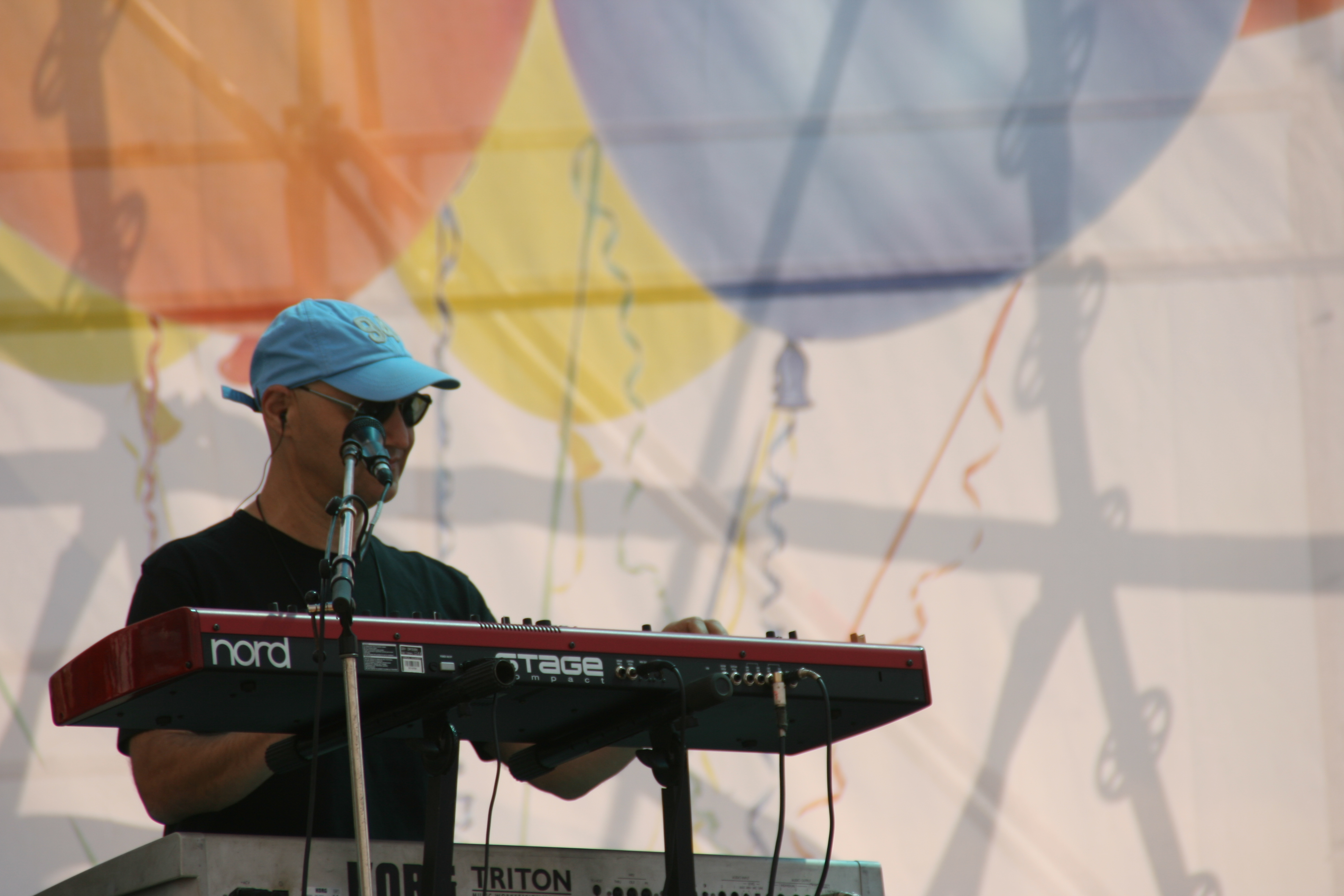
Yair Nitzani

Although Native Hebrew hip hop gained popularity only during the 1990s, stemming from global influences, traces of it could be found during the mid-1980s. Yair Nitzani, then a member of the Israeli rock group, "Tislam", released an old school hip hop parody album under the name "Hashem Tamid".

In 1995, the Beastie Boys toured Israel and were interviewed by Quami de la Fox (Eyal Freedman) on Galgalatz, the Israeli Army's radio station and most popular radio station of that time. After the interview, Quami de la Fox created a Hebrew parody of their song “So What’cha Want” to promote their tour in Israel. Later that year Quami de la Fox collaborated with DJ Liron Teeni, also a host on the Galgalatz station, to produce Esek Shachor (Black Business) – the first all hip hop radio show in Israel. Playing a mix of Hebrew, Arabic and English hip hop, by 2000 Esek Shachor “was the most popular program on Galgalatz and today remains a leader in Israel's hip-hop world.”

Popular rock band Shabak Samech is credited with being the first Israeli hip hop group, and began rapping in Hebrew in 1995. Influenced by the Beastie Boys, their lyrics did not have any specific political or social message and were mostly party lyrics. Israeli listeners initially rejected their music. Chemi Arzi, one of the band members, recalls, “‘They said you just can't rap in Hebrew; it doesn't sound good.’” Shabak Samech continued to produce Hebrew-language rap songs in efforts to promote this new style of Hebrew and Mediterranean hip hop. The band was initially marginalized due to the belief of Israeli DJs that their audiences would be lost, but they eventually reached success.

While Israeli hip hop may be seem to have common underlying themes with US hip hop and they share the main elements of hip hop, mainstream hip hop in Israel tends to deal mainly with the situation in the country, spirituality, or politics. Israeli rappers talk about more personal issues such as the struggles of growing up in Israel. Most Jewish Rappers tends to disregard the political situation between Arabs and Jews, yet they refer frequently to the economic situations in the country. Since 2001, with the rising of new Hip Hop acts, most issues are dealing with creation, essence of Hip Hop, street culture, drugs, hedonism, etc.

== Hip hop for Ethiopian-Israeli youth ==
Since the 1990s, Ethiopian-Israeli teenagers used the rising reggae and hip hop scenes as a means of forming a community and a sense of belonging. Tel Aviv nightclubs proved to be places of social gathering for Ethiopian-Israeli teenagers, giving them a space to gather and form a collective identity. Teenagers and young adults were able to identify with the black struggle of the music and felt reggae and rap reflected their own experiences. Through identification with historically black American musical styles, Anthropologist Malka Shabtay writes,

Young Ethiopians living in Israel have... transformed their collective and personal experiences of alienation, both real and imagined, into an ideology identifying themselves as the blacks in Israeli society and attributing the relatively poor achievements of Ethiopians and their sense of inferiority and failure to racism. Their language of disappointment, disillusionment and hostility is addressed to those they hold responsible for their situation. They believe Israelis to be prejudiced towards them and see in them the reason that their chances of achieving integration are low: ‘You feel betrayed and are called ‘n-gger’. You made it to Israel and it doesn't work.’

Identification with the African-American struggle, mainly through music, formed a sense of community and identity among Ethiopian-Israeli teenagers. “Their search for a home is temporarily satisfied by reggae and rap... This encounter with black musical genres is a matter not only of musical taste, but of self-image and image in the eyes of others.” Ethiopian-Israeli reggae and rap, reflecting struggles and racism of daily life of these teenagers, provides a sense of community and identification among Ethiopian-Israeli youth. Ethiopian Israeli hip-hop groups, including artists such as Cafe Shachor Hazak, Axum, and Jeremy Cool Habash, have become very popular amongst Israelis, and have been growing in popularity as Ethiopian Jews integrate into mainstream Israeli society.

Strong Black Coffee ("Café Shahor Hazak"; קפה שחור חזק) is an Ethiopian-Israeli hip hop duo. The duo were a nominee for the 2015 MTV Europe Music Awards Best Israeli Act award.

== Israeli rappers ==
=== Hadag Nachash ===
Hadag Nachash (Hebrew: "הַדָּג נָחָשׁ", English: "The Snake Fish”, IPA: /haˈdag naˈχaʃ/) formed in 1996 was one of the first rap groups to hit the mainstream in Israel. A sprouting Palestinian scene grew alongside them. Their sound consists of a mixture of Funk, Jazz, world music and western pop. They have been compared frequently to the American hip hop group The Roots since they use a live band instead of a DJ for their backup music. In contrast to the patriotic "Zionist" hip-hop of artists like Subliminal (see below), Hadag Nachash's music is often satirical and sometimes comes from a left-wing perspective. Two examples for that would be their songs "Gabi & Debi" (Hebrew) which spoofs right-wing Zionist rap music, and "Little man" (English) depicting the despair from the religious collisions in the city of Jerusalem".

=== Subliminal ===
Kobi Shimoni (Hebrew: "קוֹבִּי שִׁמְעוֹנִי", IPA: /ˈkobi ʃimˈʔoni/), more commonly known as Subliminal (Hebrew: "סאבלימינל", IPA: /sabˈliminal/), is among the most popular rappers in Israel. He has been described as "Israel's Eminem". The album “Ha'Or Ve'HaTzel” (Hebrew: "הָאוֹר וְהַצֵּל", English: "The light and the shadow", IPA: /ha'ʔoʁ veha'tsel/) with partner The Shadow (Hebrew: "הַצֵּל", pronounced "Ha'tzel", IPA: /ha'tsel/) has sold 80,000 Records in Israel which is a double Platinum Album. Subliminal was born in Tel Aviv, Israel. He started performing music at age 12, and at age 15 met Yoav Eliasi (Hebrew: "יוֹאָב אֶלְיָאסִי", IPA: /jo'ʔav ʔel'jasi/)' , who would later become his performing partner under the name "The Shadow". The two quickly became friends as a result of their mutual love of hip-hop. In 1995 the two began performing in Israeli clubs wearing baggy clothes and gold chains. They quickly developed a following among the nation's youth, and put out their first album, "Ha'Or m'Zion" (Hebrew: "הָאוֹר מִצִּיּוֹן", English: "The light from Zion", IPA: /ha'ʔoʁ mitsi'jon/). After the outbreak of the violent uprising in 2000 they wrote patriotic songs. They became known as creators of "Zionist hip-hop". In further contrast to the generally rebellious, "outlaw" nature of most hip-hop, they also praise army service and eschew drugs and smoking. With occasional Arabic lyrics and songs like "Peace in the Middle East" (Hebrew: "שָׁלוֹם בַּמִּזְרָח הַתִּיכוֹן", pronounced "Shalom Ba'Mizrach Ha'Tichon", IPA: /ʃa'lom bamiz'ʁaχ hati'χon/). Subliminal and The Shadow also helped discover the Palestinian rapper Tamer Nafar (Arabic: "تَمِر نَفَر", IPA: /'tamir 'nafar/); they collaborated but eventually fell out over political differences. The bitter end of their musical relationship is chronicled in the documentary Channels of Rage (Hebrew: "עֲרוּצִים שֶׁל זַעַם", IPA: /ʔʁu'tsim 'ʃel 'zaʔam/).

=== SHI 360 ===
Shai Haddad (Hebrew: "שַׁי חֲדַד", IPA: /'ʃaj χa'dad/) was born in Haifa, Israel and then moved to Montreal, Canada when he was eleven. He was very resistant to the move and didn't like the change. When attending a public school he was faced with a lot of Antisemitism. He also perceived a lot of friction within the local Jewish community. He was seen as an outcast to them because his friends were mostly black and Hispanic. The Canadian hip-hop scene helped jump-start his rap career. He would go to open mic nights, and had recorded his first vinyl single, "Linguistiks", through his own label, IntelektMusik, in Montreal. In 1996 Haddad returned to Israel to pursue his rap career. This time he went under the name SHI 360 (Hebrew: "שַׁי 360"). SHI stands for Supreme Hebrew Intelekt, and 360 represents his return to Israel from Canada. SHI 360's lyrics reflect political and social themes as opposed to the "feel-good" pop that dominates the Israeli radio. In the song “Shvor Ta'Dmama” (Hebrew: "שׁבוֹר ת'דממה", English: "Break the silence", IPA: /'ʃvoʁ tadma'ma/) he talks to kids speaking up about abuse in their household. He considers himself a conscious MC. SHI 360 hopes to change the view on how radio is supposed to sound in Israel.

After a few years rapping, he met Israeli rapper Subliminal, who at the time was known as “Caveman”. Haddad suggested the name "Subliminal", and Subliminal took that name as his stage name. Subliminal and David Levy started the T.A.C.T. Entertainment group.

=== DAM ===
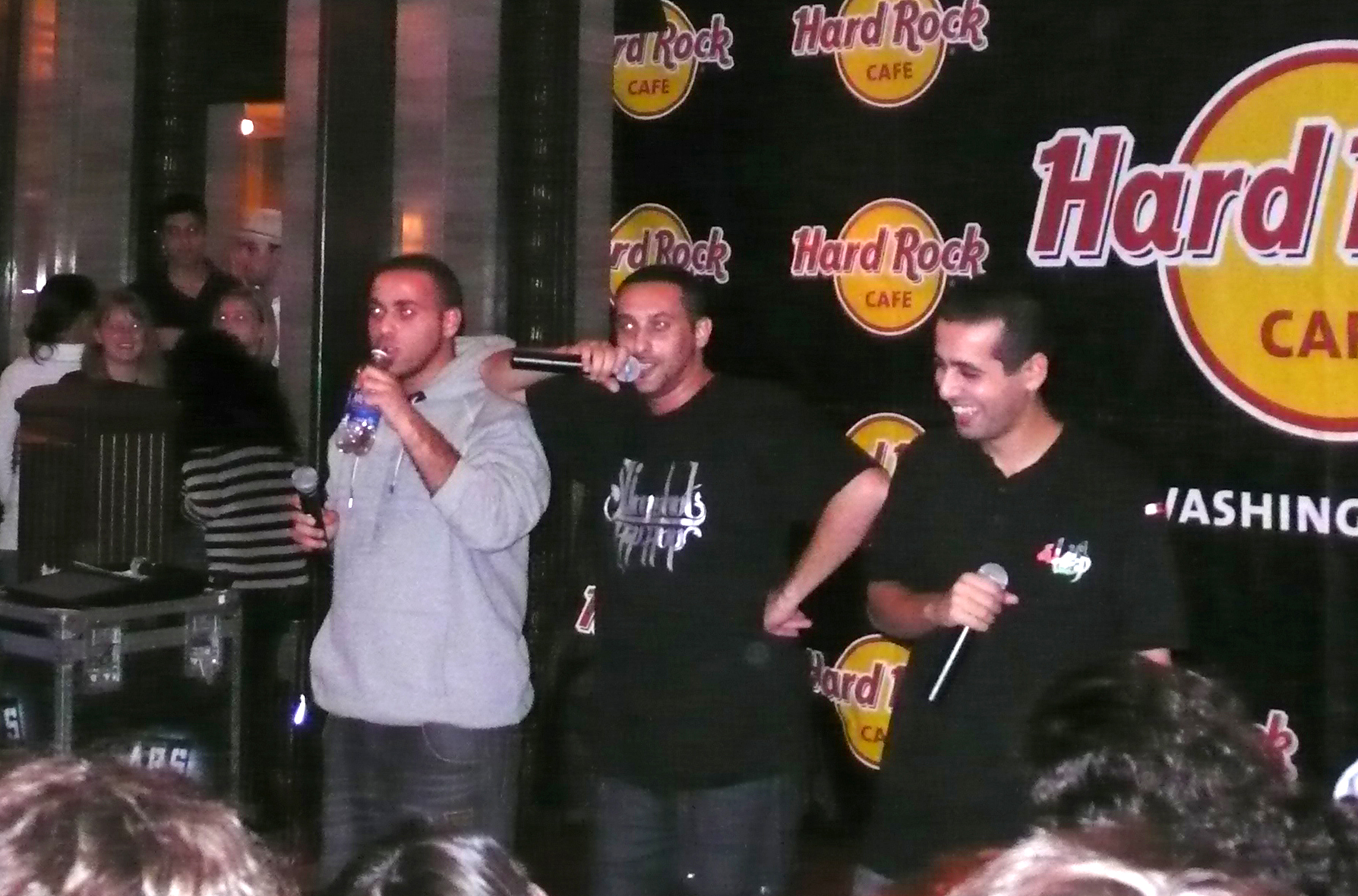
DAM performing in Washington D.C.

Though many Jewish Israeli rappers are present in the country's pop culture, fewer Palestinian hip-hop groups have surfaced, though one has gained widespread popularity. The group's name, DAM, is the Arabic verb for "to last forever/eternity" (دام) and the Hebrew word for "blood" (דם), but can also be an acronym for "Da Arabian MCs." DAM could be argued to be the polar opposite of Subliminal’s right-wing stance. Formed in 1998, DAM is noted as the first Arab-Israeli hip-hop group and consists of three Palestinian men who hold Israeli citizenship as well: Tamer Nafer, his brother Suhell, and a friend, Mahmoud Jreri. Though the rappers mostly sing in Arabic, they do write songs in Hebrew and English as well, to ensure that they reach all of their intended audiences. The content of their songs is largely focused on the many conflicts existent between Israel and the Palestinians, including the issue of Palestinians feeling like second-class citizens of the country. DAM often challenges Zionism with their lyrics and accuses the Israeli government of racism and inequality. Many of their songs demand treatment equal to that offered to the Jewish citizens of Israel. According to lead rapper Nafer, “our message is one of humanity- but it's also political- we make protest music.” DAM's first single of 2001, “Meen Erhabe?” (or “Who's the Terrorist?”) was not even released by an official recording label, but was still downloaded from online by over one million visitors. Their latest rap single, “Born Here,” is written and performed in Hebrew to further expand their audience. Nafar has also stated that the reasoning for the transition to Hebrew lyrics is to be able to transmit the messages of the injustices to the Israelis very clearly. Nafar has said that his position is to replace politicians; “Politicians don't talk to our generation. But politics is the way of our life, so I'm bringing the way of our life in their language.” In November 2006, DAM ultimately released an official album, titled “Dedication.”

=== Sagol 59 ===
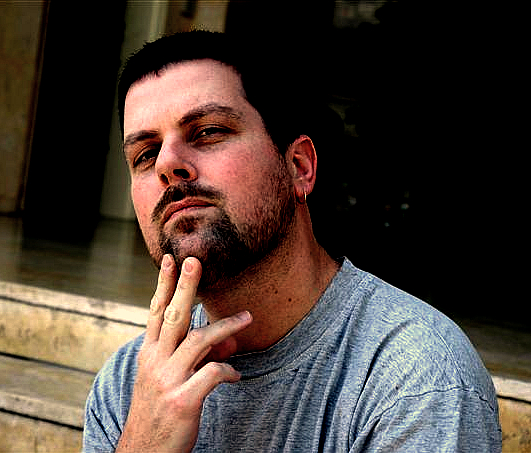
Sagol 59

Sagol 59 (Born Khen Rotem, October 1, 1968) is a Jerusalem based hip-hop MC. Raised on a Kibbutz in Israel. After his required 3-year stint in the Israeli Defense Forces, Sagol turned to music, beginning his career in blues, funk and rock before moving on to hip hop in the Mid 1990s. Shortly after, he relocated to Jerusalem. Sagol was picked up by the city's seminal (and now defunct) indie label, Fact Records. He was later signed to major label NMC Records.

Sagol has released five full-length albums. Sagol has worked with artists from many musical backgrounds. Sagol has played shows in Israel, the United States and Europe. Sagol has helped shape Israel’s rap scene. Sagol has become one of the leading artists, in Israel’s rap scene.

Within the last decade, Sagol has participated in many events alongside Palestinian and Arab musicians, and has performed alongside many well-known artists and overseas: Matisyahu, DJ Spooky, Kenny Mohammed The Human Orchestra, Remedy, Killah Priest, Sole of Anticon, Spearhead's Michael Franti, Yitz Jordan aka Y-Love, Taskforce, and Israeli artists such as Hadag Nachash, Coolooloosh, Mook-e, Teapacks, Yossi Fine and many others.

In 2001 he received critical praise for his groundbreaking collaboration “Summit Meeting"(feat. Tamer Nafar of DAM & Shaanan Streett of Hadag Nachash), the first-ever collaborative recording featuring both Israeli and Palestinian MCs. He regularly hosts the Corner Prophets series, a cultural initiative meant to unite the diverse cultural communities located in Jerusalem through a shared interest in hip-hop. By working with Corner Prophets, Sagol's goal is to inspire a new generation of Israelis and Palestinians that turn to art, not violence, as a means to find a common ground.

== Notable Israeli hip hop crews and rappers ==
- Fishi Ha-Gadol
- Strong Black Coffee
- Marvin Casey
- Itay Lukach
- Ron Nesher
- Shabak Samech

== See also ==
- Music of Israel
- Miri Ben-Ari
- Palestinian hip hop
