= Gultosh =

Gultosh was an all-Jewish village located near the city of Gondar, in Ethiopia. Gultosh was located about 10 kilometers east of Gondar City's center, across the Angereb River and Megech River. Gultush's topography is mountainous in a way that limits vehicle access. The village had approximately 90 households at the end of the 1970s. The original inhabitants left for Israel in the 1980s, the last of whom stayed until 1986. Gultosh has been repopulated by locals from nearby villages.

The village was situated in a valley between mountains and relied on small-scale agriculture, with tef, wheat, and barley being among the main crops.

The Israeli rappaper Jeremy Cool Habash was born in Gultosh.
