= Fishi Ha-Gadol =

Israeli rapper (born 1977)

Fishi Ha-Gadol פישי הגדול
- Born: Adam Ben Lavi; 1977 (age 48–49)
- Origin: Tel-Aviv, Israel
- Genres: Israeli hip hop
- Occupations: Rapper; record producer
- Instrument: vocals
- Years active: 1993–present

Adam Levinzon, (born in 1977 in Tel-Aviv, Israel), better known by his stage name, "The Big Fishi" (Fishy HaGadol, Fishi Hagadol - פישי הגדול) and "Adam Ben-Lavi," is an Israeli music producer and rapper.

== Childhood ==
Adam was born and raised in Tel-Aviv. When young, he became interested in reggae music. His nickname "Fishi" came from his neighborhood friends, because he was thin, wore glasses and looked like the character "Fishenzon" from the movie Alex Holeh Ahavah.

== Career ==
Levinson was a popular rapper in the 1990s and early 2000s. His early career was influenced by the reggae singer, Nigel the Admor (Yehoshua Sofer). Adam became famous as a rapper after he participated in the big hit of the band Shabak Samech in 1997, blow in the trumpet, from the album, in a wrapper of a candy. In 1999, he recorded another hit with Kobi Oz and the band Teapacks, Diana, and the same year released his debut album, Fishi Hagadol, through the publisher Hed Arzi.

== Recent years ==
In 2000, he released his second album, Hasandak (The Godfather), also with Hed Arzi. In 2005, he returned to religion and changed his name to Adam Yosef Ben Lavi. In 2006, he recorded, with the electro producer, Skazi, the hit song Hit & Run.

From 2007, Adam continued producing music, helped youth to leave the streets to create music, and became involved with writing and development. Adam is still putting on shows.

He married in 2012.

== Albums ==
- Fishi Hagadol (1999)
- Hasandak (2000)
- Hohmat Rehov (2004)
- Hahaii'm Bablock (2010)
