= List of Gondarine churches =

Tradition states that Gondar, the capital of the Ethiopian Empire, had 44 Orthodox Tewahedo churches. There are fewer churches in this list – Stuart Munro-Hay provides evidence that shows the number was meant to be taken symbolically, rather than literally – and not all of them are, properly speaking, in Gondar.

Name	Date founded (if known)	Comments
Abba Antons ("Father Anthony")	1715	Located west of Gondar. Built under Emperor Yostos reign. Original paintings removed in 1933 by Marcel Griaule, now on display at the Musée de l'Homme.
Abajale Tekle Haymanot		Original church built during reign of Emperor Fasilides, and later underwent restoration under Emperor Tekle Haymanot II. The church is dedicated to Saint Tekle Haymanot.
Abhorra Giyorgis		Located 3 kilometers south of Gondar
Abyegzi		Original church founded by an aristocrat in the reign of Tekle Haymanot II. Present structure is a round church
Adababay Iyasus		Located in Adababay, the market place outside the southern gates of the Royal Enclosure. Founded by Emperor Fasilides.
Adababay Tekle Haymanot		Located in Adababay. Founded by Emperor Iyasus I
Asasame Qeddus Mikael		Located inside the Royal Enclosure. Dedicated by Emperor Dawit II.
Ba'eta Maryam	1775	Founded by Tekle Haymanot II. Was among the richest churches in Gondar until it was burnt to the ground in the sack of Gondar by Tewodros II in 1866. Rebuilt in the late 1920s.
Qeddus Qirqos		Located on southeast end of Adababay, and named after the child martyr Quiricus of Tarsus. Original church founded by Emperor Tekle Haymanot II
Dafacha Kidane Mehret		"Convent of Mercy" Founded by Bakaffa; by 1973 this church was in ruins
Debre Berhan Selassie	1693	Best known of the churches of Gondar for its interior paintings. Avoided destruction by the Mahdists in 1888, this church "offers some idea of what other treasures might be in Gonder today had it not been for the Mahdist War."
Debre Metmaq Mariyam		Founded by Emperor Tekle Giyorgis in late 18th century.
Dibabo		Also known as the "Church of the Apostles of Deva"
Elfin Giyorgis		Located inside the Royal Enclosure. Constructed by Emperor Fasilides.
Ewostatewos		Named for the Ethiopian saint. Founded by Bakaffa
Egziabeher Ab		Founded by Emperor Fasilides, but destroyed in the Mahdist sack of Gondar. According to Solomon Getahun, the site is now occupied by a mosque built during the reign of Emperor Menelik II.
Fit Qeddus Mikael		Old church of St Michael, burned down in 1725. A modern round church stands on this site, although an old archway from the original church still stands
The Four Saints		Also known as the church of the Four Animals. Now vanished, but the site is marked by a fig tree.
Gemjabet Mariyam		Located inside the Royal Enclosure. Constructed by Emperor Fasilides.
St. George of Damot		Burned down in 1695
Hamara Noh ("Noah's Ark")	1710	Also known as Selestu Mit. Founded by Emperor Tewoflos. Mentioned numerous times in the 18th century, this church since vanished without a visible trace.
Hawaryat		By 1938, all that remained were traces of the enclosure wall and a mound of stones.
St. John of Guara		Perhaps founded by one of the relatives of Empress Mentewab
Lideta Mariyam ("Birth of the Virgin Mary")	1713	The first of two churches constructed under Emperor Yostos.
Mariyam Seyon		Munro-Hay doubts this church ever existed
Mariyam Sihor		Church southwest of Gondar
Medhane Alem		Seat of the Ethiopian Orthodox bishop of Gondar
St. Mikael of Aira		Unidentified
St. Mikael of Belageo		Also known as Bilajig Mikael
Peter and Paul		Unidentified
Qaha Iyasus church		May have existed before the founding of Gondar.
Qeddus Abbo		Also known as Fit Abbo. First church built by Emperor Fasilides in Gondar.
Qeddus Fasilides		Munro-Hay believes this "was actually nothing other than a re-use of the pavilion in the lake usually called the Bath of Fasiladas."
Qeddus Gabrael		Original church said to have been built by Emperor Fasilides; location now occupied by a large square church. Solomon Getahun notes this was the seat of the Abuna, and served as a refuge for asylum-seekers. The Abuna moved his residence to Medhane Alem (see above) during the Italian occupation.
Qeddus Rafael	1722	Adjacent to the Royal Enclosure. Burned during unrest in Iyasus II's reign; present structure a new building
Qeddus Yohannes		Built by Ras Wolde Leul during the reign of Iyasu II, currently all that remains of this structure is the stone-built pedestal. Reconstruction planned.
St Simeon of Tzaamdi		Munro-Hay suggests two different churches this might be: either a church of Samuel southwest of Gondar, or the church of "Tzemba" located on the Lesser Angereb
Wolleka Ba'ata		Located three kilometers north of Gondar
Wrangeb Giyorgis		May have existed before founding of Gondar
Yohannes Wolde Nagwadgwad		Founded by Emperor Tekle Haymanot II, dedicated to Saint John the Evangelist.
