= Gondar =

City in Amhara Region, Ethiopia

Gondar ጎንደር Gonder
- City and woreda
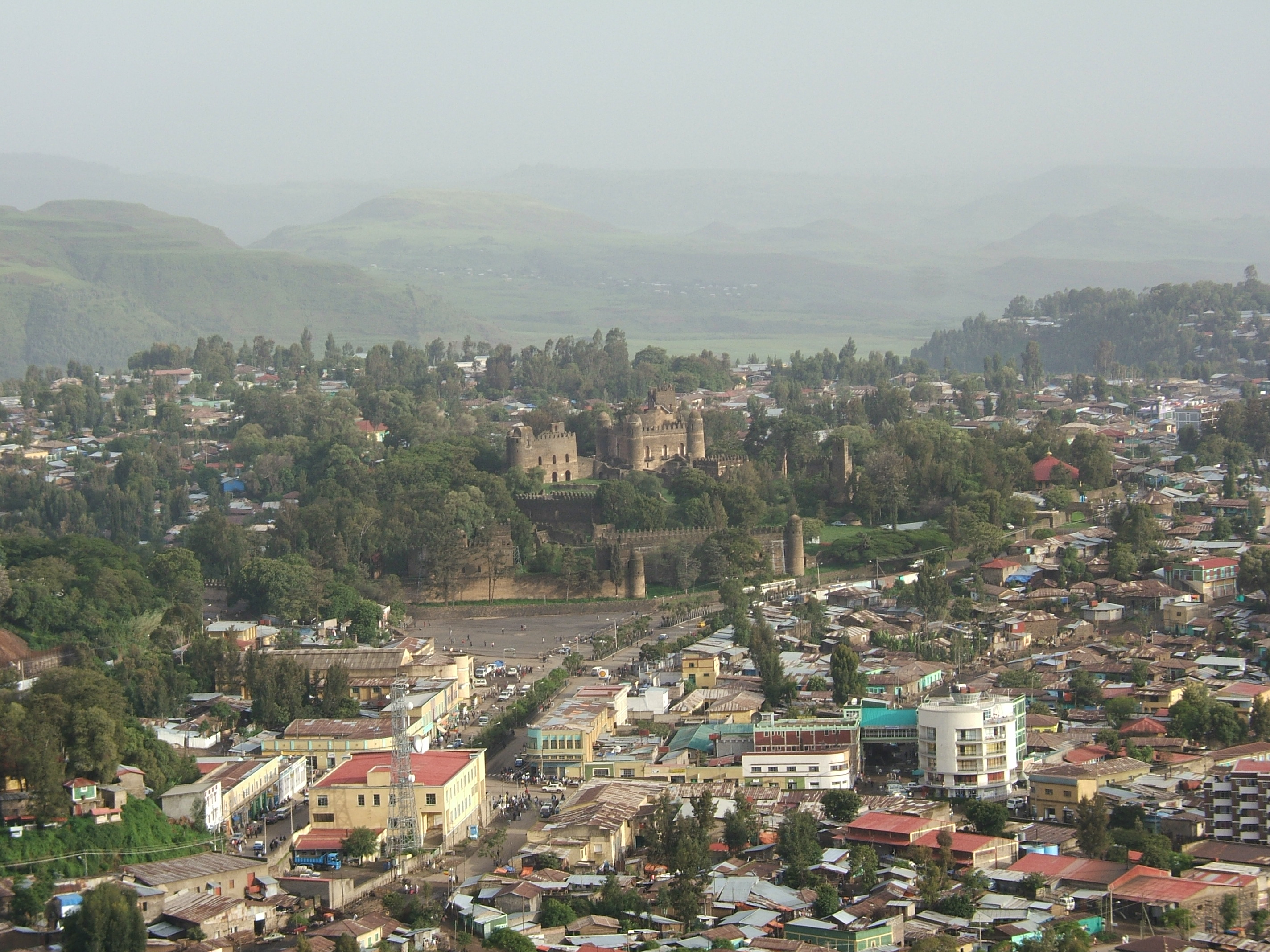
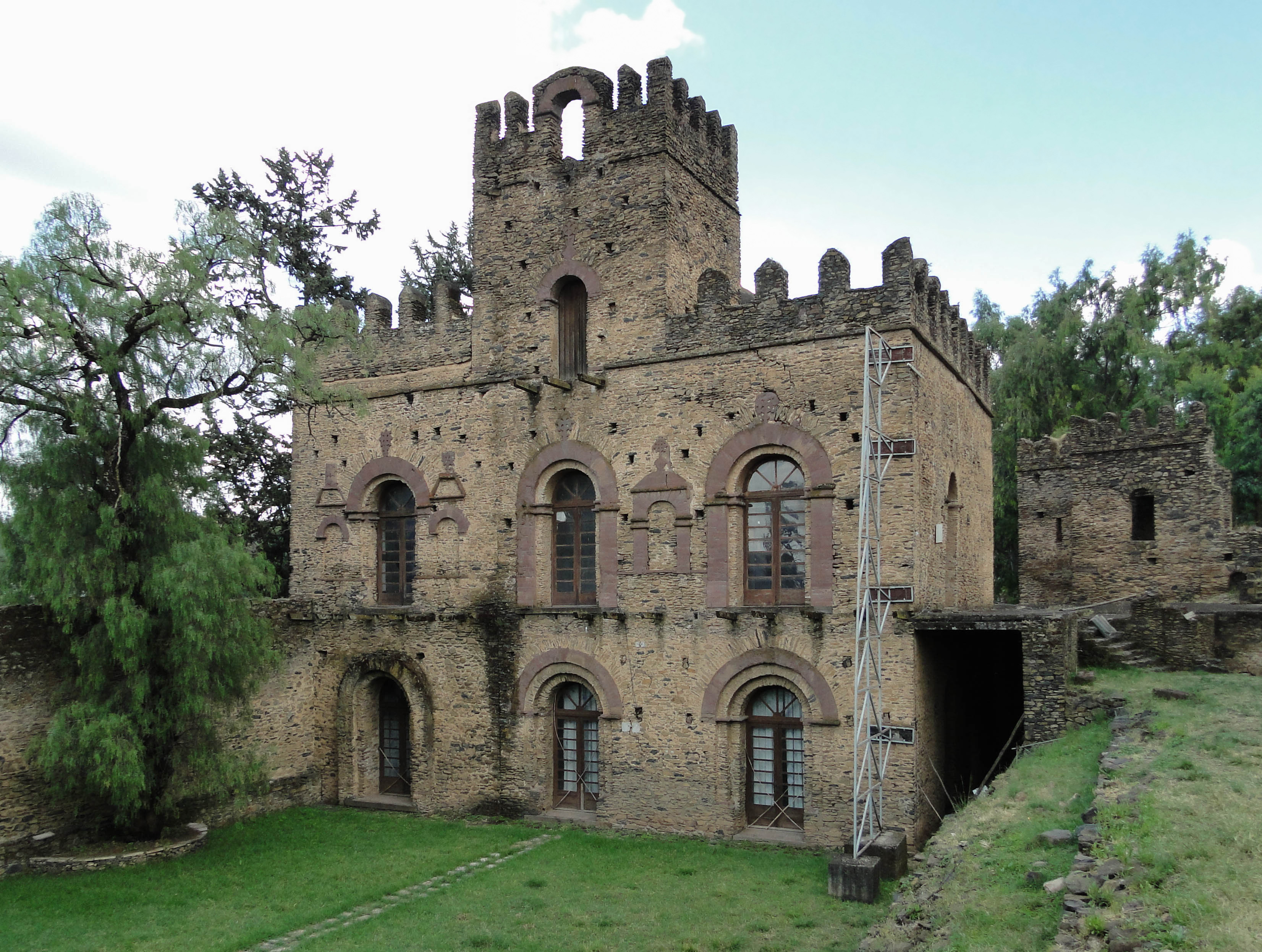
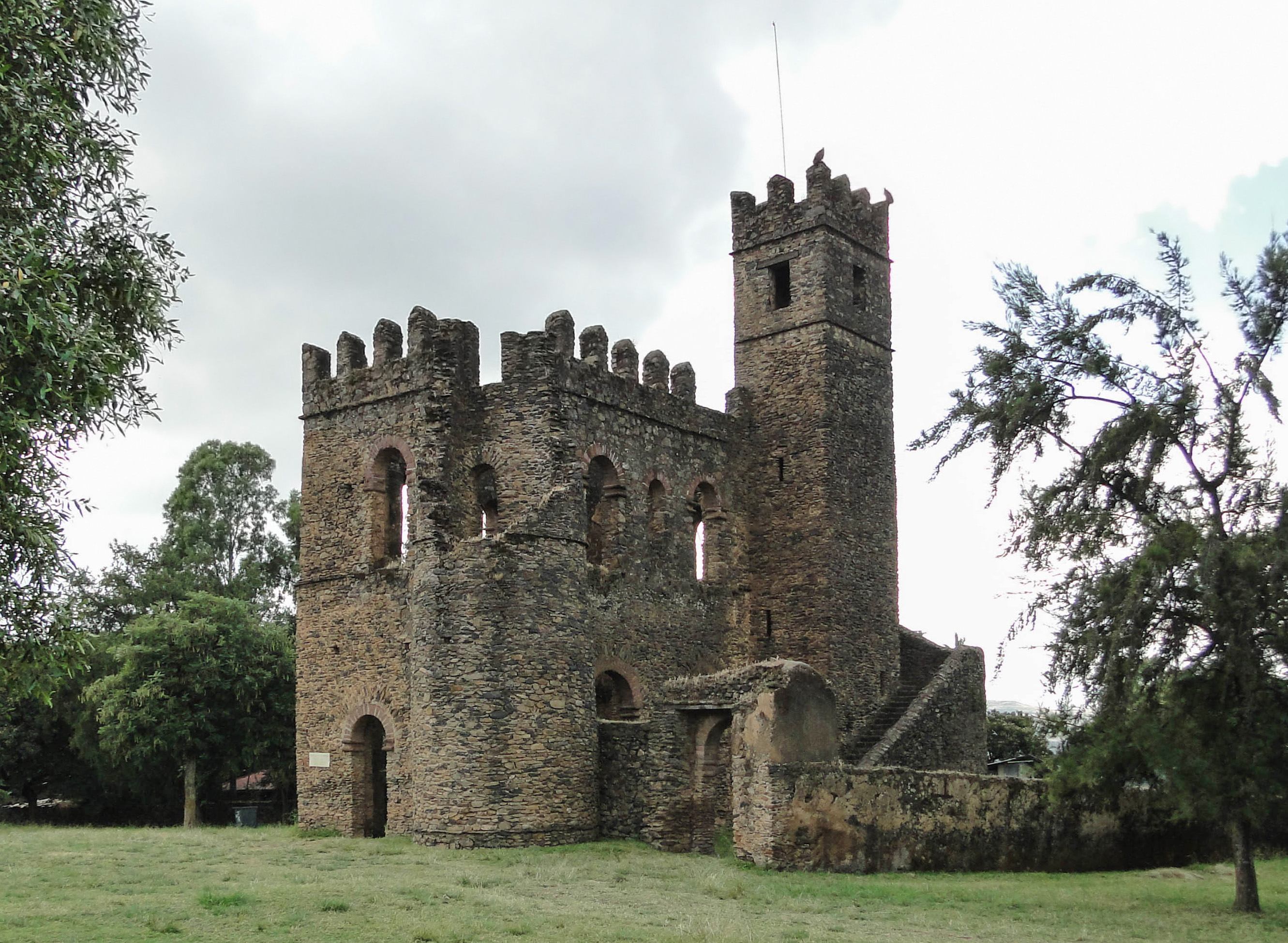
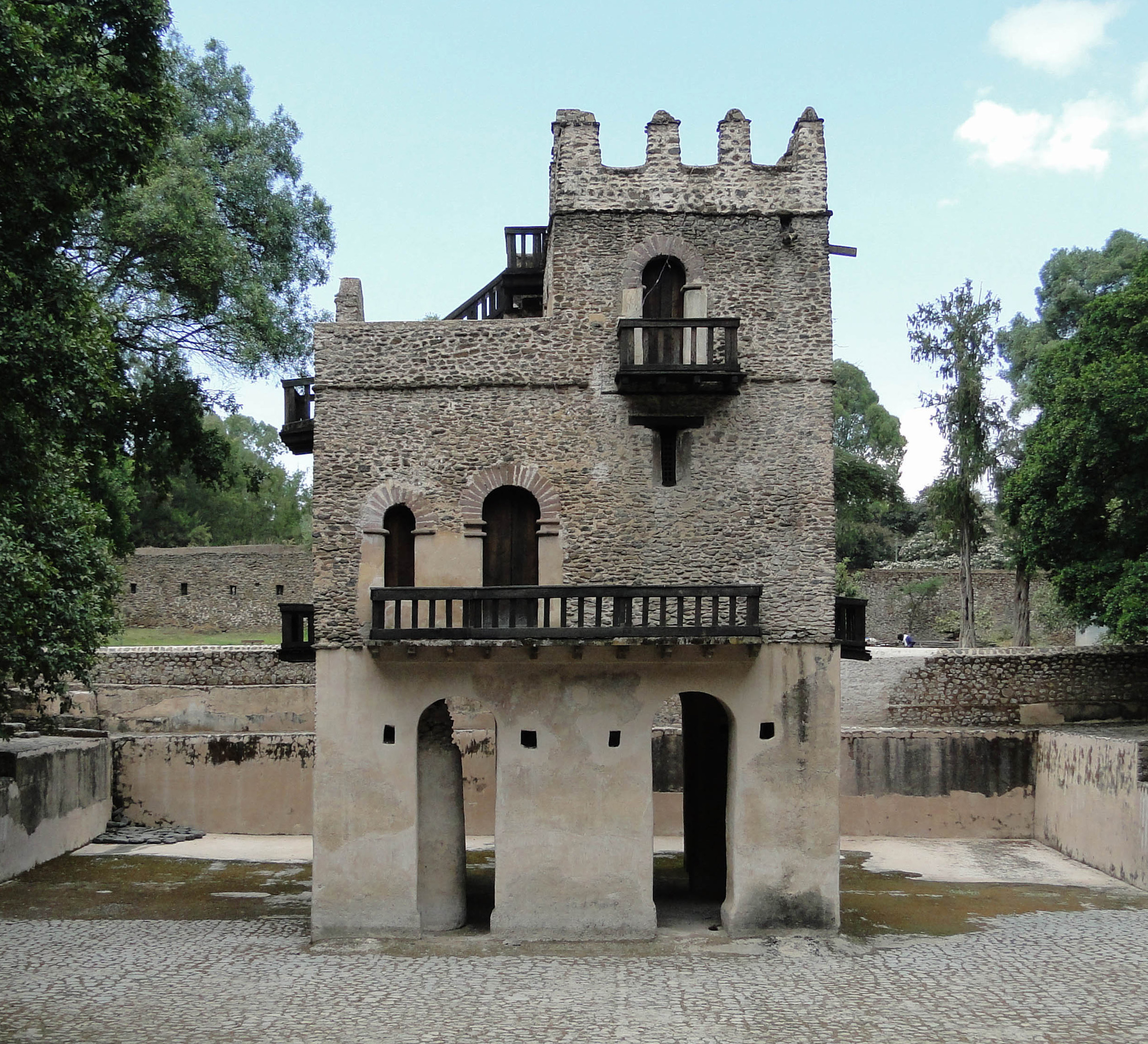
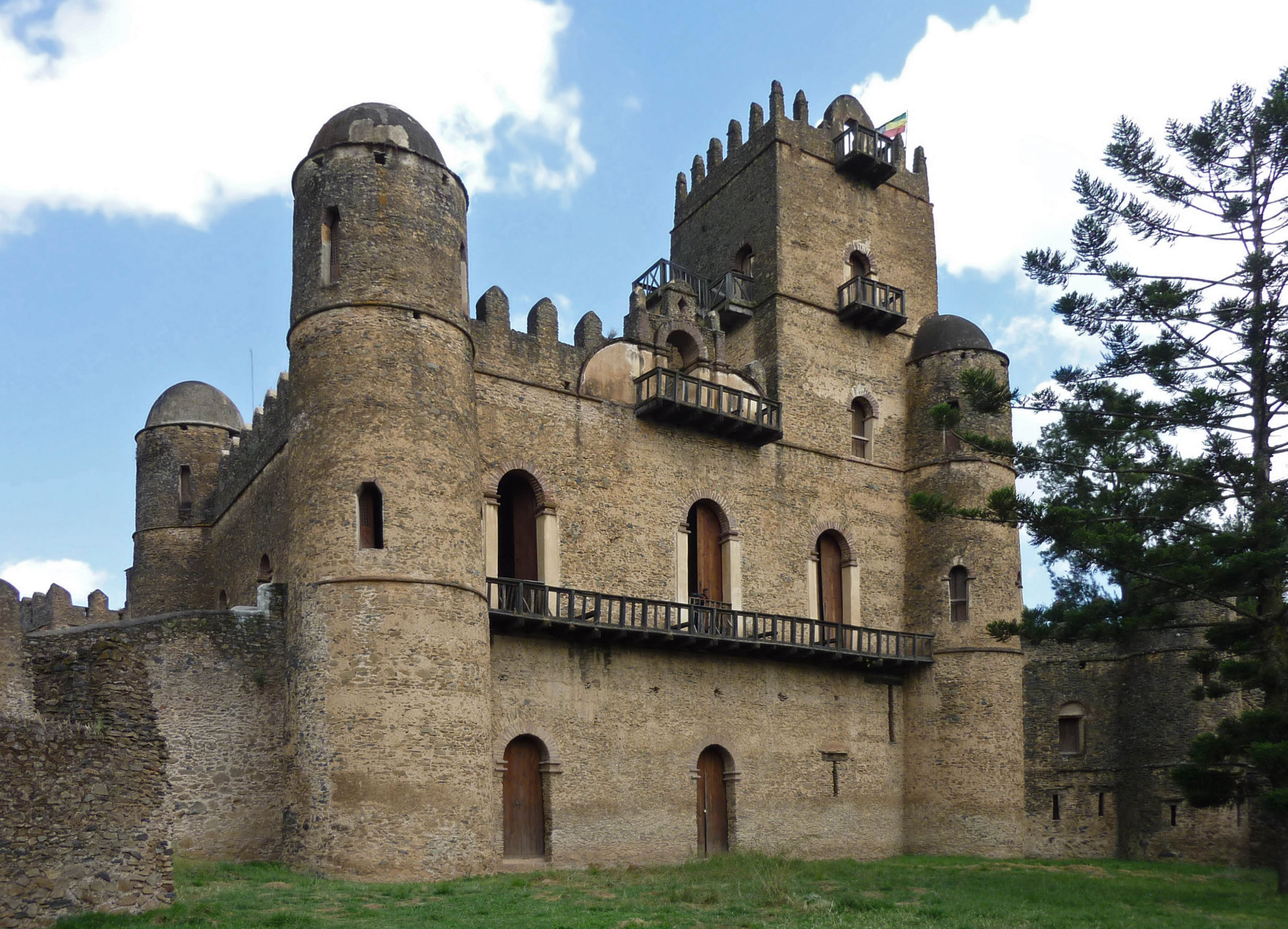
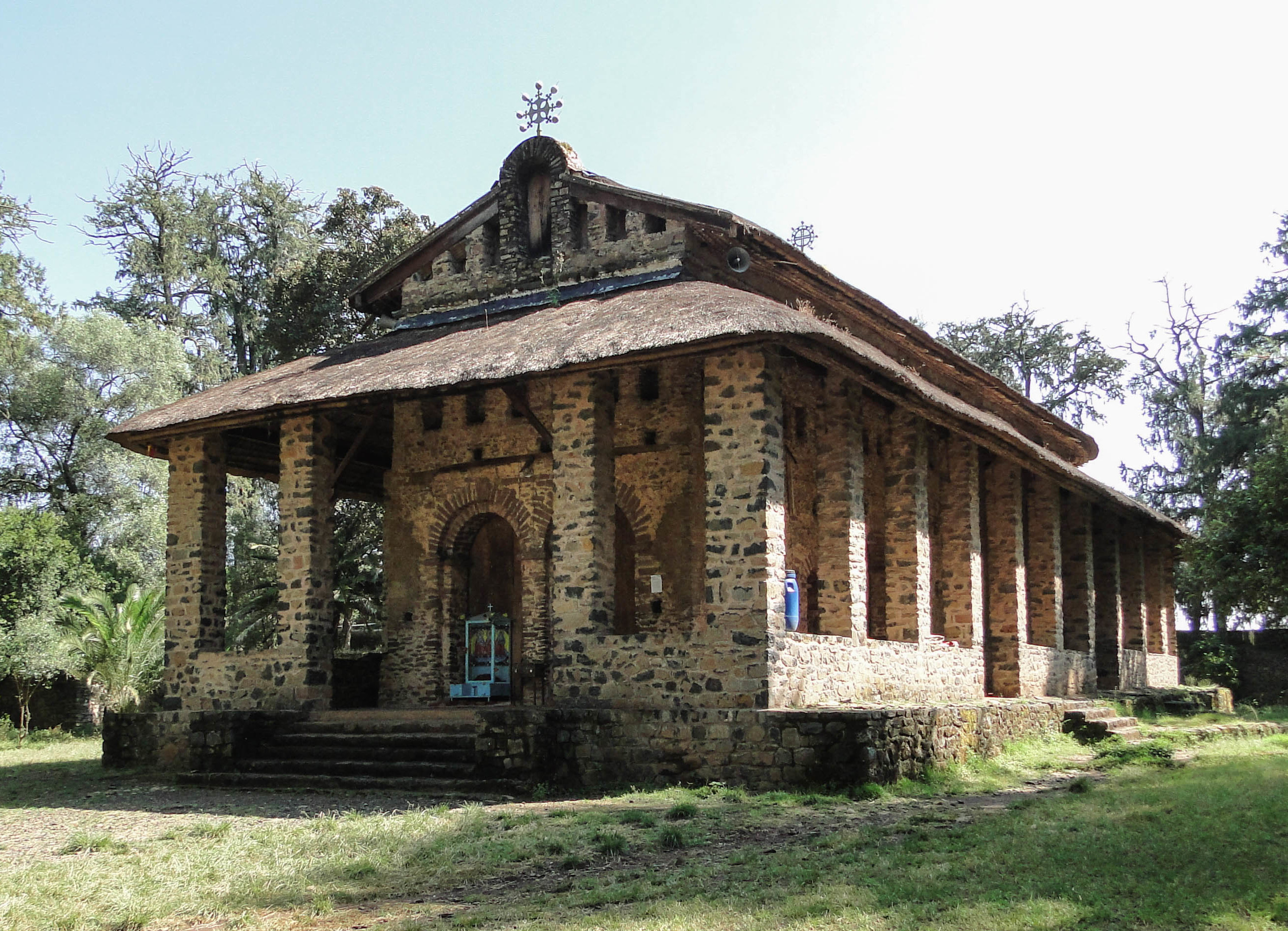
- From top, left to right: View of Gondar; Mentewab's Castle; Chancellery of Yohannes I; Fasilides Bath; Enqualal Gemb; and Debre Berhan Selassie Church

- Location within Ethiopia Location within the Horn of Africa Location within Africa
- Coordinates: 12°36′27″N 37°27′33″E
- Country: Ethiopia
- Region: Amhara
- Zone: North Gondar
- Founded: 1636
- Founder: Fasilides

Area
  - Total: 612 km^{2} (236 sq mi)
- Elevation: 2,133 m (6,998 ft)

Population (2012)
  - Total: 254,450
  - Estimate (2021): 1,243,156
  - Density: 416/km^{2} (1,080/sq mi)
- Time zone: UTC+3 (EAT)

Gondar, also spelled Gonder (Amharic: ጎንደር, Gonder (Note: Based on the BGN/PCGN romanization of Amharic.) or Gondär; (Note: Based on the EAE romanization of Amharic.) formerly ጐንደር, Gʷandar or Gʷender), is a city and woreda in Ethiopia. Located in the North Gondar Zone of the Amhara Region, Gondar is north of Lake Tana on the Lesser Angereb River and southwest of the Simien Mountains. As of 2021, Gondar has an estimated population of 443,156.

Gondar previously served as the capital of both the Ethiopian Empire and the subsequent Begemder Province. The city holds the remains of several royal castles, including those in the Fasil Ghebbi UNESCO World Heritage Site for which Gondar has been called the "Camelot of Africa".

== History ==
=== Origins ===
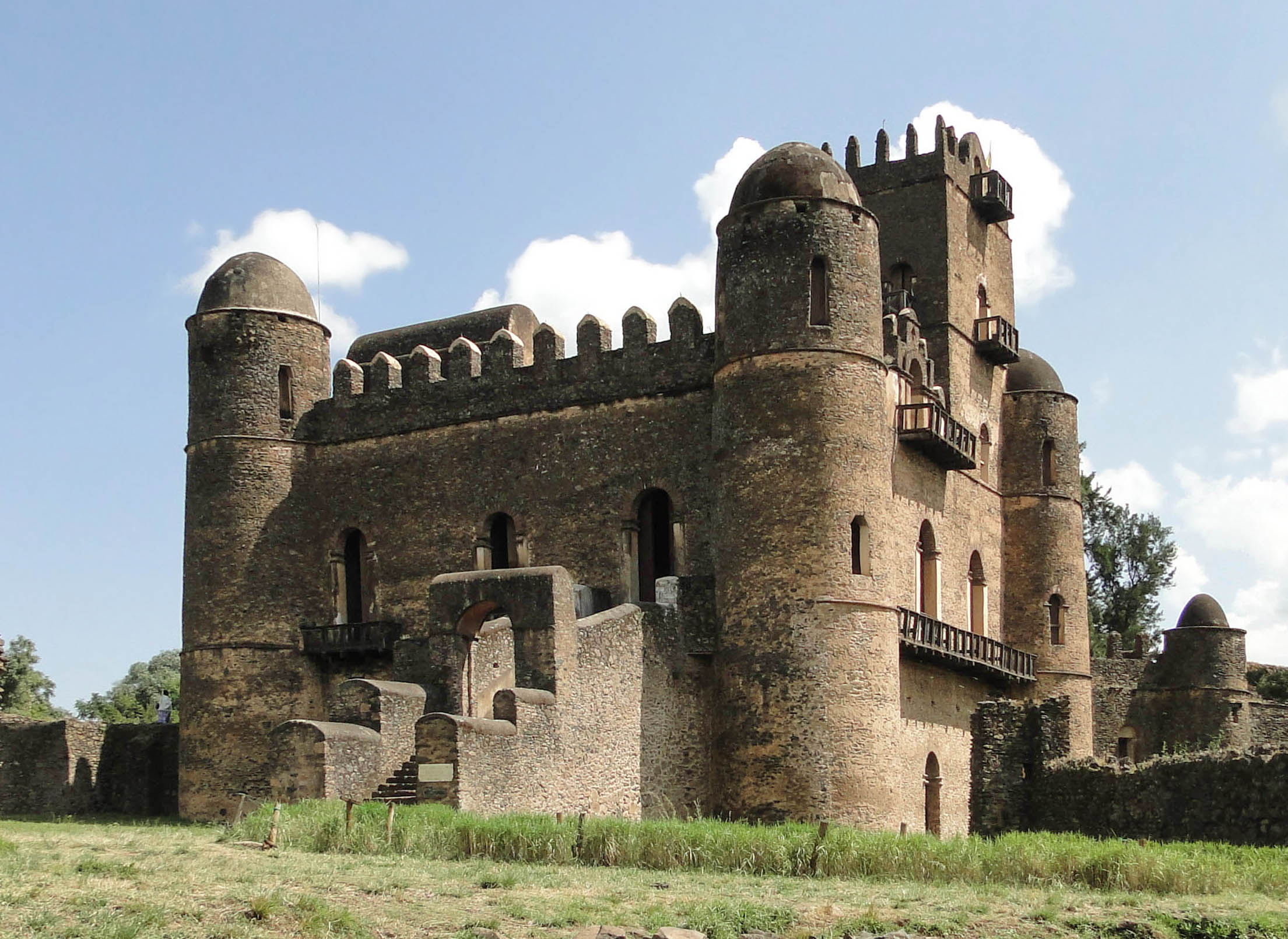
Fasilides Castle, founded by Emperor Fasilides

The term Gondar was first mentioned during the reign of Amda Seyon I as the name of a regiment of soldiers stationed (likely in Wegera) to guard nearby trade routes and control a restive population. In 1636, Emperor Fasilides selected Gondar as his katama (royal camp). Situated about 35 km due north of Lake Tana in the midst of Kémant country, Fasilides translocation from Danqaz to Gondar contributed to trading benefits as it was where caravans from Sudan and the Red Sea converged, despite Lent and rainy season prohibiting expeditions that made the emperor stay at the capital. Such incidents quickly enabled him to prolong his reign and construct many buildings for the purpose of giving capital and additional reforms.

=== 17th century ===
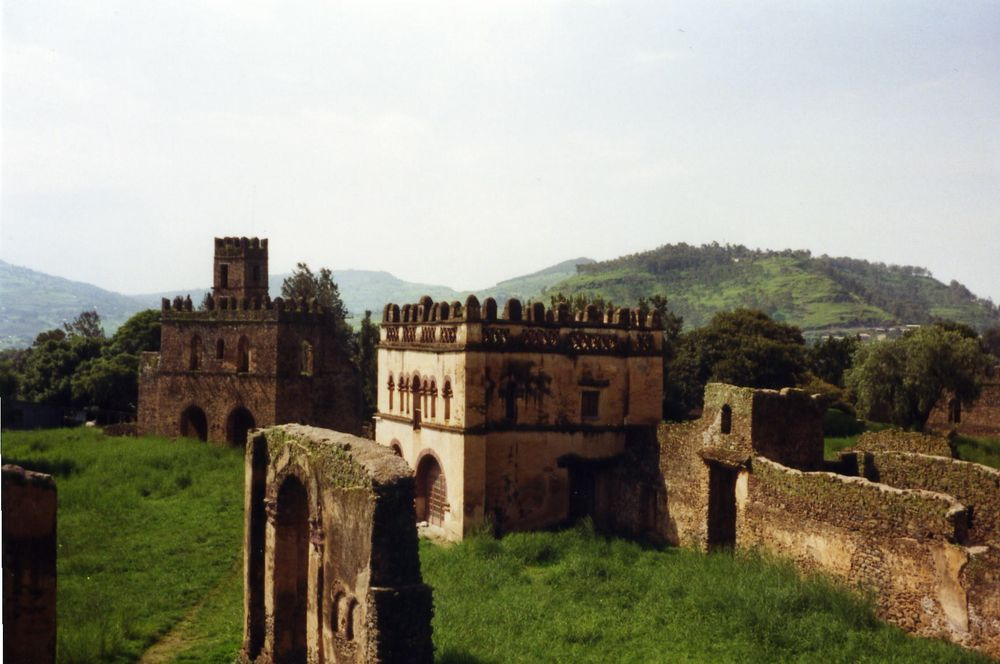
17th century library and chancellery in Gondar

Within the capital, Fasilides ordered the construction of the imposing edifice known as the Fasil Ghebbi or Fasilides Castle. Further, he established five other churches, including Mädòane Aläm and Fit Abbo. The pleasure-pool with stone pavilion beside the Qaha river known as the "Bath of Fasilides". In 1648, a Yemeni ambassador, Hassan ibn Ahmad al-Haymi, who visited the palace described it as a great house of stone and lime and "one of marvelous of buildings, worthy of admiration, and the most beautiful of outstanding wonders." The head stonemason was an Indian named Abdal Kerim who had previously worked on the palace of Emperor Susenyos I in Danqaz. In the newly built castle Al-Haymi saw beds from Constantinople, mattresses from India glittering with gold, sofas inlaid with pieces of jewelry and gems. His eye was also struck by the attire of the courtiers: gowns of silk brocade embroidered with gold, silk gowns, golden girdles "set with marvelous stones and precious gems", swords from Sennar inlaid with the choicest pure gold.

By the time of Fasilides' death in 1667, Gondar was so well established that his successor Yohannes I (1667–1682) made no attempt to seek out a new capital for himself like the former monarchs. On the contrary, he spent much more time in Gondar then his father had done. Though, he left every year on expeditions before returning to his capital, but spent half the year inside the city. In 1669–1670, the Emperor ordered Muslims and Jews to separate from Christians and form their own sectors in Gondar. By 1676, this decree resulted in Muslims settling in the lower town near the Qaha, in a quarter called Eslam Bet or Eslamge. The Beta Israel were assigned four quarters, including Abarra and Kayla Meda, near the Qaha. Key areas in the city included the royal enclosure (Makkabäbiya or Fail Gémb), Addebabay (a public square and market), Abun Bet (home of the abun), Eccäge Bet (residence of the -éccäge and a refuge), Qañn Bet (noble quarters), and Déngay (inhabited by Christian merchants). Yohannes died in July 1682, he "lived for ten days in a great new building" constructed that very year. According to the chronicles, this edifice, which was ornamented in ivory, was built by an Ethiopian architect named Walda Giyorgis who was described as "able, intelligent, and of good renown."

Yohannes's successor, Iyasu I (1682–1706), seems to have been very conscious to maintain the good will of the citizens of Gondar and it was reported that he never closed the doors of his palace, even at night, to give his subjects the impression that he trusted them. Iyasu's reign, like that of his father and grandfather, witnessed considerable building in the city. The Emperor was responsible for the erection of a new castle, and several other churches. The castle of Iyasu, which was reportedly erected by Walda Giyorgis, was described as "more beautiful then the house of Solomon." When Iyasu saw it he is said to have been "full of joy and happiness". During the reign of Iyasu I, the city's population was estimated to have exceeded 60,000.

=== 18th century ===
Gondar prospered until the reign of Tekle Giyorgis (r. 1779–1784), appropriately nicknamed Fäsame Mängest ("the End of Government"). This period was characterized by glorious personalities of Emperors such as Iyasu I, Bakaffa, Mentewab, and Dawit III. All castles and churches were highly centralized for royal nobilities. The French Charles Poncet, who has served as physician of Iyasu, offers wrote extensively about the town at the end of seventeenth century. His journey was important for it gave the outside world some information about the country during the period of its isolation, when the great city of Gondar was built. Poncet was the first European observer to describe the city, the existence of which was doubted in European circles where it was generally thought that Ethiopia still possessed no fixed capital. His third palace, Iyasu Palace also known as "Saddle on Horseback" resembles a saddle—to highlight the emperor's horsemanship. As a veteran of eleven battles and tax collector, Iyasu decorated his castle with ivory, mirrors, cedar, and a ceiling covered in gold leaf and precious stones.

After the death of Iyasu I death in 1706, Gondar became to decline because of most emperors preferred to enjoy luxurious life rather than spending in politics. Tigray acquired major importance after the establishment of a permanent capital at Gondar due its vicinity to the sea coast. As the traveler James Bruce noted, it was located where "every body must go in their way from Gondar to the Red Sea", the person who controlled this province could levy profitable tolls on the caravans which passed through. This development led to the ascension of major Tigrayan warlord Ras Mikael Sehul. However, the power was presided to Mentewab and the Amhara lords, where several members belonged to her family. They defended that the Empress should enthroned as Regent for her grandson as she had been for her son a decade and half earlier. Mentewab brought her brother Ras Wolde Leul to Gondar and made him Ras Bitwaded. After the death of Iyasu II on 27 June 1755, Ras Mikael Sehul, who was on the way with guns, carpets, gold, silver and other tribute from Tigre, learnt the news two days later, when they arrived at Sembera Zagan in Wagara. Without any delay, he proceeded to the capital and arriving the next day, he saw Iyasu II's son Iyoas I, who was a child at the time of his reign.

On 7 September 1755, an agreement between the Empress and Mikael involving the marriage of his son Dejazmach Wolde Hawaryat to Mentewab's daughter Woizero Atlas can be seen as the path to supreme power to Gondar. Unbeknownst to him, Mentewab believed that Mikael could cooperate with her and merge their dynastic alliance without awareness of his power and wealth. Their ceremony was described to be conducted by "great pomp" befitting with daughter of king and queen and "great enjoy" reigned in the House of Tigre ruler. According to chronicle, the marriage took place in Gondar, some three months after the death of Iyasu II and ascension of Iyoas.

The Oromo influence in Gondar rapidly began to increase in the 18th century. The last Gondarine Emperor to exercise full control was Iyasu II, during his reign multiple revolts broke out and it became apparent that the country was on the eve of political chaos. He was succeeded by Iyoas I, who effectively became an Oromo puppet. The city was now guarded by 3,000 Oromo troops and had essentially been taken over by the Oromos. In the face of overwhelming opposition towards the Oromo newcomers, Iyoas was forced to appeal to the powerful warlord Mikael Sehul. Ras Mikael thus became master of Gondar. In May 1767, Ras Mikael Sehul killed Iyoas and crowned 70 years old Yohannes II as, the Empire thus entered a period of supreme difficulty when its authority declined during the Zemene Mesafint. Upon his arrival in 1770, Wolda Hawariat claimed that Gondar had an epidemic of smallpox, where the chief comes to he capital with "ill of fever".

=== 19th century ===
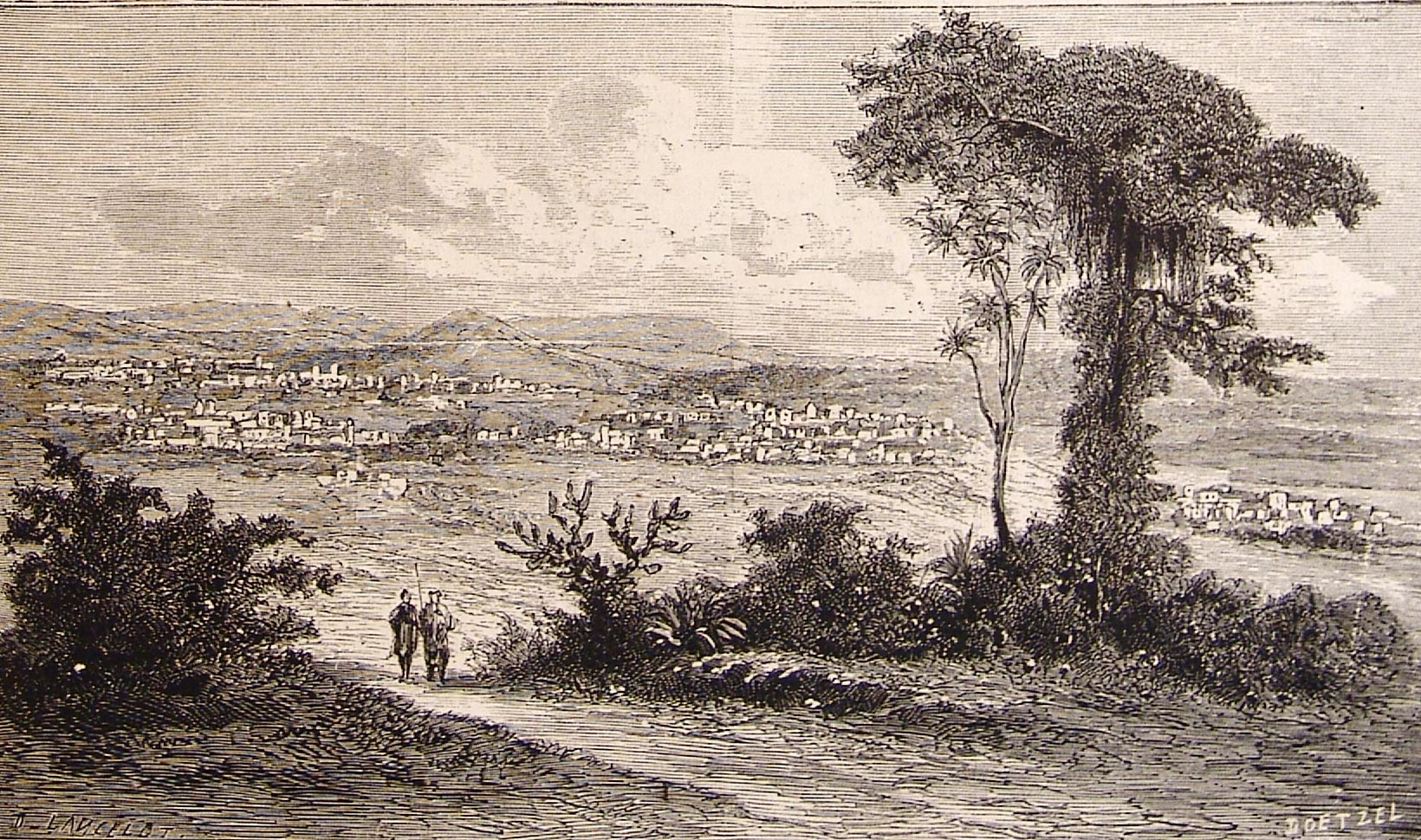
19th century illustration of Gondar

During the early 19th century, the city of Gondar in Ethiopia experienced several periods of unrest and violence, particularly during the reign of Emperor Gigar (1821–1830). According to historical accounts, soldiers entered the city, camped in the market, and plundered the area, including a district known as Déngay. Despite attempts by the Emperor and the Ečagē (chief of customs) to control the situation, their authority was ignored, and the city was looted. The Protestant missionary Samuel Gobat, who lived in Gondar in 1830, provides detailed accounts of the instability during this period. He described frequent civil disturbances that caused widespread fear, with residents fleeing to churches and other safe havens. Gobat reported that soldiers, under the command of Dejazmach Wube Haile Maryam, ruler of Semien, were involved in looting the city's market, and that many citizens expected the city to be plundered at any moment.

In 1831, tensions escalated when the relatives of Ali II, the ruler of Begemder, caused further unrest in Gondar, prompting the Emperor and Ečagē to withdraw from the capital. A few years later, in 1832–1833, Ali's soldiers continued their plundering campaigns, raiding homes and seizing supplies, which exacerbated the city's already fragile state. The situation became so dire that civilians were forced to hide their goods in churches for protection. These disturbances had a devastating impact on the economy and cultural life of Gondar. Merchants were unable to bring goods into the city due to the constant threat of theft, and intellectual activities suffered, as scholars lamented the collapse of educational institutions. In 1833, when Emperor Sahle Dengel attempted to reduce the power of the church by curbing its land holdings, priests and citizens protested, further destabilizing the region.

In 1854, Kassa Hailu took control of the town and called upon its nobles, citizens and clergy to accept his candidacy to the throne. The city assembly proclaimed him King of Kings, many cattle were slaughtered for the occasion and the Emperor gave alms generously to the poor. Tewodros, found it necessary to fight against local rulers and their followers in other areas, and was not attracted to Gondar which moreover seemed to him a symbol of Ethiopia's decadence. In 1864, Tewodros ordered the Muslim inhabitants of the city to convert to Christianity or leave, forcing many of them to flee the country. Relations between Tewodros and Gondar continued to deteriorate because of their suspected complicity in rebellion and the bitter disputes the Emperor had with the clergy. By the end of 1864, Tewodros declared Gondar to be a "town of priests who do not love me" and ordered the city to be violently sacked. His soldiers robbed the priests, burned down their residences, and plundered the monasteries in the former capital.

Emperor Yohannes IV spent the first part of his reign in Debre Tabor as Tewodros had done before him. The disappearance of the Emperor and his court led to a large demographic reduction in the city, Gondar's population, well over 60,000 in the 18th century, was said by some observers to have dwindled to only 8,000 in the 1870s. In the late 1880s, Gondar suffered serious blows as a result of fighting with the Mahdist Sudanese. The Ethiopian historian Blatengeta Heruy Wald Selassie, relates that the Mahdists entered the city in January 1888 "and burnt all the churches. Those who were brave were slaughtered on the spot, while the cowardly fled. The remainder, women and children were made prisoners and taken into slavery." In June of the following year the Mahdists again marched into Gondar and, "massacred the great and the humble, the men and women whom they found." As a result, Gondar towards the end of the century was thus little more than a ghost town abandoned in ruins.

=== 20th century ===
In early 1900s, peace and stability resulted in some revival in Gondar's fortunes. Gondar was favorably situated between Sudan to the west, Addis Ababa to the south, and Eritrea to the north and hence enjoyed a sizeable amount of commerce. This commerce primarily involved a variety of goods from the surrounding regions. These included salt from the Afar lowlands, brought to Gondar via Sekota; agricultural products from the Amhara and Agaw areas; livestock such as cattle, mules, and goats from Begemder; honey and wax from Semien and Wegera; cotton from Walqayt; ivory and gold from Bani Shangul; coffee and civet from Kaffa; and various locally made handicrafts. There were Italian representatives residing in Gondar; a merchant named Caremelli imported Italian cotton goods and distributed them in Gondar, and an Italian medical doctor gave free medical service to patients in Gondar.

During the Second Italo-Ethiopian War, the East African Fast Column (Colonna Celere dell'Africa Orientale) of General Achille Starace, composed of some 3,000 troops on more than 400 vehicles, entered Ethiopia from Omhajer, and after a difficult 380 km march, occupied Gondar without a fight on 1 April 1936. Within two years, 2,000 Europeans moved into the city. Local inhabitants were segregated into districts west and south of the castle enclosure, Italians settling in northern and north-eastern areas. New commercial and government buildings were erected north-east of the castles and a retail district, known henceforth as the "piazza", was laid out adjacent to the castle compound, all in 1930s "modernist" architecture. A central artery linked the Italian quarters, piazza, Ethiopian merchant quarter, and Saturday market. Another new road ran west of the Fasil "bath" and on to Azezo, where a landing-strip provided an air service with Asmara. Other new roads connected the city with Gojjam and with Eritrea, the latter a paved, all-season roadway. Colonial authorities, seeking to curry favor with local Muslims, built a mosque (for the first time with minaret) beside the Saturday market, authorized the appointment of a gadi for matters involving the Sara and permitted Muslims to settle outside Addis Alem. On 13–17 November 1941, the British and Italian military fought in Gondar during the East African Campaign of World War II, marking the withdrawal of Italian force from Italian East Africa.

In 1944, attempt to introduce land taxes following the Italian evacuation of the area met with military opposition in Gondar and Tigray. By 1950s, the population of Gondar had fallen to 13,000, with few churches remaining. While still an important religious center, Gondar became a poor town with few modern amenities. Gondar traded cotton, saddles, shoes, ornaments, and cloth with other regions of the Blue Nile, but otherwise cut off from the world. In 1970s, Gondar and Welega were hit by severe drought with the hardest year was in 1983–86.

In February 1989, the Soviet Union refused to ship more arms to Ethiopia, which resulted in a series of defeats causing the government to evacuate from the Tigray Province. The Tigray People's Liberation Front (TPLF) then assembled the Ethiopian People's Democratic Movement (EPDM) which formed the Ethiopian People's Revolutionary Democratic Front (EPRDF) and their force advanced to Gondar and Wollo Province. Shortly afterwards, this force cut the Addis Ababa–Gondar road and put Gojjam at risk. On 23 February 1991, the EPRDF launched a military offensive codenamed "Operation Tewodros" against the government in Gondar. In May 1991, Gondar was occupied by EPRDF forces concurrently with Wollo, Tigray and Gojjam.

=== 21st century ===
As a result of the War in Amhara that began in 2023, Gondar has seen a surge in violent crimes, including robbery, kidnapping, and murder.

On 17 September, Fano launched a large-scale offensive against Gondar, one of the largest cities in the Amhara region. After heavy fighting, Fano claimed to have killed over 100 ENDF soldiers and captured 40. The clashes resulted in the deaths of at least nine people and injuries to more than 30 others. After two days of intense fighting, Fano eventually withdrew from Gondar, as of October 2024 the city remains under Ethiopian government control.

== Cityscape ==
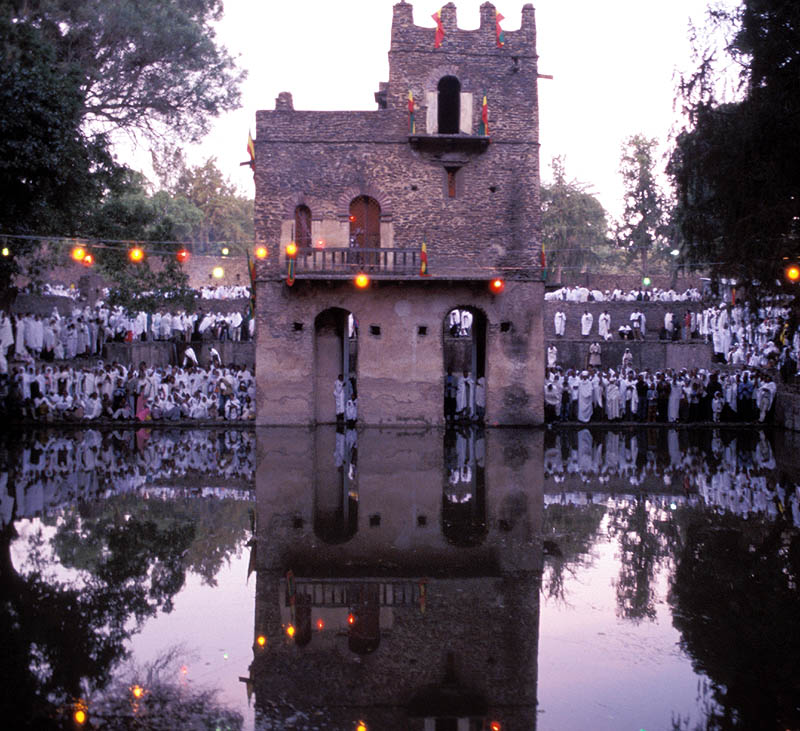
Crowds gather at the Fasilides' Bath in Gondar to celebrate Timkat – the Epiphany for the Ethiopian Orthodox Tewahedo Church.

Gondar traditionally was divided into several neighborhoods or quarters. These quarters are: Addis Alem, where the Muslim inhabitants dwelt; Kayla Mayda, where the adherents of Beta Israel lived; Abun Bet, centered on the residence of the Abuna, or nominal head of the Ethiopian Church; and Qagn Bet, home to the nobility. Gondar is also a noted center of ecclesiastical learning of the Ethiopian Orthodox Tewahedo Church, and known for having 44 churches – for many years more than any other settlement in Ethiopia. Gondar and its surrounding countryside constitute the homeland of most Ethiopian Jews.

The modern city of Gondar is popular as a tourist destination for its many picturesque ruins in Fasil Ghebbi (the Royal Enclosure), from which the emperors once reigned. The most famous buildings in the city lie in the Royal Enclosure, which include Fasilides' castle, Iyasu's palace, Dawit's Hall, a banqueting hall, stables, Empress Mentewab's castle, a chancellery, library and three churches. Near the city lie Fasilides' Bath, home to an annual ceremony where it is blessed and then opened for bathing; the Qusquam complex, built by Empress Mentewab; the eighteenth century Ras Mikael Sehul's Palace and the Debre Berhan Selassie Church.

Downtown Gondar shows the influence of the Italian occupation of the late 1930s. The main piazza features shops, a cinema, and other public buildings in a simplified Italian Moderne style still distinctively of the period despite later changes and, frequently, neglect. Villas and flats in the nearby quarter that once housed occupation officials and colonists are also of interest.

== Education ==
The town is home to the University of Gondar, which includes Ethiopia's main faculty of medicine. Teda Health Science College is also located at this town.

== Demographics ==
Historical population
Year	Pop.	±%
1984	80,886	—
1994	112,249	+38.8%
2007	207,044	+84.5%
2012	254,450	+22.9%
2015	323,900	+27.3%

A 2012 estimate puts the population at 254,450. This gives a population density of 416 people per square kilometer (1080 people per square mile), given its area of 612 km square kilometers (236 square miles), very significantly higher than either the North Gondar Zone average of 70.19 people per square kilometer (181.80 people per square mile) or the average of the 188.44 people per square kilometer (488.052 people per square mile) of the Gondar Zuria woreda which surrounds it.

Based on the 2007 national census conducted by the Central Statistical Agency of Ethiopia (CSA), the woreda had a total population of 207,044, an increase of 84.45% from the 1994 census, of whom 98,120 were male and 108,924 female. A total of 53,725 households were counted in this woreda, resulting in an average of 3.85 persons to a household, and 50,818 housing units.The 1994 national census reported a total population for this woreda of 112,249 in 22,932 households, of whom 51,366 were male and 60,883 female.

Ethnic groups of Gondar in 1994
1. Amhara (88.9%)
2. Tigrayan (6.74%)
3. Qemant (2.37%)
4. Other (1.98%)

In 1994 the three largest ethnic groups reported in Gondar were the Amhara (88.91%), Tigrayans (6.74%), and Qemant (2.37%); all other ethnic groups made up 1.98% of the population. Amharic was spoken as a first language by 94.57% of the population and Tigrinya was spoken as a first language by 4.67% of the population; the remaining 0.76% spoke all other primary languages reported. 83.31% practiced Ethiopian Orthodox Christianity, and 15.83% of the population said they were Muslim. In 2007 the majority of the inhabitants still practiced Ethiopian Orthodox Christianity, with 84.15% reporting that as their religion, while 11.77% of the population said they were Muslim.

== Transport ==
Air transport is served by Gondar Airport (ICAO code HAGN, IATA GDQ), also known as Atse Tewodros Airport, after the Emperor of Ethiopia (Atse) Tewodros. It is 18 km (11 miles) south of the city. Travel within Gondar is mostly done by mini-buses and 3-wheeler motorcycles (accommodating 3–4 passengers).

Intercity bus service is provided by the forward travellers sacco and Sky Bus Transport System, as well as independently owned buses that depart from the town bus station.

== Climate ==
The climate of Gondar is mild, temperate to warm, with an average temperature of 20 °C year round. Köppen-Geiger climate classification system classifies its climate as subtropical highland (Cwb).

Climate data for Gondar
Month	Jan	Feb	Mar	Apr	May	Jun	Jul	Aug	Sep	Oct	Nov	Dec	Year
Record high °C (°F)	31.0 (87.8)	33.4 (92.1)	33.5 (92.3)	34.1 (93.4)	33.4 (92.1)	34.8 (94.6)	26.6 (79.9)	31.0 (87.8)	29.9 (85.8)	29.6 (85.3)	29.7 (85.5)	30.2 (86.4)	34.8 (94.6)
Mean daily maximum °C (°F)	28.4 (83.1)	29.2 (84.6)	29.3 (84.7)	27.9 (82.2)	26.6 (79.9)	25.2 (77.4)	23.6 (74.5)	24.1 (75.4)	25.0 (77.0)	26.2 (79.2)	27.5 (81.5)	27.9 (82.2)	26.7 (80.1)
Daily mean °C (°F)	19.8 (67.6)	21.5 (70.7)	22.7 (72.9)	22.7 (72.9)	21.7 (71.1)	19.7 (67.5)	17.8 (64.0)	17.9 (64.2)	18.7 (65.7)	19.2 (66.6)	19.3 (66.7)	19.4 (66.9)	20.0 (68.0)
Mean daily minimum °C (°F)	10.4 (50.7)	11.6 (52.9)	12.5 (54.5)	13.6 (56.5)	13.8 (56.8)	13.9 (57.0)	14.0 (57.2)	13.9 (57.0)	13.1 (55.6)	11.8 (53.2)	9.4 (48.9)	9.2 (48.6)	12.3 (54.1)
Record low °C (°F)	3.0 (37.4)	5.2 (41.4)	6.2 (43.2)	9.2 (48.6)	5.5 (41.9)	6.0 (42.8)	8.4 (47.1)	8.0 (46.4)	7.0 (44.6)	6.0 (42.8)	4.5 (40.1)	1.6 (34.9)	1.6 (34.9)
Average rainfall mm (inches)	2 (0.1)	2 (0.1)	13 (0.5)	32 (1.3)	72 (2.8)	160 (6.3)	293 (11.5)	275 (10.8)	112 (4.4)	60 (2.4)	12 (0.5)	4 (0.2)	1,037 (40.9)
Average rainy days (≥ 0.1 mm)	0	0	2	5	12	13	20	21	19	15	3	0	110
Average relative humidity (%)	44	40	39	39	52	69	79	79	72	65	56	48	57
Mean monthly sunshine hours	291.4	243.0	229.4	249.0	238.7	183.0	114.7	139.5	204.0	229.4	240.0	279.0	2,641.1
Mean daily sunshine hours	9.4	8.6	7.4	8.3	7.7	6.1	3.7	4.5	6.8	7.4	8.0	9.0	7.2
Source 1: National Meteorology Agency (average high and low)
Source 2: World Meteorological Organisation (rainfall 1981–2010)Deutscher Wetterdienst (mean temperatures 1954–1990, humidity 1957–1982, and sun 1937–1990) Meteo Climat (extremes 1924–present)

== Sister cities ==
As designated by Sister Cities International, Gondar is a sister city with:

- Corvallis, Oregon, United States
- Florence, Italy
- Rishon LeZion, Israel

== Notable people ==
- Abby Lakew
- Aster Aweke: singer
- Eténèsh Wassié: singer and Azmari
- Haile Gerima
- Yityish Titi Aynaw: Miss Israel 2013
- Fasil Demoz: singer
- Liliana Mele: actress
- Fano Mesafint: Fano Dereje: Fano Demeke: Fano Agaye: Fano Selomon: Fano Arega: Fano Mesay: freedom fighters
- Tamagn Beyene: humanitarian and freedom fighter

== See also ==
- List of Gondarine churches
- Gultosh – a deserted village near Gondar
- Azezo – a nearby village south of Gondar
