= Subliminal (rapper) =

Israeli rapper (born 1979)

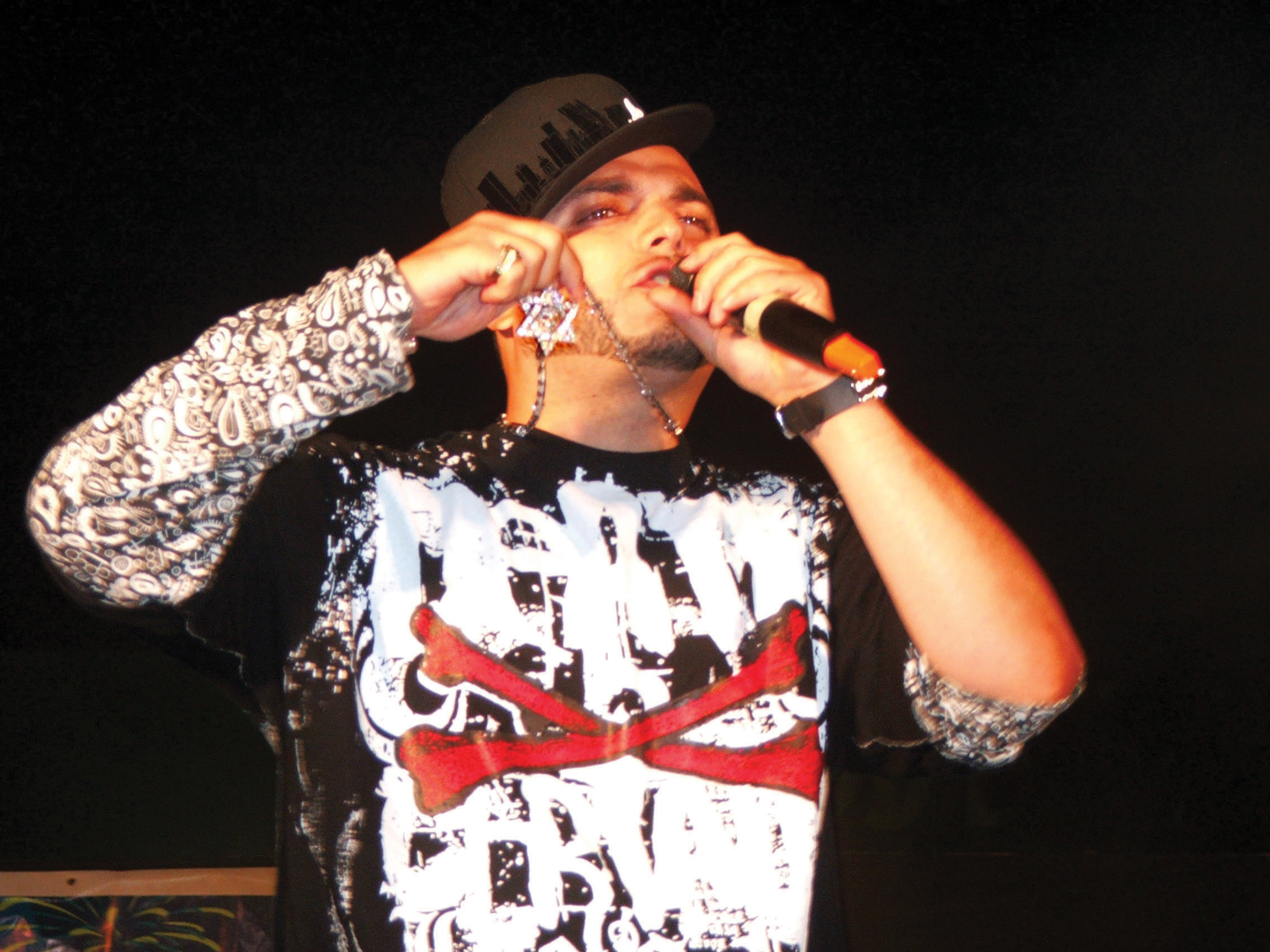

Background information
- Born: Ya'akov Shimony; November 13, 1979 (age 46); Tel Aviv, Israel
- Origin: Tel Aviv, Israel
- Genre: Hip-hop
- Occupations: Rapper; singer; record producer
- Years active: 1994–present
- Label: TACT Records/NMC United
- Website: TACT-Records.com

Ya'akov "Kobi" Shimoni (Hebrew: יעקב "קובי" שמעוני; born November 13, 1979), generally known by his stage name Subliminal (Hebrew: סאבלימינל), is an Israeli rapper, singer and record producer.

== Background ==
Subliminal was born in Tel Aviv, Israel, to a Persian Jewish mother and Tunisian Jewish father from Gafsa. Subliminal started performing music at age 12, and at age 15 he met Yoav "HaTzel" Eliasi. The two quickly became friends as a result of their mutual love of hip-hop.

In 1995 the two began performing in Israeli clubs geared toward a hip-hop audience, wearing baggy clothes and gold chains. They quickly developed a following among the nation's youth, and soon put out their first album, "The Light From Zion".

After the outbreak of the Second Intifada in 2000, the two began writing patriotic songs. They became known as creators of "Zionist hip-hop", a label still applied to them. In further contrast to the generally rebellious "outlaw" nature of most hip-hop, they also praise army service and eschew drugs and smoking.

Being the son of Jewish refugees is at the core of Subliminal's hard-line politics. "In Tunisia, my father grew up with his family locking all the doors and windows whenever performing a Jewish ceremony -- out of fear of attacks." Both parents, he says, "ran for their lives" to Israel, where they spent decades recovering from the persecution they had faced.

Subliminal and his rapping partner at the time, Ha'Tzel ("The Shadow"), also helped discover the Palestinian rapper Tamer Nafar; they collaborated but eventually fell out over Subliminal and Nafar's political disagreement. The bitter end of their musical relationship is chronicled in the documentary film Channels of Rage.

In 2006, Subliminal collaborated with countertenor David D'Or to produce the song "Ten Koah" ("Give Me Strength") on Subliminal's hip-hop album, Just When You Thought it Was Over.

In 2010, Subliminal married Ines Goldberg.

== Social impact ==
Through lyrics and concerts, Subliminal and his rap group aim to inspire and encourage a new generation to stand as a unified Israeli nation. At many of his concerts, Subliminal begins by calling to the audience, "Who is proud to be a Zionist in the state of Israel, put your hands in the air! Hell yeah!" Subliminal can be seen at many of his concerts wearing American hip-hop clothing and a large Star of David chain necklace. Journalist Joshua Mitnick writes that with Subliminal's patriotic, 2002 chart-topping album "Ha’or v’Ha’tzel" (The Light and the Shadow),

He transformed the Star of David into a fashion statement and helped integrate the music of urban America into the fold of Israeli pop… For Subliminal, the music has generated tens of thousands of record sales. For Israeli teens, it has given voice to their outrage at the state of affairs in their country. Hip-hop, a quintessentially American art form, is helping bolster national morale in a country bruised by… years of fighting between Israelis and Palestinians.

== Discography ==
Studio albums

- Ha'Or m'Zion (האור מציון, "The Light From Zion") (2000)
- Ha'Or Ve'HaTzel with HaTzel (האור והצל, "The Light and the Shadow") 2002
- TACT All-Stars with Mishpacha TACT (תאקט אול סטארז, "TACT All-Stars") (2004)
- Bediuk Kshe'Chashavtem she'Hakol Nigmar (בדיוק כשחשבתם שהכל נגמר, "Just When You Thought It Was All Over") (2006)
- Jew-niversal (2011)
- Tzeva Lahaim (צבע לחיים, "Life in colour") (2017)

== See also ==
- Ha'Tzel
- Israeli hip-hop
