= The Shadow (rapper) =

Israeli rapper (born 1977)

The Shadow יואב אליאסי
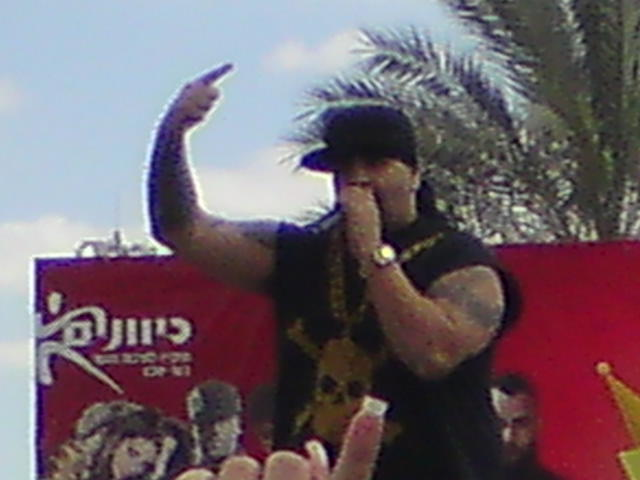
- Eliasi in 2009

Background information
- Born: Yoav Eliasi; November 22, 1977 (age 48)
- Origin: Safed, Israel
- Genres: Hip hop; Israeli hip hop; political hip hop
- Years active: 1994–present
- Label: Unicell

Yoav Eliasi (Hebrew: יואב אליאסי; born November 22, 1977), commonly known by his stage name The Shadow (Hebrew: הצל, Ha-Tzel), is an Israeli rapper, blogger, and far-right political activist. He was part of the roster of artists on the label TACT Records.

== Background ==
Yoav Eliasi was born in Safed, Israel. His parents are of both of Ashkenazi Jewish (Romanian-Jewish) and Mizrahi Jewish (Persian-Jewish) descent. His family relocated to Tel Aviv two years later. By his teenage years he had formed a deep bond with Kobi "Subliminal" Shimoni, and the two began performing together at hip-hop shows.

After finishing his mandatory military service in the IDF, he decided to stay on. This is where his rap name allegedly derives from. The official TACT Records profile says that Yoav Eliasi was in an elite undercover unit where he could not show his face, though in an interview with Yehoram Gaon on Channel 1, Eliasi claims that he was a M'faked Mishma'at ("Discipline Officer").

== Political activism ==
According to Haaretz:

The Shadow and Subliminal's peak popularity is behind them – the duo reached platinum status in Israel nearly two decades ago, in the early 2000s. Now, Eliassi is better known for his ultra-nationalist politics than for his music. He has built a massive online following through posts that frequently target Arabs, leftists, LGBTQ Israelis and asylum seekers, often skirting the line of explicit incitement while unleashing a torrent of hate speech from his followers, who call themselves "The Shadow's Lions."

In July 2014, Eliasi was a central organiser of a right-wing confrontation on a demonstration by Israeli left-wing anti-war protesters opposing Operation Protective Edge against Gaza. An editorial in Haaretz described him as "the dangerous product of incessant incitement by extreme right-wing elements."

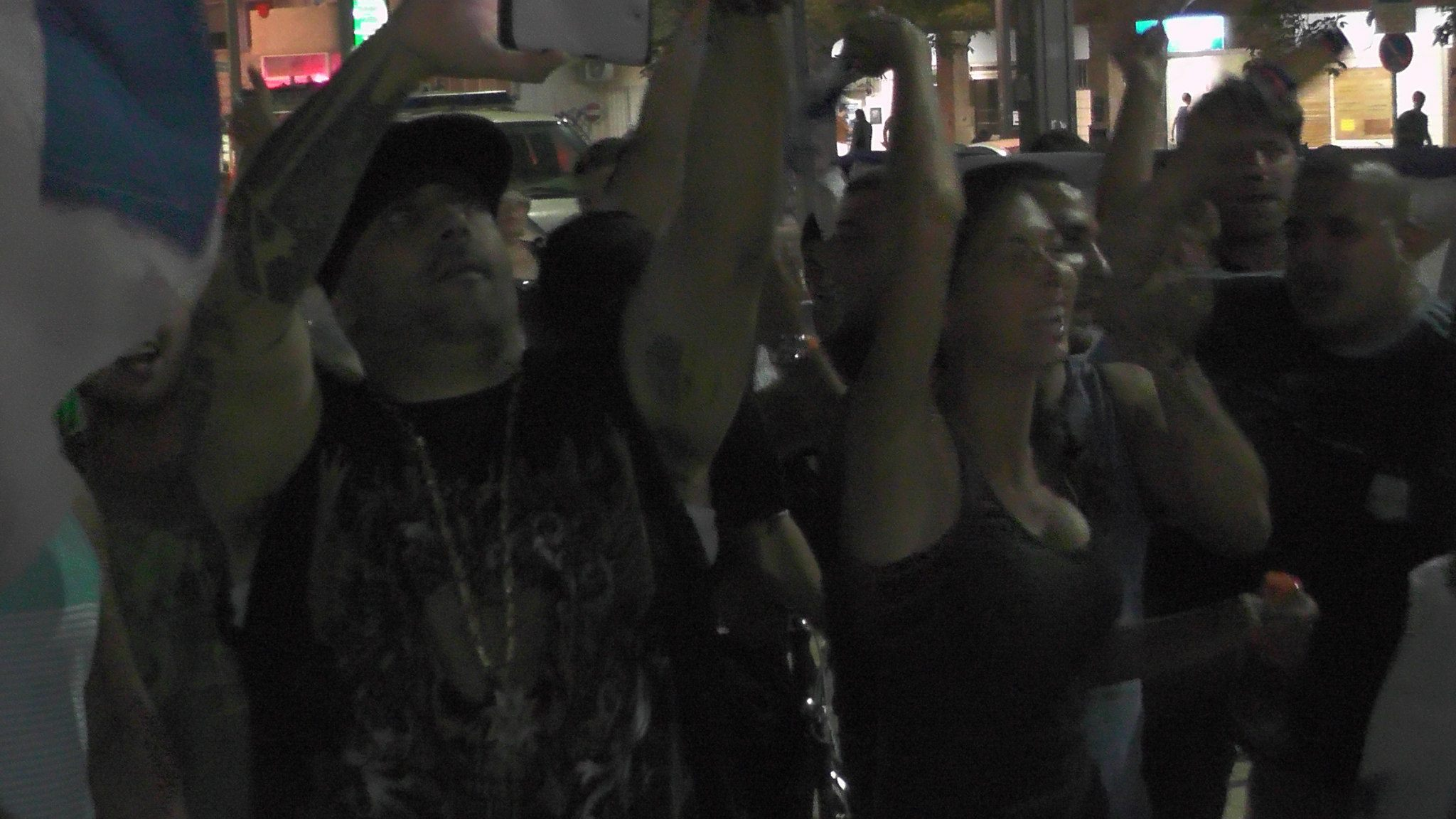
Aliasi in confrontation with leftist activists in Tel Aviv, Israel

In 2024, Eliasi was given the honorary title of inspector by the Tel Aviv District Chief of the Israeli police in the presence of Israel's Minister of National Security, Itamar Ben-Gvir.

== Discography ==
=== Studio albums ===
==== Solo ====
- Lo Sam Zain (Hebrew: לא שם זין, "Don't give a damn" [official translation by TACT] ) (2008)

==== With Subliminal ====
- Ha'Or Ve'HaTzel (Hebrew: האור והצל, "The Light and the Shadow") 2002

==== With TACT (Tel Aviv City Team) ====
- TACT All-Stars (Hebrew: תאקט אול סטארז, "TACT All-Stars") (2004)

=== Singles ===
==== Solo ====
===== From Lo Sam Zain =====
- Meantezet 2007 (Hebrew: מענטזת 2007, "Moves Her Ass 2007") (2007)

==== With TACT ====
===== Non-album singles =====
- Shir Shel Rega Ehad (Hebrew: שיר של רגע אחד, "Song of One Moment") (2005)

===== From TACT All-Stars =====
- Hineni/Viens Ici (Hebrew: הנני/VIENS ICI, "Here I am") (2004)
- Lama (Hebrew: למה, "Why?") (2004)
- Prahim ba'Kaneh (Hebrew: פרחים בקנה, "Flowers in the Turrets") (2004)
- Peace in the Middle East (Hebrew: שלום במזרח התיכון, "Peace in the Middle East") (2004)
