= Daniel B. Shapiro =

American diplomat (born 1969)

Dan Shapiro
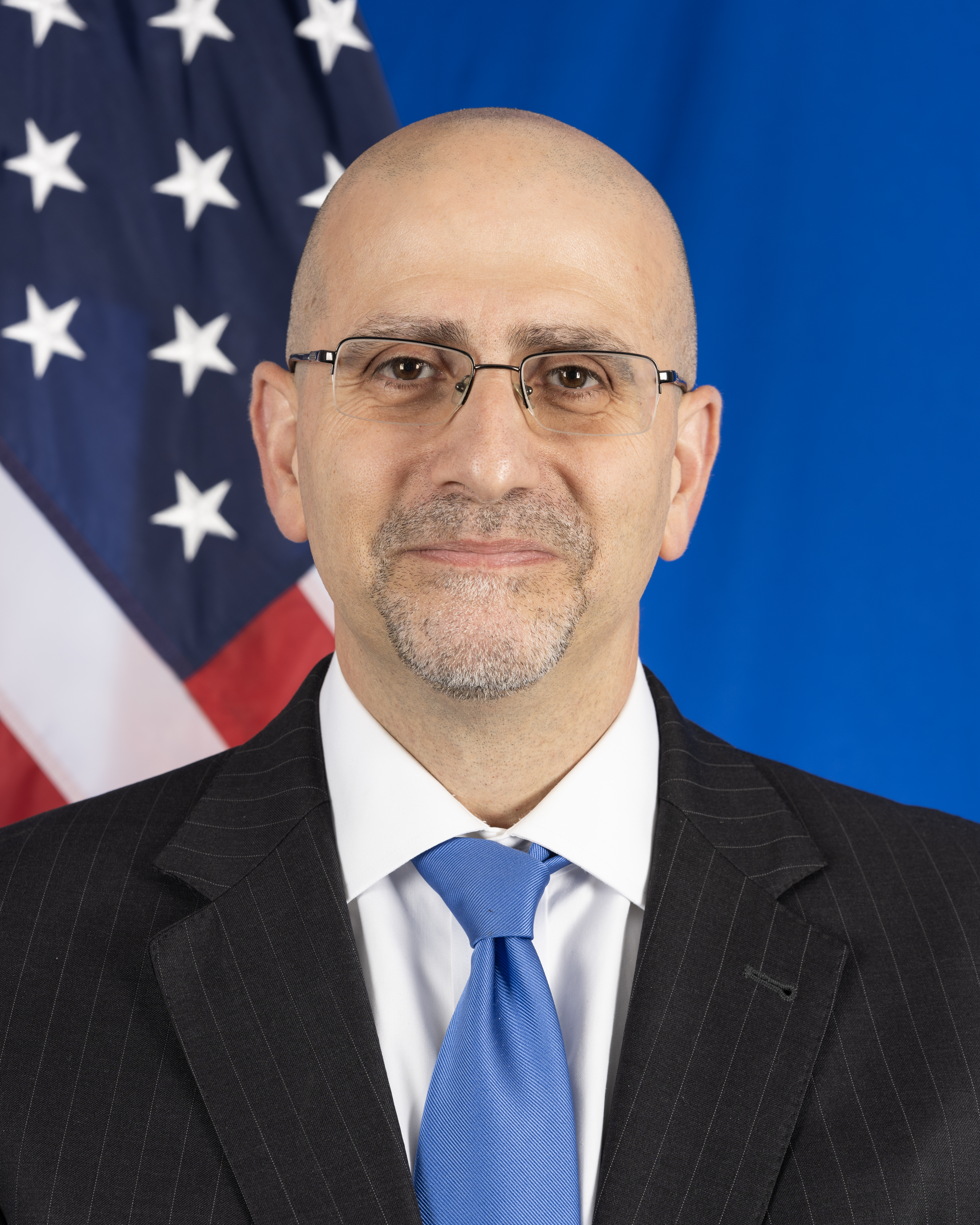
- Official portrait, 2023

United States Ambassador to Israel
- In office August 8, 2011 – January 20, 2017
- President: Barack Obama
- Preceded by: James Cunningham
- Succeeded by: David M. Friedman

Personal details
- Born: Daniel Benjamin Shapiro; August 1, 1969 (age 57) Champaign, Illinois, U.S.
- Spouse: Julie Fisher
- Children: 3
- Education: Washington University in St. Louis; Brandeis University (BA); Harvard University (MA)
- Website: Official website

Daniel Benjamin Shapiro (born August 1, 1969) is an American diplomat who served as United States Ambassador to Israel from 2011 to 2017. He was nominated by President Barack Obama on March 29, 2011, and confirmed by the Senate on May 29. He was sworn in as ambassador by Secretary of State Hillary Clinton on July 8, 2011.

Previously, he was the senior director for the Middle East and North Africa on the United States National Security Council. As an Obama administration political appointee, Shapiro was ordered on January 5, 2017 to resign upon the inauguration of President Donald Trump. On August 30, 2021, President Joe Biden appointed Shapiro as a special liaison to Israel on Iran.

== Biography ==
Dan Shapiro was born to a Jewish family in Champaign, Illinois, one of four children of novelist Elizabeth Klein Shapiro and University of Illinois English professor emeritus Michael Shapiro. He went to Westview Elementary and Edison Middle school in Champaign, and graduated from the University Laboratory High School in 1986. He attended Washington University in St. Louis, spent his sophomore year in Israel, then transferred to Brandeis University, from which he graduated in 1991 with a bachelor's degree in Near Eastern and Judaic Studies. In 1993 he earned a master's degree in Middle Eastern Studies from Harvard University.

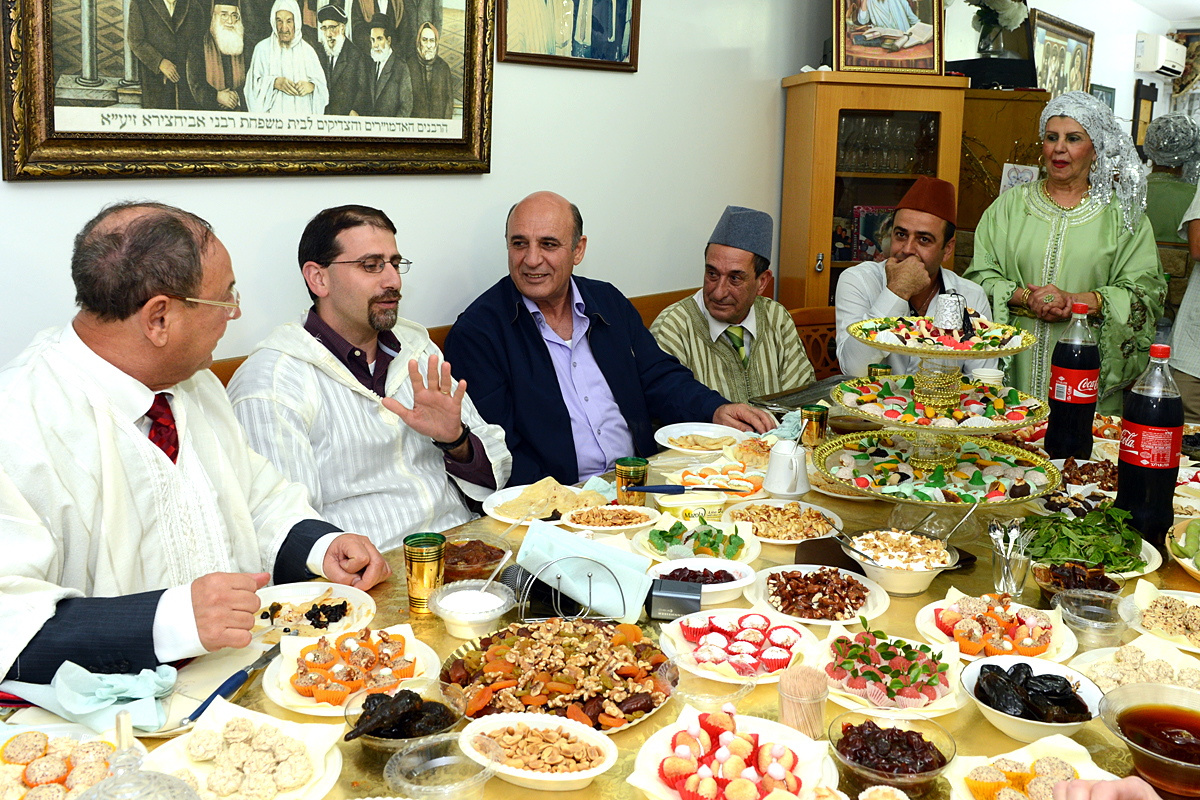
Dan Shapiro at Mimouna celebration in Ashkelon, Israel, 2013

Shapiro speaks both Hebrew and Arabic.

Shapiro is married to Julie Fisher. The couple has three daughters. They are members of the Conservative Jewish Adas Israel Congregation in Washington.

== Public service and diplomatic career ==
From 1993 to 1995, Shapiro served as a professional staff member on the House Foreign Affairs Committee under Chairman Lee H. Hamilton. From 1995 to 1999, he was a legislative assistant and senior foreign policy adviser to Senator Dianne Feinstein. From 1999 to 2001, he sat on the National Security Council under President Bill Clinton, as director of legislative affairs, and as a Congressional liaison for National Security Adviser Sandy Berger. From 2001 to 2007, he was first legislative adviser and then deputy chief of staff (primarily on foreign policy issues) for U.S. Senator Bill Nelson. From 2007 to 2008, he was vice president of the Washington, D.C., lobbying firm Timmons & Company.

In 2007 Shapiro became an advisor to then-U.S. Senator Barack Obama on Middle East and Jewish community issues, also assisting as strategist and fundraiser. He accompanied Obama on his July 2008 trip to Israel; in August 2008, Obama appointed him senior policy adviser and Jewish outreach coordinator for his 2008 presidential campaign.

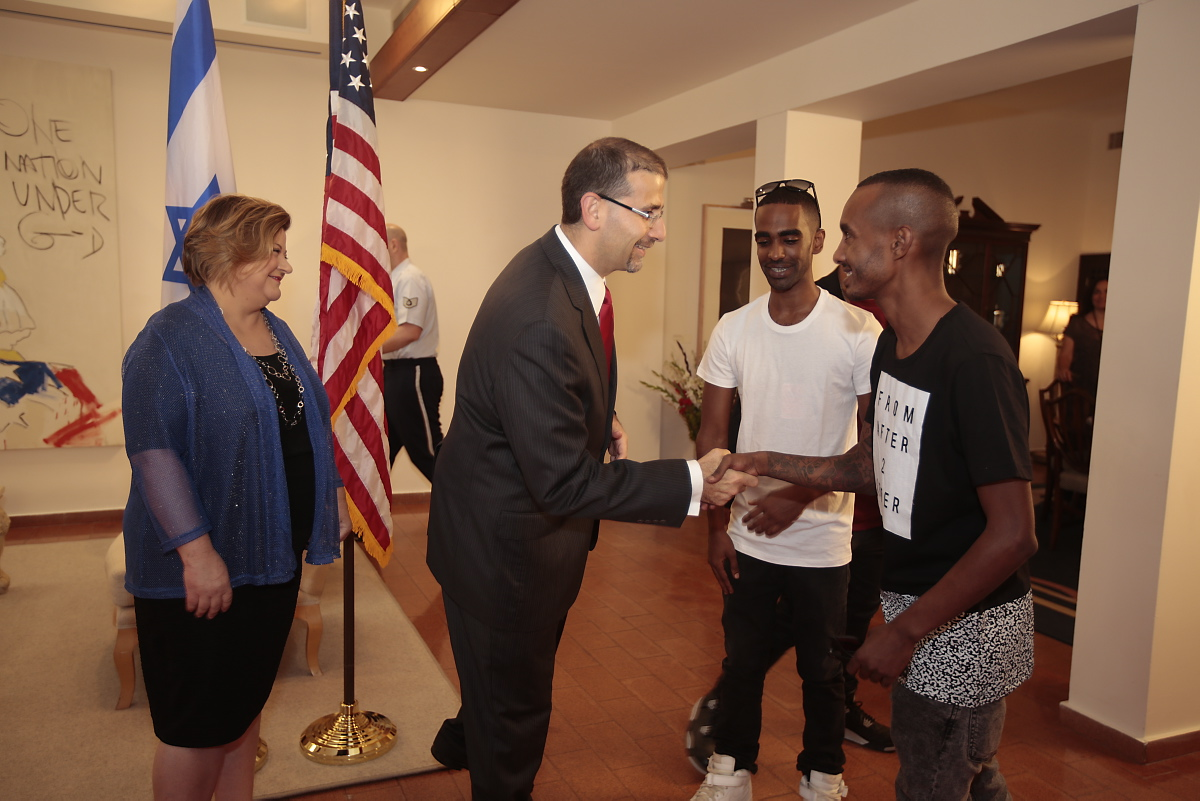
U.S. Ambassador to Israel Shapiro, at the Ambassador's Residence, with the Israeli hip hop duo Strong Black Coffee (July 4, 2015)

In January 2009, Shapiro was appointed senior director for the Middle East and North Africa of the U.S. National Security Council. Focusing on Israel, he attended every Israel-related meeting, and met with every senior Israeli diplomat and military officer who visited Washington, D.C. Shapiro often accompanied U.S. Special Envoy for Middle East Peace George J. Mitchell on his trips to the region, and played a central role in talks regarding the Middle East Peace Process and the strengthening of military cooperation between the U.S. and Israel. He maintained close relations with Israeli prime minister Benyamin Netanyahu, despite tensions between Netanyahu and Obama. In June 2011, Shapiro was appointed Ambassador to Israel. On January 17, 2017, he took leave of the President of Israel, Reuven Rivlin, and two days later he held his final meeting with Netanyahu, which one newspaper called a "terse farewell".

After concluding his service as ambassador to Israel, Shapiro became a Distinguished Visiting Fellow at the Institute for National Security Studies at Tel Aviv University. He was then a principal at WestExec Advisors from 2017 to 2021. he worked at the United States Department of State as Senior Advisor to the Special Envoy for Iran In 2021-2022 and as Senior Advisor for Regional Integration in the Bureau of Near Eastern Affairs in 2023-2024. Between these posts he was the Director of the N7 Initiative and Distinguished Fellow at the Atlantic Council’s Middle East Programs. He returned there in 2025, after being a Deputy Assistant Secretary of Defense for the Middle East at the United States Department of Defense.

Diplomatic posts
Preceded by James Cunningham	United States Ambassador to Israel; 2011–2017	Succeeded by David M. Friedman
