= Ha'Or Ve'HaTzel =

Studio album by Subliminal and Ha'tzel
- Released: 2002
- Genre: Hip-Hop
- Label: Tact Records
- Producer: Kobi Shimony (also exec.); Eddie Sumiren; Ori Shochat; Magic; Harock; Momy Levi; Pini Arnobayev

Subliminal and Ha'tzel chronology
Ha'Or m'Zion (2000)	Ha'Or Ve'HaTzel (2002)	TACT All-Stars (2004)

Ha'Or Ve'HaTzel (Hebrew: האור והצל - The Light and the Shadow) is the second album by the Israeli rapper Subliminal, in collaboration with another Israeli rapper - The Shadow. It was released in 2002.

== Track listing ==
No.	Title	English title	Length
1.	"Hakdama"	Introduction	1:13
2.	"Banu Choshech Legaresh"	We Came To Expel The Darkness	4:18
3.	"Hefred U'mshol"	Divide And Conquer	4:01
4.	"Ani Yachol"	I Can	4:17
5.	"Ha'Finali"	The Finale	4:08
6.	"Tni Li"	Give Me	4:10
7.	"Ha'element Ha'chamishi"	The Fifth Element	0:20
8.	"Hayinu Asinu"	We Were There, We Did It	3:53
9.	"Bor Le'lo Tachtit"	A Bottomless Pit	4:57
10.	"Biladi" (My Country)		2:43
11.	"Non-Stop"	Non-Stop	4:15
12.	"Eddie Dika'on"	Depression Eddie	0:50
13.	"Zazim Im Ha'bass"	Move With The Bass (Bounce)	4:09
14.	"Ha'tzel Mi'tzion"	The Shadow From Zion	0:57
15.	"Lo Tatzlichu La'atzor Oti"	You Won't Succeed In Stopping Me	4:03
16.	"Shumu Shamayim (Ha'archion)"	Lordy Lord (The Archive)	2:50
17.	"Hatzir"	The Hinge	4:33
18.	"Yeled Rechov"	Street Kid	5:19
19.	"Tikva"	Hope	3:56
20.	"Ha'Or Ve'HaTzel"	The Light & The Shadow	6:19
