= Ha'Or m'Zion =

Studio album by Subliminal
- Released: 2000
- Genre: Hip hop

Subliminal chronology
Ha'Or m'Zion (2000)	Ha'Or Ve'HaTzel (2002)

Ha'Or m'Zion (Hebrew: האור מציון - The Light From Zion) is the debut album by Israeli hip-hop artist Subliminal. It was released in 2002 by Helicon Records.

== Track listing ==
No.	Title	English title	Length
1.	"Hakdama"	Introduction	2:36
2.	"Beit Hasefer Hayashan"	The Old School	4:45
3.	"From T.A. To L.A."	From T.A. To L.A.	4:19
4.	"Hollywood"	Hollywood	5:00
5.	"Chai Miyom Leyom"	Living From Day To Day	4:25
6.	"Resume"	Resume	4:52
7.	"From Aleph To Tav"	From A to Z	4:14
8.	"Yoter Mi'chaver"	More Than A Friend	4:12
9.	"Hariviyah Hapotachat Machrizim"	The Opening Quartet Proclaims	1:15
10.	"Ha'Kazablan Shel Shnot Ha'tishim"	Kazablan Of The 90s	4:43
11.	"Ha'adrichalim"	The Architects	3:11
12.	"Banu Choshech Legaresh"	We Came To Expel The Darkness	0:38
13.	"Ha'or"	The Light	3:25
14.	"Aizeh Seret"	What A Movie	4:35
15.	"Lo Poched"	Not Afraid	2:54
16.	"Yoter Mi'chaver"	More Than A Friend	4:31
17.	"Ha'chagiga Nigmeret"	The Celebration Is Over	0:25
