= Shabak Samech =

Israeli rap group (1992-2000, 2007-present)

Shabak Samech שבק"ס
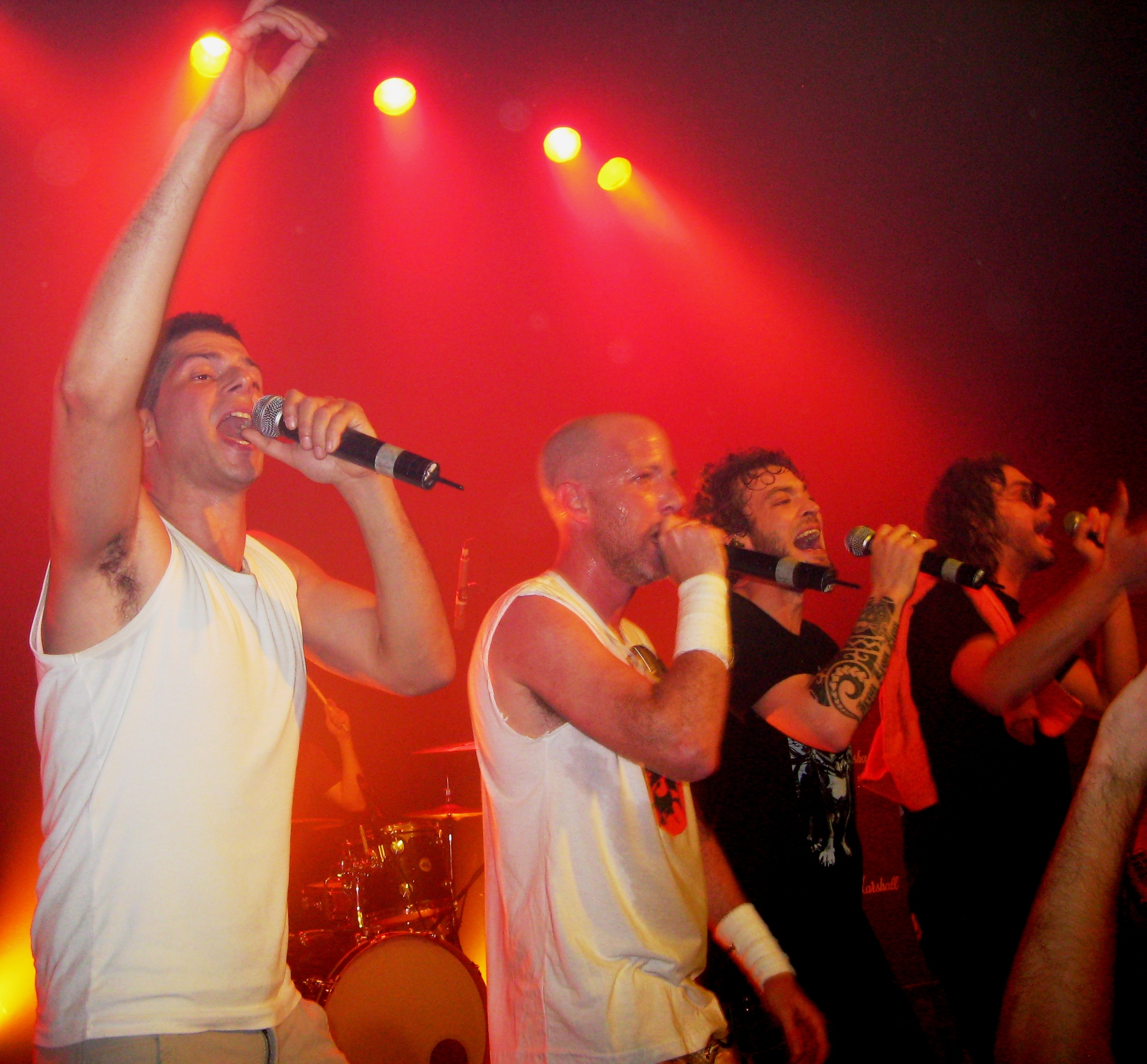
- Shabak Samech during a performance in Be'er Sheva, March 2010

Background information
- Origin: Yavne, Israel
- Genres: Hip-hop; rap rock
- Years active: 1992–2000, 2007–present
- Label: NMC
- Members: Muki D. Nimi Nim; Miro; Fuck A Plompy B. Piloni; James; Davidi
- Past members: Albert; Assaf B.

Shabak Samech (Hebrew: שבק"ס ,שב"ק סמך) (aka Shabak S) is one of the first recognized hip-hop groups to come out of Israel. Their sound is primarily hip-hop, but it includes elements of punk rock, dancehall, ska, and funk. Their sound has been compared to the Beastie Boys and Rage Against the Machine. The group had two and three vocalists (Fuck A and Miro being replaced by Nimi Nim for their second album, Be'atifa shel Mamatak), two guitarists, a drummer and a bassist. The group placed minimal reliance on beats and samples.

The word Shabak as it is written in Hebrew (שבק) is a misspelling of the Hebrew acronym for the Internal General Security Service of Israel.

== Timeline ==
- 1992 – Shabak Samech original members (Plompy, Mook D., Fuck A, Miro, Assaf B. and Albert) form the band, then called "FFM" ("Floating Fat-Man")
- 1993 – Assaf B. leaves and is replaced with Piloni. Davidi joins as bassist, replacing Mook D. (who was playing bass at the time). The name is changed to "Shabak Samech".
- 1994 – Mook D. returns as vocalist, and James joins as drummer, replacing Albert.
- 1995 – First self titled album, Shabak Samech, is recorded in January. First radio airplay is in July, 1995 ("Shin Business" from Shabak 7). The album goes out for sale in September.
- 1996 – Miro leaves and is replaced by Nimi Nim.
- 1997 – Fuck A leaves. The second album, Be'atifa shel Mamatak, is released in August.
- 1998 – Live album released. Nimi Nim leaves late in the year.
- 1999 – Miro and Fuck A return. The band records C'naan 2000.
- 2000 – C'naan 2000 is released.
- 2000 – Shabak Samech disbands. Mook D. goes on to pursue a reggae/rap solo career as Muki.
- 2003 – Mook D. and Piloni start a record label, Shabak Music.
- 2007 – Shabak Samech reunite and have a reunion concert. They began a small tour soon after. The fourth studio album, Boom carnival is released in 2008
- 2012 – Shabak 5th Album, Parra Parra, is released on 1 September.
- On September 24th 2022, the band reunited for a concert at Zappa Live park Rishon Lezion.
- On December 2024, the band released another album titled "Mesibat Sof Ha’olam" (End of the world party).

== Band members ==
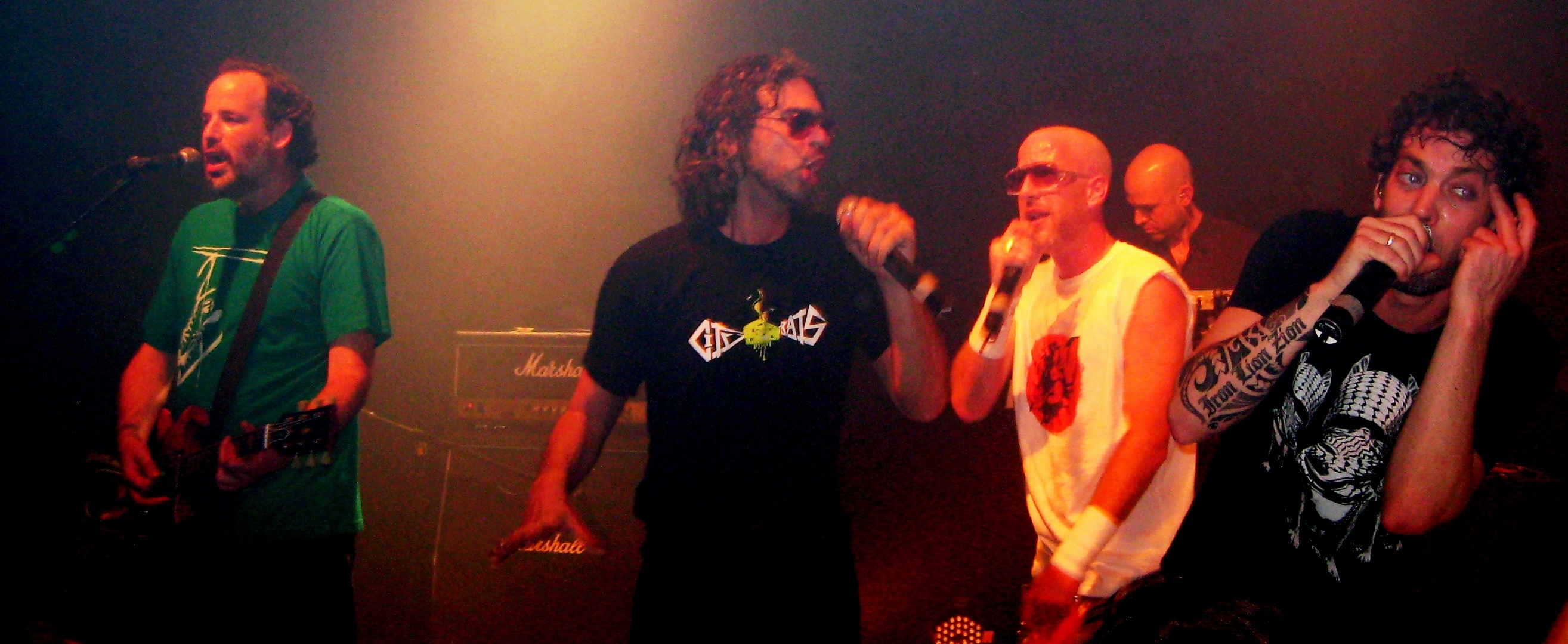
Shabak Samech during a performance in Beer Sheva, March 2010

=== Current members ===
- Nimi Nim aka Nimrod Reshef – vocals (1996–1998, 2007–present)
- Miro aka Amir Yeruham – frontman/vocals (1992–1996, 1999–2000, 2007–present)
- Fuck A aka Chemi aka Kfir Artzi – vocals (1992–1997, 1999–2000, 2007–present)
- Plompy B. aka Amir Besser – guitars (1992–2000, 2007–present)
- Piloni ("Little Elephant") aka Dani Kark – guitars (1993–2000, 2007–present)
- Davidi aka Master David aka David Muskatel – bass (1993–2000, 2007–present)
- Mook D. aka Danny Niv – vocals, bass (1992–2000, 2007–2010, 2012–present)
- James aka Gal Sivan – drums (1995 – present)

=== Former members ===
- Albert – drums (1992–1994)
- Assaf B. – guitars (1992–1993)

== Cultural references ==
Episode 2 of Zahav Shach'or: Sipuro Shel Hahip Hop Hay'israeli described the origin story Shabak Samech.

== Discography ==
- Shabak – 1995
- Be'atifa shel Mamtak (trans: In A Candy Wrapper) – 1997
- Shabak Behofa'a (live album) – 1998
- C'naan 2000 – 2000
- Boom Carnaval – 2008
- Parra Parra – 2012
- Mesibat Sof Ha’olam – 2024

== See also ==
- Israeli hip hop
