= Strong Black Coffee =

Israeli hip hop duo

Strong Black Coffee Café Shahor Hazak קָפֶה שָׁחֹר חָזָק
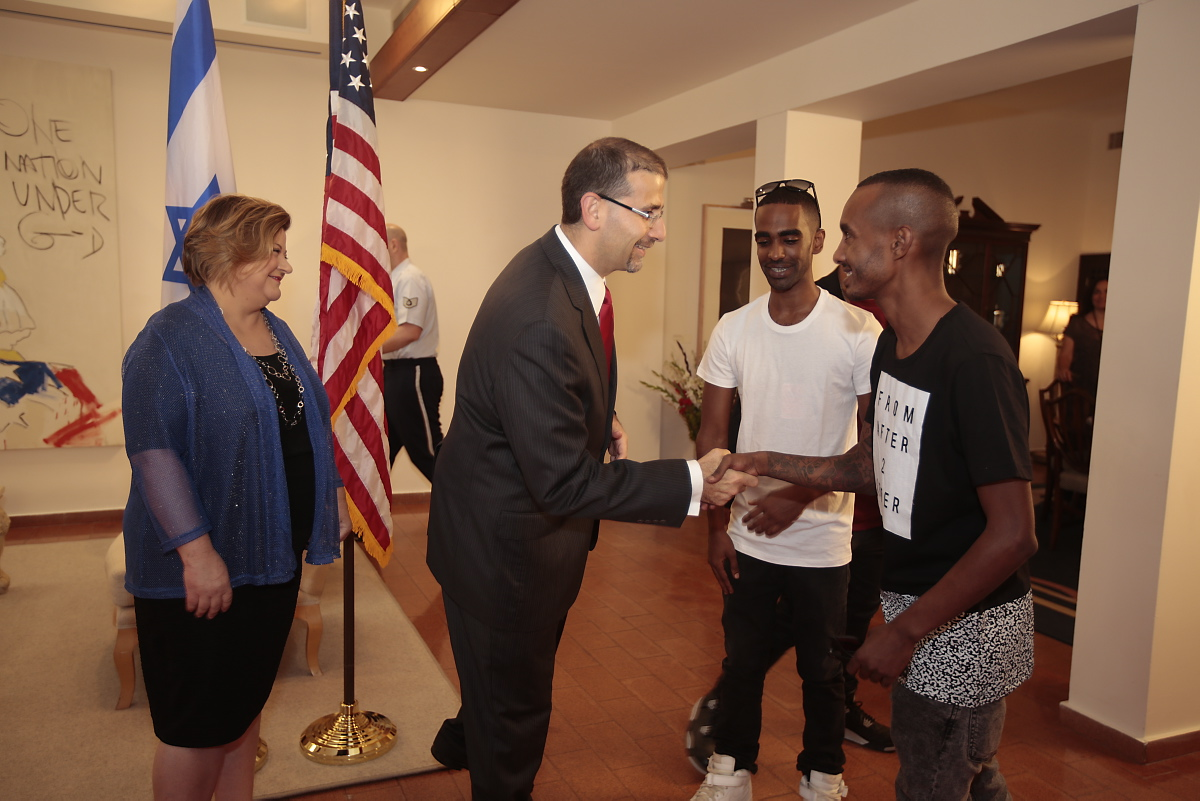
- Strong Black Coffee with the U.S. Ambassador to Israel, Dan Shapiro, at the Ambassador's Residence (July 4, 2015)

Background information
- Origin: Netanya, Israel
- Genres: Hip hop
- Members: Uri Alamo; Ilak Sahalu

Strong Black Coffee (Hebrew: קָפֶה שָׁחֹר חָזָק, Café Shahor Hazak) is an Israeli hip hop duo of Ethiopian origins. The duo was a nominee for the 2015 MTV Europe Music Awards Best Israeli Act award.

== Background ==
The duo consists of Uri Alamo and Ilak Sahalu. The two are cousins and come from an Ethiopian Jewish (Beta Israel) family. Ilak Sahalu was born in 1990 in Ethiopia, while Uri Alamo was born in 1992 in Israel. Ilak Sahalu immigrated to Israel from Ethiopia with his family as a 1 year old baby via Operation Solomon. Both were raised in Netanya, Israel, and served in the Israeli military, with Sahalu serving as an officer. The two now live in Hadera, Israel.

== History ==
They began experimenting with hip-hop music when they were very young. When they were 16 years old they wrote a song in memory of a soldier. The Israeli telecommunications company Cellcom liked the song and sent them to a recording studio, where Sahalu said they met "some bearded musician who explained to us that this thing has rules. That it's a matter of quarters, a certain beat. We started writing according to that logic, and things really did improve." They were introduced to Israeli musicians, did a rap cover for one singer, and shot a music video of it.

Before becoming a rap star, Sahalu was a first lieutenant, platoon commander, and combat officer in the Nahal Brigade of the Israel Defense Forces. He served his last six months on the Home Front Command, at the Central Command headquarters in Jerusalem.

They went on three performance tours in the United States over three years. Sahalu recalled: "We ... performed in Cincinnati ... and there were 800 people in the audience, most of them black. We sang in Hebrew and they screened an English translation. People were surprised. They didn’t even know there are blacks in Israel." The duo then began to record at a recording studio in Hadera. They have now performed in over 20 countries. The two perform every weekend, and earn enough money to get by doing what discharged Israeli soldiers typically do: working as security guards, and in construction.

In July 2015, American R&B singer Chris Brown chose the duo to open a concert of his in Rishon LeZion, Israel. That same month, the U.S. Ambassador to Israel, Dan Shapiro, invited the duo to perform on the Fourth of July at the official residence of the Ambassador. The duo were a nominee for the 2015 MTV Europe Music Awards Best Israeli Act award.

== Music and lyrics ==
The duo's music has been described as "very melodic and fairly soft rap, with clear signs of pop, but ... still a hip-hop band in every way." Their sources of inspiration are Americans Tupac Shakur, Nas, Kendrick Lamar, and LL Cool J, and other Ethiopian-Israeli artists such as the Axum rap ensemble and singer Esther Rada. Though they grew up in a difficult neighborhood, the two say that their music does not speak to the difficulties of growing up in a tough, neglected neighborhood. Elman said: "There always was and always will be racism. The question is whether to sit and cry about it all day long." Sahalu noted: "The first thing that happens when people see Ethiopians singing is that they expect us to say that things are hard for us. But life is beautiful sometimes."

One of the duo's hit songs is "Ihiye Beseder" ("It'll Be Alright"; with a cheerful melody and appealing chorus; lyrics: "I know everything will be okay / Never mind what others say privately / We’ll manage with the help of God"; over 3 million YouTube views by October 2015, 2022 over 24 million). A more recent release of theirs is "Hineh, Zeh Koreh" ("Look, It’s Happening"). "Rak La'alot" ("Just Rise") received 634,000 YouTube views within a few weeks. "Sofshavua" ("Weekend") had 389,000 YouTube views in six months. "The Way You Move" with Israeli rapper Soulja had 545,000 YouTube views in just over three months.
