= Jeremy Cool Habash =

Ethiopian Israeli rapper

Jeremy Cool Habash ג'רמי קול חבש
- Origin: Ethiopia, Israel
- Genres: Hip hop
- Occupation: Rapper

Jeremy Cool Habash (Hebrew: ג'רמי קול חבש) is an Ethiopian Israeli rapper. Habash raps in both Hebrew and Amharic about his Ethiopian Jewish heritage and the struggles that face many Ethiopian Jews in Israel.

Habash’s lyrics do not touch on topics of mainstream rap and instead center on his passion for Judaism, the lives of the youth in Israel, and the difficulties of living as an Ethiopian Jew in Israel. He describes the attraction of Ethiopian youth to hip hop: “Ethiopian youth are attracted to hip-hop as the new expression of our identity.” He explains that Ethiopian-Israeli youth seek to advance themselves through music much like the way African Americans have Habash has taught many immigrant children throughout Israel about hip hop and how to create a song with the hope of empowering them with the ability to uphold their cultural heritage. Habash dreams of one day creating a recording studio for the Ethiopian-Israeli youth.
