= List of hip-hop genres =

List of genres of subgenres, micro, and umbrella terms of rap music.

== Historical time periods ==
- Roots of hip-hop
- Old-school hip-hop
- New-school hip-hop
- Golden age hip-hop

== Subgenres ==
- Alternative hip-hop
  - Experimental hip-hop
  - Hipster hop
- Boom bap
- Bounce
- British hip-hop
  - Road rap
- Chopped and screwed
- Chopper
- Christian hip-hop
- Cloud rap
- Comedy hip-hop
- Crunk
  - Crunkcore
- Digicore
- Drill music
  - Brooklyn drill
  - UK drill
- East Coast hip-hop
- Freestyle rap
- Funk carioca
  - Funk ostentação
- Frat rap
- G-funk
- Hardcore hip-hop
  - Dirty rap
  - Gangsta rap
    - Mafioso rap
  - Horrorcore
  - Memphis rap
- Hyphy
  - Jerkin'
- Internet rap
- Jerk
- Jewish hip-hop
- Instrumental hip-hop
- Latin hip-hop
  - Chicano rap
- Lofi hip-hop
- Miami bass
- Mumble rap
- Nerdcore
  - Chap hop
- Political hip-hop
  - Conscious hip-hop
- Progressive rap
- Slab music
- Snap music
- Southern hip-hop
- Sigilkore
  - Krushclub
- Trap music
  - Latin trap
  - Phonk
  - Plugg
    - Pluggnb
  - Rage
  - Tread rap
- Turntablism
- Underground hip-hop
- West Coast hip-hop

== Fusion genres ==
- Country rap
- Electro
- Emo rap
- Hip-hop soul
  - Neo soul
- Hip house
- Hipdut
- Industrial hip-hop
- Jazz rap
- New jack swing
- Pop rap
- Psychedelic rap
- Punk rap
- Ragga hip-hop
- Rap opera
- Rap rock
  - Rap metal
    - Trap metal
  - Rapcore
- Trip hop

== Derived genres ==
Electronic

- Breakbeat
  - Baltimore club
  - Florida breaks
- Footwork
- Ghetto house
  - Ghettotech
- Glitch hop
- Grime
- Illbient
- Latin freestyle
- Wonky

Rock

- Nu metal

World

- Funk carioca
- Reggaeton
  - Alternative reggaeton
- Mahraganat

== United States regional scenes ==
American hip-hop regional scenes and hip-hop related genres that came from them.

=== Northeastern ===
- East Coast hip-hop
  - New Jersey hip-hop
  - New York City hip-hop
    - Boom bap - from New York City
    - Hardcore hip-hop - from New York City
    - Mafioso rap - from New York City
  - Philadelphia hip-hop
  - Washington, D.C.
  - Baltimore club - from Baltimore, Maryland

=== Midwestern ===
- Midwest hip-hop
- Chopper - from Kansas City, Cleveland, Chicago
- Drill - from the South Side of Chicago
- Detroit hip-hop
- Minneapolis hip-hop
- Omaha hip-hop
- Horrorcore
- Scam rap

=== Southern ===
- Southern hip-hop (Dirty south)
  - Florida
    - Miami bass - from Miami
  - Georgia
    - Trap - from Atlanta
    - Snap - from Atlanta
    - Plugg - from Atlanta
  - Louisiana
    - Bounce - from New Orleans
    - Jigga music - from Baton Rouge
  - Tennessee
    - Crunk - from Memphis
    - Memphis rap - from Memphis
    - Phonk - from Memphis
  - Texas
    - Country rap
    - Chopped and screwed form Houston
    - Slab music

=== Western ===
- West Coast hip-hop
  - California
    - Gangsta rap - from Los Angeles
    - Chicano rap - from East Los Angeles
    - Electro hop - from Los Angeles
    - G-funk - from Pomona, California
    - Mobb music and hyphy - from the San Francisco Bay Area
      - Jerkin' - from Los Angeles
    - Ratchet - from Los Angeles
    - West Coast trap - from Long Beach, California
- Northwest hip-hop - from Oregon and Washington

=== Hawaii ===
- Na mele paleoleo - from Hilo, Hawaii

=== By descent ===
- Asian American hip-hop
- Latino hip-hop
- Native American hip-hop
- Romani hip-hop
- Chicano rap

== World scenes ==
=== Africa ===
- African hip-hop
  - Algerian hip-hop
  - Angolan hip-hop
  - Beninese hip-hop
  - Botswana hip-hop
  - Cape Verdean hip-hop
  - Egyptian hip-hop
  - Gambian hip-hop
  - Gh hip-hop (Ghanaian hip-hop)
  - Guinean hip-hop
  - Ivorian hip-hop
  - Kenyan hip-hop
  - Mauritian hip-hop
  - Moroccan hip-hop
  - Mozambican hip-hop
  - Namibian hip-hop
  - Nigerian hip-hop
    - Port Harcourt hip-hop
  - Nigerien hip-hop
  - Senegalese hip-hop
  - South African hip-hop
  - Tanzanian hip-hop
  - Togolese hip-hop
  - Zambian hip-hop
  - Zimbabwean hip-hop

=== Asia ===
- Asian hip-hop
  - Mongolian hip-hop
  - Azerbaijani hip-hop
  - Bangladeshi hip-hop
  - Burmese hip-hop
  - Chinese hip-hop
  - Hong Kong hip-hop
  - Indian hip-hop
    - Desi hip-hop
  - Indonesian hip-hop
    - Hipdut
  - Japanese hip-hop
  - Korean hip-hop
  - Malaysian hip-hop
  - Nepalese hip-hop
  - Pakistani hip-hop
  - Pinoy hip-hop (Philippine hip-hop)
  - Singapore hip-hop
  - Sri Lankan hip-hop
  - Taiwanese hip-hop
  - Thai hip-hop

=== Europe ===
- European hip-hop
  - Albanian hip-hop
  - Austrian hip-hop
  - Belgian hip-hop
  - Bosnian and Herzegovinian hip-hop
  - British hip-hop
    - Celtic hip-hop
    - Scottish hip-hop
    - Welsh hip-hop
  - Bulgarian hip-hop
  - Croatian hip-hop
  - Czech hip-hop
  - Dutch hip-hop
  - Finnish hip-hop
  - French hip-hop
  - German hip-hop
    - Zeckenrap
  - Greek hip-hop
  - Hip-hop tuga (Portuguese hip-hop)
  - Hungarian hip-hop
  - Icelandic hip-hop
  - Irish hip-hop
  - Italian hip-hop
  - Macedonian hip-hop
  - Montenegrin hip-hop
  - Norwegian hip-hop
  - Polish hip-hop
  - Romanian hip-hop
  - Romany hip-hop
  - Russian hip-hop
  - Serbian hip-hop
  - Slovak hip-hop
  - Slovenian hip-hop
  - Spanish hip-hop
  - Swedish hip-hop
  - Swiss hip-hop
  - Ukrainian hip-hop

=== Middle East ===
- Middle Eastern hip-hop
  - Arabic hip-hop
  - Iranian hip-hop (Persian hip-hop)
  - Israeli hip-hop
  - Lebanese hip-hop
  - Palestinian hip-hop
  - Saudi Arabian hip-hop
  - Tunisian hip-hop
  - Turkish hip-hop
  - Yemeni hip-hop

=== North America ===
- Canadian hip-hop
  - Toronto sound (hip-hop)
- Cuban hip-hop
- Dominican hip-hop
- Haitian hip-hop
- Mexican hip-hop
- Salvadoran hip-hop

=== Oceania ===
- Australian hip-hop
- New Zealand hip-hop
- Samoan hip-hop

=== South America ===
- Latin hip-hop
- South American hip-hop
  - Brazilian hip-hop
    - Brasília hip-hop
  - Colombian hip-hop
  - Chilean hip-hop

== Ethnic fusion genres ==
African

- Bongo Flava - from Tanzania
- Boomba music - from Kenya
- Genge - from Kenya
- Hip-hop galsen - from Senegal
- Hipco - from Liberia
- Hiplife - hip-hop and highlife from Ghana
- Igbo rap - from Southeast Nigeria
- Kwaito - South African house/hip-hop fusion
- Motswako - from Botswana and South Africa
- Zenji flava - from Tanzania

European

- Afroswing - from London
- Gyp-hop - from Romania
- Low bap - from Greece
- Romany hip-hop - by Romani people of Europe
- Songo-salsa - from Spain

North American

- Merenhouse - by Dominican residents of New York City
- Na mele paleoleo - from Hawaii
- Nuyorican rap - by Puerto Ricans of New York City

South American

- Cumbia rap - from Colombia
- Stronda - from Rio de Janeiro
- Vigilante rap - from Brazil

Oceanian

- Urban Pasifika - from New Zealand

== See also ==
- Hip-hop culture
- List of hip-hop festivals
- List of hip-hop musicians
- List of electronic music genres
- List of hip-hop record labels
- Rapping
- List of subcultures
- Classic hip-hop
