= Openair Frauenfeld =

Annual hip hop music festival in Switzerland

Openair Frauenfeld (Out in the Green Festival)
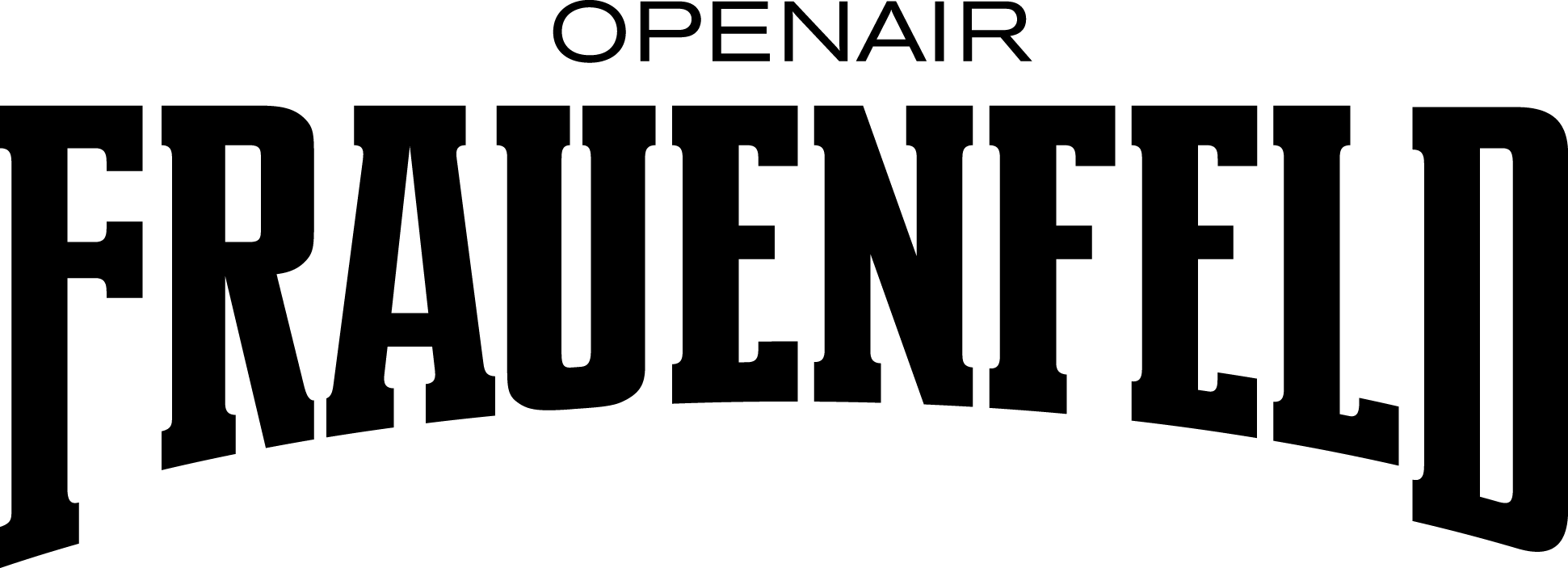
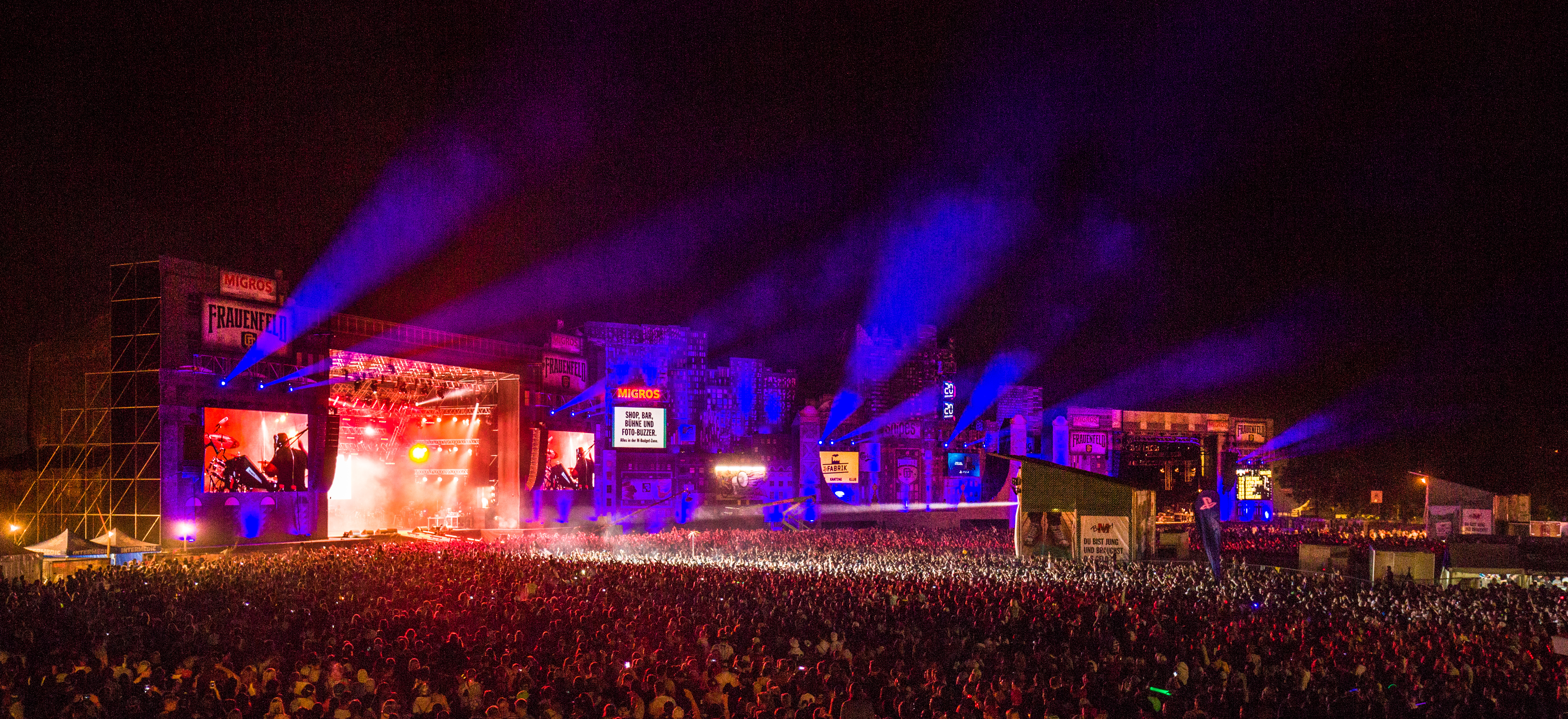
- Genre: Hip hop
- Dates: 2nd Thu–Sat of July
- Locations: Frauenfeld, Switzerland
- Years active: 1985–present (40–41 years)
- Attendance: 130,000–170,000
- Capacity: 150,000
- Organizer: OAFF
- Website: www.openair-frauenfeld.ch

Openair Frauenfeld is an annual hip hop music festival that takes place in Frauenfeld in July. It is considered to be the largest open air festival in Switzerland and the largest hip hop music festival in Europe. The event has been held since 1985. It used to be a rock and blues festival called Out in the Green Festival, which also took place in Winterthur. It was changed to Openair Frauenfeld in 2007. It has hosted numerous high-profile celebrities and has attracted an annual turnout of around 150,000 people. Some of the top headliners who performed at Openair Frauenfeld include Jay-Z, Eminem, Kanye West, Macklemore, Snoop Dogg, 50 Cent, Kendrick Lamar, A$AP Rocky, Travis Scott, Cardi B, Wiz Khalifa, J. Cole, Nicki Minaj, Cypress Hill and others.

== Location ==
The festival takes place in a meadow called "Grosse Allmend" in Frauenfeld. Frauenfeld is the capital city of the canton of Thurgau. Most people travel to the festival by train. There is also limited parking near the festival reserved for festival attendees. Children under the age of sixteen require parental permission in order to attend.

== Artist lineups ==
=== 1987–1999 ===
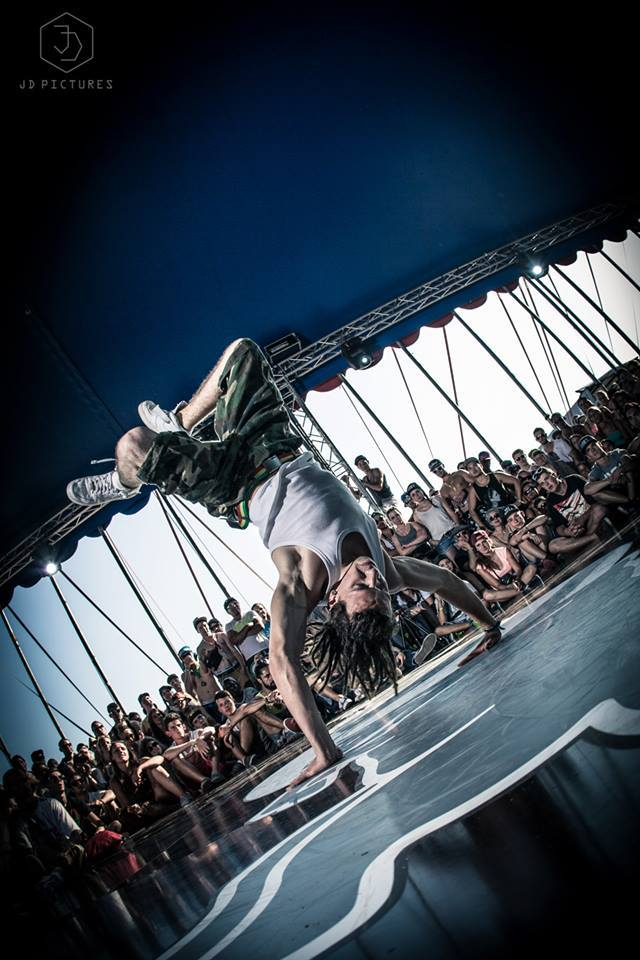
Dansin performing at the festival

- 1987

Marillion, Jimmy Cliff, Third World, Aswad, Lee Perry & the Upsetters, Edoardo Bennato, Status Quo, Blue Öyster Cult, Magnum, Katrina and the Waves, Steel Pulse, Freddie McGregor, Jo Geilo Heartbreakers, Barclay James Harvest, Nils Lofgren

- 1988

The Wailers, The Pogues, Rhapsody, King Sunny Adé, Uriah Heep, Nina Hagen, I.Q., T'pau, Foreigner, Sly & Robbie Package, Polo Hofer, Steve Hacket, Ziggy Marley and the Melody Makers, Ten Years After, Status Quo, Bo Diddley & Ron Wood, Starship, Jethro Tull

- 1991

Simple Minds, Chuck Berry, Status Quo, Foreigner, Bob Geldof, Kid Creole & Coconuts, The Beach Boys, Allmann Brothers Band, John Lee Hooker & Band, Vaya Con Dios, Level 42, Toto, Blues Brothers Band, Mothers Finest, Die Toten Hosen, Manfred Mann's Earthband, Little River Band

- 1993

Lenny Kravitz, The Black Crowes, Chris Isaak, Mr. Big, Inner Circle, Uriah Heep, Björn Again, Midnight Oil, Living Colour, Robert Plant, Faith No More, Big Country, Bryan Adams, Heroes Del Silencio, The Jeff Healy Band, The Kinks, The Beach Boys, Sting, The Hooters

- 1994

Whitesnake

- 1995

R.E.M, Clawfinger, Bo Diddley, The Beautiful South, Paul Weller, Elton John, Inner Circle, Silverchair, Ugly Kid Joe, Pat Travers, The Kelly Family, Rod Stewart, Dream Theater, George Thorogood & The Destr., Vanessa Mae, Faith No More, Oasis, Belly, Megadeth, Sheryl Crow, Page/Plant, The Neville Brothers, Shane Mc Gowan & The Popes, Warrant, Kix, Walter Trout Band, Nathan Cavaleri Vand, Status Quo, Chuck Berry, Slash's Snakepit, The Dubliners

- 1997

David Bowie, Jamiroquai, Die Toten Hosen, Prodigy, Cake Like, Moloko, Blues Traveler, Kula Shaker, Sheryl Crow, Tic Tac Toe, Massive Attack, Jovanotti, Lewis Taylor, Spearhead, Litfiba, Alisha's Attic, Us 3, Skunk Anansie, Faith No More, Steve Winwood, The Bootleg Beatles, Echo & The Bunnymen, Fluke, Reef, Apollo 440, Rammstein

- 1998

The Rolling Stones, Pur, Deep Purple, Eros Ramazzotti, Björk, Joe Cocker, Bob Dylan, Iggy Pop, Dave Matthews Band, Richie Sambora, Stroke, Propellerheads, Gang Starr, Transister, Anouk, K's Choice, Elisa, Joaquin Cortes, Angelique Kidjo, Les Sauterelles, Eagle- Eye Cherry, Jazzkantine, Clawfinger

=== 2000–2009 ===
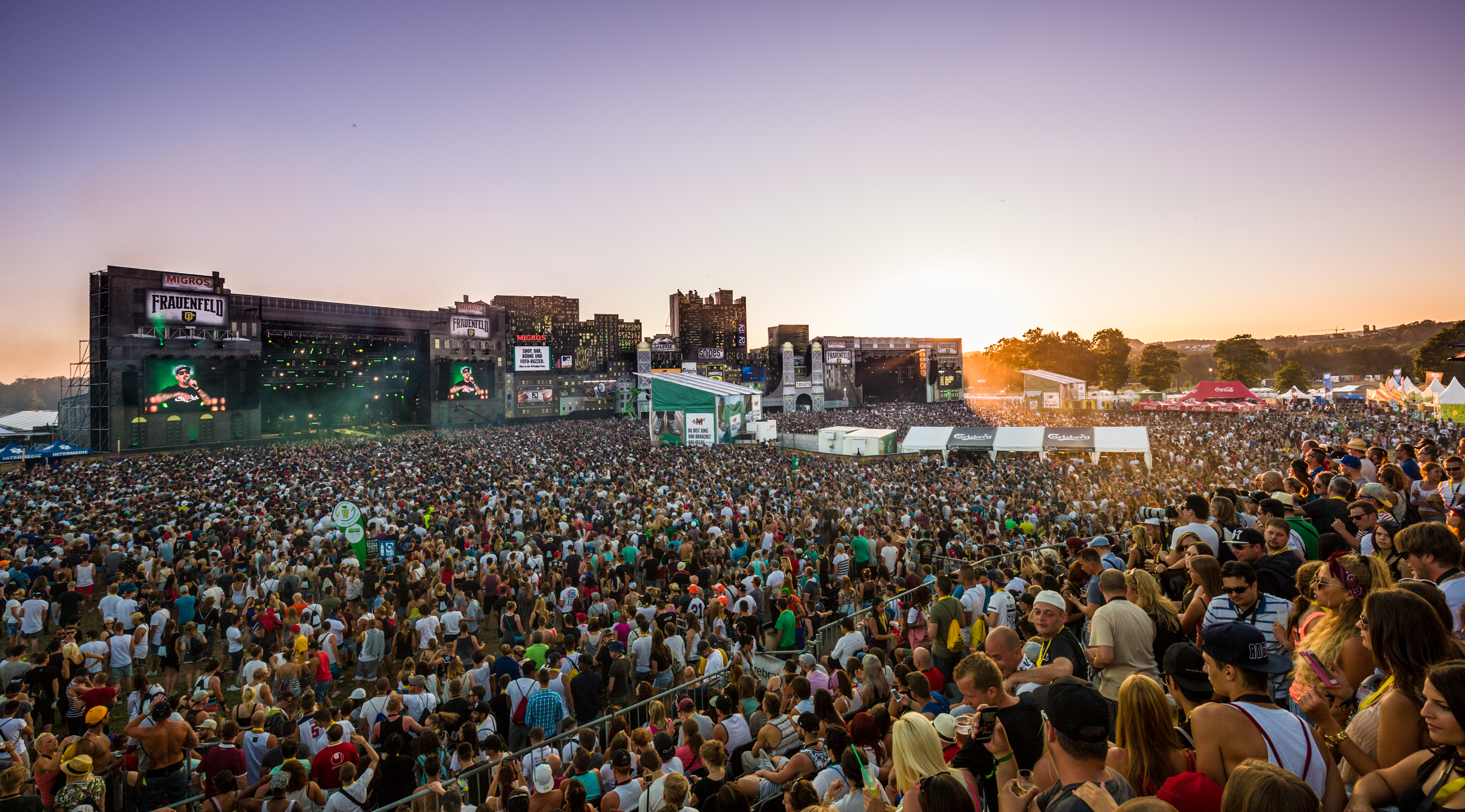
Cypress Hill performing at Frauenfeld 2015

- 2000

James Taylor Quartet, Dog Eat Dog, Bloodhound Gang, Die Fantastischen Vier, Liz Libido, Subzonic, Björn Again, The Corrs, Alanis Morissette, Guano Apes, Betty Legler, Bananafishbones, Polo Hofer Und Schmetterband, Echt, The Cranberries

- 2002

Rammstein, Shane MacGowan & The Popes, Cake, Gotthard, The Cure, Maja, Dada (Ante Portas), "A", Px-Pain, Backyard Babies, Therapy?, Clawfinger, Soulfly, Bush, Morris, Subzonic, Dream Theater, Faithless, Simple Minds, Orange Marmalade, Custommade Noise, Mild In Taste, P.M.T, Wake, Redwood, Mother Kingdom, Shruti Tribe, Twisted, Silver Inc., Roach

- 2004

Pink, Söhne Mannheims, Cypress Hill, Motörhead, Guano Apes, HIM, Mary J Blige, Beginner, Gentleman, Oomph!, Die Happy, Sektion Kuckikäschtli, Asian Dub Foundation Ss, Orishas, Habib Koite, Sergent Garcia, Sheva, Pauline Taylor, Wurzel 5, Züri Slang Karaoke Superstars, Manou Gallo, Bligg, Adrian Stern, Seven, Fat Man Scoop, Beatnuts, Black Tiger, Pete Penicka, Emashie, Tambours De Brazza, Coulibaly, Sam Tschabalala & Sabeka, Musafir, Cut Killer/Abdel, Treekillaz", Carmen Fenk, Miss Moneypenny

- 2005

Snoop Dogg, Jovanotti, Nightwish, Fettes Brot, In Extremo, Papa Roach, Samy Deluxe, Max Herre, Silbermond, Slunt, Helmet, Looptroop, Bagatello, The Scrucialists, Seven, Phenomden, Les Babacools, Trafficlights, Gigi Moto, Bauers, Florian Ast, Sandee

- 2006

Black Eyed Peas, Busta Rhymes, Die Fantastischen Vier, Wir Sind Helden, Sportfreunde Stiller, Boodhound Gang, Gentleman, The Darkness, Kelis, Saian Supa Crew, Dog Eat Dog, Curse, Clawfinger, Joy Denalane, Double Pact, Cunninlynguists, The Locos, Gleiszwei, Godessa & Guests, Baze, Radio 200000, Breitbild, Gimma, Wurzel 5, Open Season, Chulcha Candela, Core 22, Akala, Mabon

- 2007

The Prodigy, Akon, Sean Paul, Seeed, Mando Diao, The Roots, Redman, The Rasmus, Bushido, SINIK, Sido, Juli, Freundeskreis, EPMD, Samy Deluxe, The Sounds, TOK, Papoose, Gimma, Clueso, Dendemann, Sugarplum Fairy, Puppetmastaz, Karpatenhund, Bligg, Samurai, Liricas Analas, Triplenine, 6er Gascho, Griot, Cigi & Straight outta Mama, Famara

- 2008

Jay-Z, Wu-Tang Clan, Cypress Hill, The Hives, Jan Delay & Disko No 1, Ice Cube, IAM, Common, Stress, Fettes Brot, Patrice, Looptroop, Culcha Candela, Dynamite Deluxe, Stephen Marley, Blumentopf, Kool Savas, Dog Eat Dog, General Degree, Sektion Kuchikäschtli, Swollen Members, Ce'Cile, K.I.Z, Breitbild, Cool Kids, Die Happy, Revolverheld, OBK, Le Peuple De L'Herbe, Chlyklass, Karamelo Santo, Radio 200000, Disgroove, Madd Family, Semantik, Manillio

- 2009

Kanye West, 50 Cent, Lil Wayne, Gentleman, Sido, N.E.R.D, The Game, La Coka Nostra, Deichkind, Jedi Mind Tricks, Turbonegro, Bligg, Immortal Technique, Hilltop Hoods, Sammy DEluxe, Madcon, Gimma, Dendemann, Prinz Pi, Phenomden, Lircas Analas, Nega

=== 2010–present ===
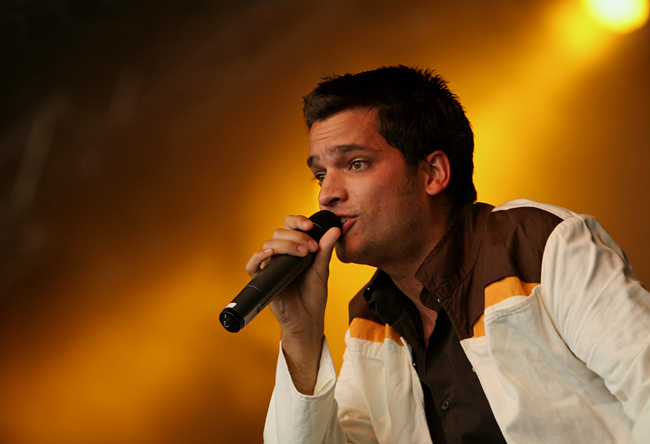
Open Season at Openair Frauenfeld 2006

- 2010

Eminem, Jay Z, Die Fantastischen Vier, Nas, Damien Marley, Jan Delay, Raekwon, Diam's, Dizzee Rascal, IAM, Culcha Candela, Stress, Hilltop Hoods, D12, Samy Deluxe, Wale, KIZ, Tech N9ne, Marcelo D2, The Knux, Ebony Bones!, Clipse, Hocus Pocus, Brother Ali, Irie Révoltés, Gimma & Friends, Breitbild, Greis, Jahcoustix, The Yard Vibes Crew, Larry F, Casper, Bandit, Blue King Brown, Urthboy

- 2011

Snoop Dogg, Cypress Hill, Wu-Tang Clan, The Roots, Ice Cube, Taio Cruz, Pitbull, Lupe Fiasco, Black Star, Deichkind, Public Enemy, Big Boi, M.O.P., Bushido, Soprano, Kool Savas, Ziggy Marley, Sens Unik, Samy Deluxe, Far East Movement, OFWGKTA, Jay Electronica, Yeawolf, Curren$y, Marteria, Snowgoons, Atmosphere, Ryan Leslie, Cunninlynguists, AZAD, F.R., Tommy Vercetti, LDDC

- 2012

Drake, 50 Cent, NAS, Sean Paul, Rick Ross, Wiz Khalifa, Mos Def, J. Cole, Beginner, Sido, Mac Miller, Tinie Tempah, Jedi Mind Tricks, Max Herre, Samy Deluxe, K.I.Z., Marsimoto, Yeawolf, Hilltop Hoods, A$AP Rocky, Royce da 5'9", Lords of the Underground, Dilated Peoples, Beenie Man, Phenomden, Soja, Lady Saw, Steff la Cheffe, Macklemore

- 2013

Snoop Lion, Seeed, Run Dmc, Jurassic 5, Tyga, A$AP Rocky, B.o.B, C2C, Wu-Tang Clan, A Tribe Called Quest

- 2014

Outkast, Macklemore & Ryan Lewis, Pharrell Williams, NAS, T.I, Wiz Khalifa, M.I.A, Cro, Kid INk, Schoolboy Q, IAM, YG, Iggy Azalea, A$AP Ferg, Chance the Rapper, Joey Bada$$

- 2015

Kendrick Lamar, Nicki Minaj, A$AP Rocky, Cypress Hill, Casper, Deichkind, The Roots, Jason Derulo, Ludacris, Pusha T, Tinie Tempah, C2C, Danny Brown, Rae Sremmurd, August Alsina, G-Eazy, Logic, Travi$ Scott, Flattbush Zombies, D12

- 2016

Macklemore & Ryan Lewis, 50 Cent, Major Lazer, J. Cole, Wiz Khalifa, Future, Sido, K.I.Z., Bryson Tiller, Mobb Deep, Kool Savas, Young Thug, A$AP Ferg, Genetikk, Ghostface Killah, Action Bronson, Ty Dolla $ign, Blumentopf, Lo & Leduc, Yelawolf, Hopsin, Cunninlynguists, Mick Jenkins, Dodo, Elijah

- 2017

The Weeknd, NAS, Casper, Travis Scott, Cro, G-Eazy, Gucci Mane, Maître Gims, Marteria, Mac Miller, Bushido & Shindy, Rae Sremmurd, 187 Strassenbande, Bonez MC & Raf Camora, Flatbush Zombies, Fler, MHD, Machine Gun Kelly, Talib Kwelli & The Soul Rebels, Desiigner, Lil Yachty, Hilltop Hoods, Kontra K, Lady Leshurr, Lil Dicky, Nimo, Olexesh, UFO361, KMN Gang, SXTN, Yung Hurn

- 2018

Eminem, J. Cole, Wiz Khalifa, Migos, Lil Uzi Vert, Skepta, French Montana, Ty Dolla $ign, Joey Bada$$, Playboi Carti, Action Bronson, Genetikk, Prinz Pi, Denzel Curry, Haftbefehl, Blackbear, Belly, Rin, Coley, Lil Xan, Iamddb, Capital Bra, Physical Shock, SUmmer Cem, Miami Yacine, Luciano, Ski Mask the Slump God, Bausa, Dreezy, AJ Tracey, Veysel, Bas, Cashi, Dardan, Celo & Abdi, Tommy x Dez X CBN, Stereo Luchs, Kalim, Knackeboul, Ali, Junglepussy, Ahzumjot, Kelvyn Colt, Effe, Danitsa, Yung Hurn

- 2019

Cardi B, Stormzy, Travis Scott, Bonez MC & RAF Camora, Future, Marteria & Casper, Rae Sremmurd, Tyga, Young Thug, 102 Boyz, Azet & Zuna, BHZ, Buds Penseur, Davey600, Didi, Duckwrth, End, Fero47, Flatbush Zombies, G-Eazy, Cobee, Gunna, J.I.D., Jay Rock, Joey Purp, Juju, KC Rebell, Khea, KT Gorique, Lance Butters, Lcone, Leezy, LGoony, Lil Baby, Little Simz, Luuk, Manillio, Mero, Monet192, MoTrip & Ali As, Nura, Octavian, OG Keemo, Pronto, Rich the Kid, Saba, Saweetie, Scarlxrd, Serious Klein, Sheck Wes, Slimka, $uicideboy$, THEY., Trettmann, Trippie Redd, Ufo361, YBN Cordae, YG

== See also ==
- List of hip hop festivals
