= Islamic hip-hop =

Islamic hip hop may refer to:

- Islam and hip hop in the United States
- Middle Eastern hip hop
- IAM
- Islamic Force
- Dirty Kuffar
- Salome MC
- Jihadism and hip hop
