= Salka Sól Eyfeld =

Icelandic singer, actress, voice actress, radio host, and television presenter

Salka Sól
- Born: Salka Sól Eyfeld Hjálmarsdóttir; 18 April 1988 (age 38); Reykjavík, Iceland
- Occupations: Actress, TV-presenter, radio-host, voice actress, singer, rapper
- Years active: 2001–present
- Known for: Trapped, Amabadama
- Father: Hjálmar Hjálmarsson

Salka Sól Eyfeld Hjálmarsdóttir (born 18 April 1988), sometimes known simply as Salka Sól, is an Icelandic singer, actress, voice actress, radio host and TV-presenter. She is known as the front figure of bands AmabAdamA and Reykjavíkurdætur and for her role as Soffía, Hjörtur's new girlfriend, in Trapped.

== Early life ==
Salka Sól was born in Reykjavík, Iceland but moved to Kópavogur when she was 7 years old. She never really found her place in Kópavogur and was bullied in school.

She is the daughter of actor and voice actor Hjálmar Hjálmarsson. She is the eldest of three children two brothers (b.1993), (b.2001). Despite starting acting at an early age, she once said in an interview that she never intended to become an actor when she was a child, but rather a teacher, like her mother. Although it was great fun knowing her father was one of the Icelandic voices of Toy Story and seeing him on TV in the annual New Year's Eve sketch show Áramótaskaupið.

When Salka Sól was in middle school, she joined the school band. In breaks, she would try out different instruments and teach herself to play them.

She went to Fjölbrautarskólinn í Breiðholti and won the school's singing contest. At college, she was involved in musicals and plays.

After college, she moved to London to study acting musicianship. She was the first Icelander to receive a bachelor's degree in that subject.

== Career ==
Salka Sól had been rapping for fun with her friends. Together, they hosted a series of women's rap nights at a bar in Reykjavík. There, she discovered that she had a talent for rapping. The result of these rap nights was the formation of the rap group Reykjavíkurdætur (transl. Daughters of Reykjavík). The rap group has been in the media several times due to people's reactions to their bold sexual lyrics. Currently, Salka Sol is a judge in the Voice Iceland, and this show is being famous spreading to the world.

While working with Reykjavíkurdætur, Salka Sól met producer Magnús Jónson. He was a member of the reggae band AmabAdamA, with his girlfriend Steinunn. "I just joined the band. AmabAdamA wasn't really happening and when I joined it was like a puzzle piece that had been missing" Shortly after Salka Sól joined, the band released the single Hossa Hossa which became a big hit in Iceland. In 2014, the band was nominated in several categories at the Icelandic Music Awards. Among them Salka Sól as Female Vocalist of the Year, and AmabAdamA as Newcomer of the Year.

Salka Sól became an experienced voice actor (like her father) and has voiced Icelandic versions of films like The Lego Movie, Monsters, Inc., and Wreck-It Ralph.

After a short career as a TV-presenter at the short lived Icelandic TV-station Bravó, Salka Sól got interested in radio work. She overheard a phone conversation where a radio host she knew was talking about his radio show needing a woman to fill in over the summer. "After he hung up I kinda pleaded "pick me, pick me" like a little child and got the gig". She became known for rapping the news of the week on Friday mornings. This work later landed her a co-host job with broadcaster RÚV.

In 2014, Salka Sól was awarded "Town Artist" by the town of Kópavogur.

In 2015, Salka Sól was one of four judges in the Icelandic version of The Voice. She was also involved in two productions on stage at the National Theater of Iceland. She co-hosted the Icelandic national selection for the Eurovision Song Contest (Söngvakeppnin), and she won Female Vocalist of the year at the Icelandic Music Awards.

== Filmography ==
=== Television ===
- Trapped (2015-2016) (TV-series) as Soffía

=== Voice acting (Icelandic voice) ===
- The Lorax (2012) as Audrey
- Wreck-It Ralph (2012)
- Monsters University (2013) as Carrie
- The Lego Movie (2014) as Unikitty
- Big Hero 6 (2014) as Honey Lemon
- Hotel Transylvania 2 (2015) as Mavis
- Home (2015) as Gratuity "Tip" Tucci
- Inside Out (2015) as Forgetter Paula
- Ralph Breaks the Internet (2018) as Yesss
- Encanto (2021) as Mirabel Madrigal
- Ruby Gillman, Teenage Kraken (2023) as Chelsea Van Der Zee

== Personal life ==
In 2019, Salka Sól married Arnar Freyr Frostason, a rapper from the band Úlfur Úlfur. They have two children.
