= Fakker =

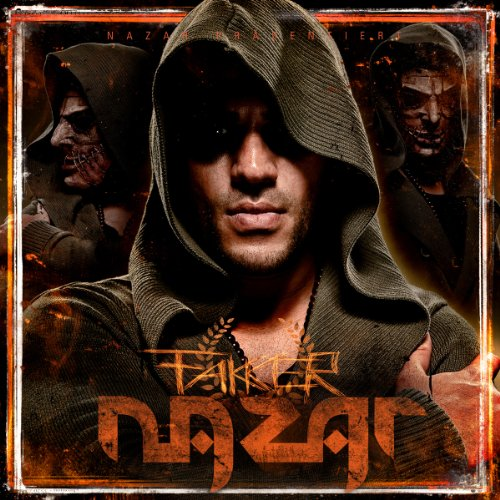

Studio album by Nazar
- Released: 13 May 2011
- Recorded: 2010 and 2011
- Studio: Besenkammer-Studio, Vienna
- Genre: Hip hop
- Length: 53.23 minutes
- Label: Wolfpack Entertainment
- Producer: RAF 3.0; The Royals; Nazar; X-Plosive; Benno; Undercover Molotov; Gee Futuristic; Hookbeats; STI; Tua; Veritas

Nazar chronology
| Artkore (2010) | Fakker (2011) |

Fakker is the third solo album by the Austrian hip-hop musician Nazar. It was released on 13 May 2011 by Wolf Pack Entertainment and distributed by Soulfood Music In the summer of 2010 a new track of Nazar's, entitled My Town was released on YouTube. In the following months, Nazar began work with RAF Camora and The Royals on his new solo album. Prior to the album release came the opening of the Austrian documentary Schwarzkopf in cinemas.

The album reached 6th in the Ö3 Austria Top 40, and 36th in the German Media Control Charts.

== Track listing ==
| Track number | Title | Featuring | Producer | Length |
|---|---|---|---|---|
| 1 | Intro | | Raf Camora, The Royals, Nazar | 1:36 |
| 2 | Meine Fans (My Fans) | | Raf Camora, The Royals | 2:45 |
| 3 | Krankes Ego (Sick Ego) | RAF 3.0 | Raf Camora, The Royals, Benno | 3:26 |
| 4 | Exhibitionist | | Raf Camora, The Royals, X-Plosive | 3:39 |
| 5 | F.O.T.U. | Haftbefehl | Raf Camora, The Royals | 4:00 |
| 6 | Farben des Lebens (Colors of Life) | RAF 3.0 | Molotov | 3:14 |
| 7 | Amethyst | | Gee Futuristic and Hookbeats | 2:57 |
| 8 | Keinen Bock (Do Not Block) | Manuellsen | Raf Camora, The Royals | 3:40 |
| 9 | Fakkerlifestyle | RAF 3.0 | Raf Camora, The Royals | 3:08 |
| 10 | Volim Te (I Love You) | | STI | 3:38 |
| 11 | Gib mir nicht die Schuld (I Do Not Give the Blame) | RAF 3.0 | Raf Camora, The Royals | 3:02 |
| 12 | Nazarfakker Pt. 2 | | | 3:21 |
| 13 | Sprinten und Fallen (Sprinting and Falling) | | Tua | 3:01 |
| 14 | Comic-Helden aus dem Solarium (Comic Book Heroes From the Solarium) | Farid Bang & Summer Cem | Raf Camora, The Royals | 4:13 |
| 15 | Flammen über Wien Pt. 3 (Flame of Vienna Pt. 3) | Raf Camora | Veritas | 2:55 |
| 16 | Gib mir die Welt (Give Me the World) | | Raf Camora, The Royals | 3:21 |
| 17 | Outro | | Raf Camora, The Royals and Nazar | 1:26 |

== Production ==
The majority of the album production was by Raf Camora, The Royals and Nazar. Nazar and Camora produced the titles Meine Fans, F.O.T.U, Keinen Bock, Fakkerlifestyle, Gib mir nicht die Schuld, Comic-Helden aus dem Solarium and Gib mir die Welt together with The Royals. They received support during the Intro and Outro by Nazar, in Krankes Ego by Benno and Exibitionist by X-plosives. Another Beat was contributed by Undercover Molotov. This is the title assigned to the Farben des Lebens. The beat of Amethyst comes from Gee Futuristic and Hookbeats. Tua took over the production of Sprinten und Fallen and Flammen über Wien Pt. 3rd. Lastly, STI was responsible for the background music of Volim Te. The guitar used in it was played by Raf Camora.

== Chart performance ==
| Chart (2011) | Peak position |
|---|---|
| Austrian Albums (Ö3 Austria) | 6 |
| German Albums (Offizielle Top 100) | 36 |
