= Icelandic hip-hop =

Icelandic hip-hop is hip-hop culture from Iceland, which includes hip-hop and rapping, breakdancing by b-girls and b-boys, and graffiti artists and graffiti writers. Early hip-hop groups included Quarashi, Subterranean, Team 13 (which later became Twisted Minds), Multifunctionals, Oblivion, Bounce Brothers and Hip Hop Elements (later named Kritikal Mazz). The next generation of hip-hop performers, notably BlazRoca and Sesar A, rapped in Icelandic. XXX Rottweiler and Sesar A published the first all Icelandic hip-hop albums in 2001. Subsequent artists included Bæjarins bestu, Móri, Afkvæmi Guðanna (The Offspring of the Gods), Bent og 7Berg (Bent and 7Berg), Skytturnar (The Marksmen), Hæsta Hendin (The Highest Hand) and Forgotten Lores. MGísli Palmi, Þriðja Hæðin (The Third Floor), Cell 7, Kilo, Shadez of Reykjavík, Úlfur Úlfur, and Emmsjé Gauti. Icelandic lyrics are usually very direct and aggressive, with battle raps. An important hip-hop events is Rímnaflæði in Miðberg, a freestyle competition. Element Crew has been the leading B-boy crew since 1998. The graffiti scene started 1991 with graffiti writers such as ONE, Pharokees, Atom, Sharq, Kez and Youze.

== History ==
The first mainstream hip-hop crew from Iceland was Quarashi, who were inspired by the rock hybrid music of Beastie Boys and Rage Against the Machine. Around the same time, Quarashi released their first album, several rap groups were formed such as Subterranean which are considered to have released one of Icelandic hiphop's biggest classics, Central Magnetizm. Other groups included Team 13 (which later became Twisted Minds), Multifunctionals, Oblivion, Bounce Brothers and Hip Hop Elements (later named Kritikal Mazz). They all rapped in English except for one song from Multifunctionals called "Númer 1." During that time the first crew rapping entirely in Icelandic came forward with aggressive radio singles: that band was Sækópah and consisted of the rappers BlazRoca and Sesar A. Shortly thereafter, they formed SupahSyndikal along with members of Subterranean and Tríó Óla Skans. BlazRoca and Sesar A were vital to the second generation of artists that defined itself by rapping in Icelandic.

XXX Rottweiler (formerly known as 110 Rottweilerhundar), along with Sesar A, published the first all Icelandic hip-hop albums in Iceland in 2001. In 2002 a new wave of rappers had followed their lead by rapping exclusively in Icelandic: Bæjarins bestu, the freestyle battle champs of Iceland in one unit, Móri, a gangsta rapper who uses Icelandic, Afkvæmi Guðanna (The Offspring of the Gods), Bent og 7Berg (Bent and 7Berg), Skytturnar (The Marksmen), Hæsta Hendin (The Highest Hand) and Forgotten Lores. Most of these groups have stopped making music, and other artists and bands have started to make a name for themselves in the Icelandic hip-hop culture. The most active artists today include Gísli Palmi, Þriðja Hæðin (The Third Floor), Cell 7, Kilo, Shadez of Reykjavík, Úlfur Úlfur, Aron Can, GKR, Alexander Jarl, Agust Bent and Emmsjé Gauti. Icelandic lyrics are usually very direct and aggressive, with battle raps forming a sizable portion of Icelandic hip-hop.

One of the largest hip-hop events is Rímnaflæði in Miðberg, a freestyle competition where young MCs and rap bands (usually ages sixteen and younger) compete by rapping a single song on stage. The first jury was made up of Sesar A, BlazRoca (XXX Rottweiler hundar) and Omar Swarez (Quarashi).

== Subgenres ==
Icelandic hip-hop culture also includes active scenes with their own subculture.

=== Breakdance ===
Element Crew is the leading b-boy crew (since 1998) under the leadership of Gretski. Breakdancing was first seen on Iceland around 1983. It grew popular in a short amount of time, but by the beginning of the 1990s it had all but faded out. Around 1997, breakdancing began to grow more popular, with Shakers Crew.

=== Graffiti ===
The Graffiti scene first took off in Iceland around 1991 with writers such as ONE, Pharokees, Atom, Sharq, Kez and Youze. Crews such as SR (Stash Riders) and LCF (Le Circle Ferme) were the first big influentials. Then around 1997 TMC (Twisted Minds Crew) broke out with members Senze and Natur being the most active. In the same year CAN Crew (Can Armed Ninjas) was formed by Sketz and Sare One. Sare One is known today as Nores and is now a member of the TMC. With his arrival on the scene the style took a big step forward and he is the most potent individual for Icelandic Graffiti. Foreign artists who have temporarily lived in Iceland have also made an impact, notably Kegr and Jiroe.
