= Felukah (musician) =

Egyptian rapper and singer

- Born: Sara Elmessiry; Cairo, Egypt
- Origin: Cairo, Egypt
- Genres: Hip hop; neo-soul; R&B; pop
- Occupations: Rapper; singer; songwriter; poet
- Instrument: Vocals
- Years active: 2018–present
- Labels: Abu Recordings; Create Music Group
- Website: felukah.com

Felukah is an Egyptian rapper, singer and poet.

== Early life and education ==
Felukah was born in Cairo. Her stage name references the felucca (felukah) sailing boats associated with the Nile. She moved to New York City in 2017 and studied creative writing at The New School and Hunter College.

Alongside music, she has published poetry under the pseudonym Kahirati.

== Career ==
Felukah began releasing music independently online and performed in Cairo before relocating to the United States. Her early releases included the project Battery Acid (2018).

She draws from Middle Eastern hip-hop and Afrofuturism, describing Erykah Badu as a mentor.

She released her debut album Acid Battery in 2018, Citadel in 2019. In 2021, she released Dream 23 with Abu Recordings.

In 2021, she collaborated with Palestinian rapper The Synaptik as part of a Shubbak Festival commission, which also included a live performance at London's Jazz Cafe.

Felukah has sampled and collaborated with many artists from the SWANA region, including Ma-Beyn, Nayomi, Dounia, and Nadine El Roubi. She collaborated with Danna Paola and Tamtam in a cover of "A Kind of Magic" for the 2022 FIFA World Cup.

Felukah subsequently released Love Serum in 2023, and Qabl Al Shams (Before The Sun) in 2024, rapping in both English and Arabic. In 2024, she performed at the Recording Academy's 2025 Right Here, Right Now Global Climate Summit.

Later in 2024 she launched her first headlining tour, titled Qabl El Shams.

Felukah recorded her 2026 album Hibiskiss in Cairo after living in New York for almost nine years. It includes collaborations with Xiuhtezcatl Martinez, Lana Lubany, and Tära (“Sahara”).

== Discography ==
=== Albums and EPs ===
Year	Title	Type	Label
2018	Battery Acid	Mixtape / project	
2019	Citadel	Studio album	
2020	Dream 23	Studio album	Abu Recordings
2021	Kawkab	EP	Abu Recordings
2022	The Love Serum	Studio album	Felukah
2024	Qabl El Shams	EP	Felukah Music / Create Music Group

=== Selected singles ===
Year	Single	Notes
2022	"A Kind of Magic (Coke Studio Mix for the FIFA World Cup 2022™)"	with Danna Paola and Tamtam

== Awards and nominations ==
- Musivv Awards – Regional Artist of the Year: "Sterlini" (winner; 3rd Musivv Awards).
