= Mazen El Sayed =

Lebanese hip-hop artist

Mazen El Sayed, also known as El Rass, is a Lebanese hip-hop artist with over 200 singles and 9 albums to date. El Rass' incorporation of both Classical Arabic and modern street slang in his lyrics has resulted in scholarly attention regarding his music as works of poetry.

Arab News listed his album Ard El Khof in their list of best Arab alternative albums of 2022.

== Biography ==
El Rass was born in 1984 in Tripoli, Lebanon to a kindergarten teacher and a left-wing Arab nationalist engineer. According to El Rass, he attended one of the best high schools in Tripoli, a French lyceum. After 7 years in Paris where he studied and worked as a banker, he returned to Lebanon to dedicate himself to music and journalism.

== See also ==
- Lebanese hip hop
