= Romani music =

Music of the Romani people

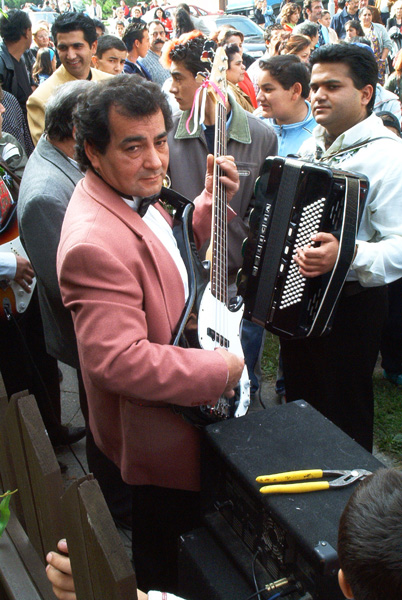
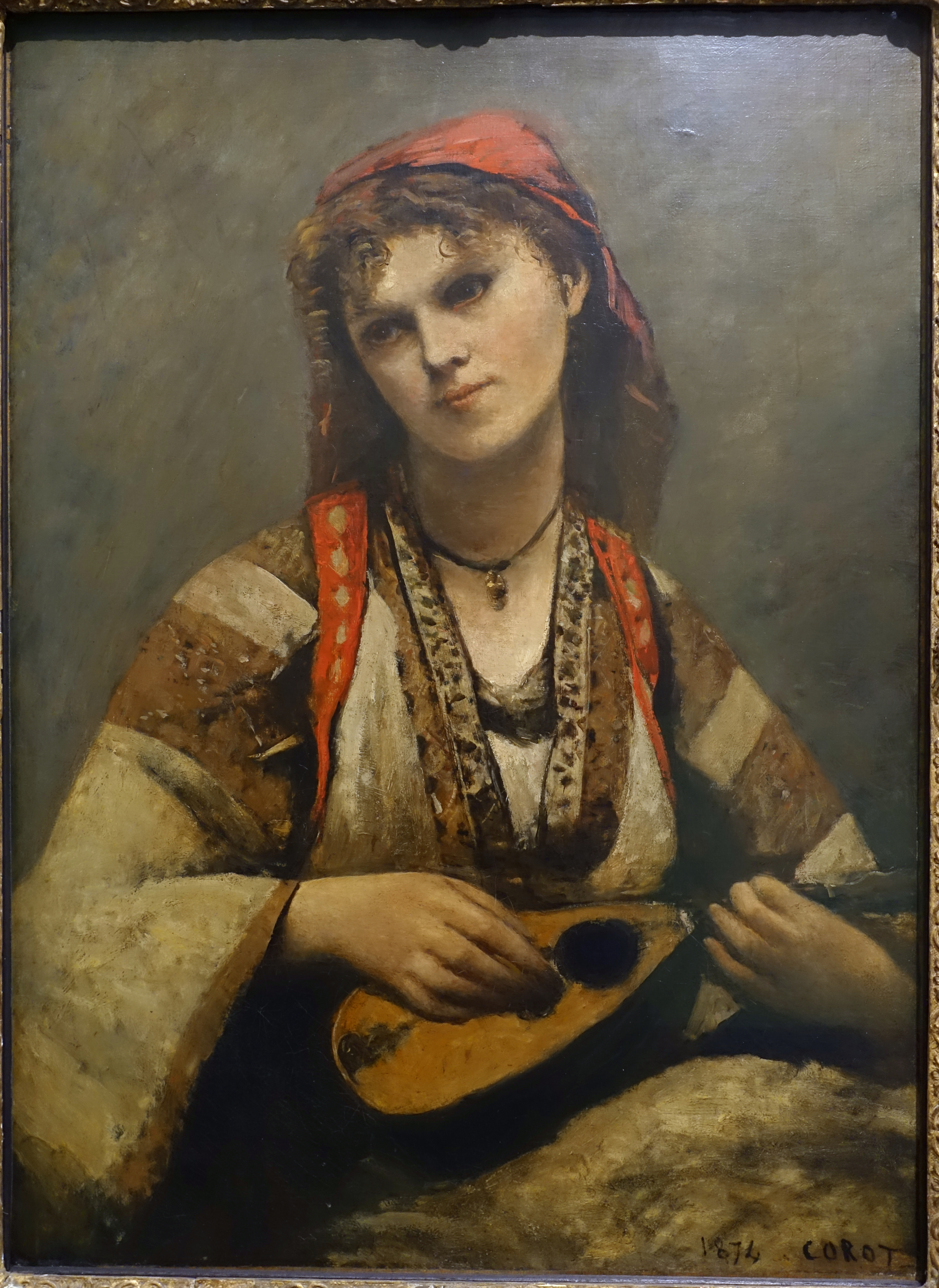
Romani musicians at a wedding in the Czech Republic in 2005 (left), Romani musician in France in 1874 painted by Camille Corot (right)

Romani music is the music of the Romani people. In the English language, Romani people have long been known by the exonym Gypsies or Gipsies and this remains the most common English term for the group. Some Romani use and embrace this term while others consider it to be derogatory or an ethnic slur.

Historically nomadic, though now largely settled, the Romani people have long acted as entertainers and tradesmen in Europe. In many of the places Romani live they have become known as musicians. The wide distances travelled have introduced elements from Indian, Greek (Byzantine), Persian, Armenian, Turkish, Balkan, German and French music.

It is difficult to define the parameters of a unified Romani musical style, as there are differences in melodic, harmonic, rhythmic and formal structures from region to region. Lyrics to Romani songs may incorporate one or more dialects of the Romani language, and dance frequently accompanies Romani music performance.

The Spanish flamenco is to a very large extent the music (and dance, or indeed the culture) of the Romani people of Andalusia.

Romani people are descendants of skilled Indian musicians and dancers who were sent to Iran. Sekandar Amān Allāhi references many historical records that detail the movement of Romani groups through Iran during the Sasanian Empire era. He also cited a famous excerpt from Ferdowsi’s Shahnameh, where the Sasanian king Bahram V requested the Indian king to send 10,000 luri men and women who were expert lute players to Iran.

The Romani community has significantly influenced flamenco, jazz manouche, Russian ‘romances’, Balkan music, Hungarian czardas, and various fusions with jazz, hip-hop, Western art music, and various folk genres across Europe.

== Romani folk music ==
Romani folk music, a style based solely on Romani musical traditions and not on the traditions of the country in which they reside, is relatively rare. It is mainly vocal and consists of slow plaintive songs and fast melodies which may be accompanied by dancing. The fast melodies are accompanied with tongue-clacking, hand-clapping, mouth-basses, clicking of wooden spoons and other techniques. Romani folk music in the Balkans typically incorporates, or is sung entirely in, the Romani language. In some other countries however, knowledge and use of the language has diminished significantly over the centuries, with many Romani people not speaking any Romanes.

There are five main components found in Romani folk music. The first is the use of three voices or parts: the melodic line, the terce and the quint, either through vocalization or instruments. The second is syncopation, where the music starts right after a beat while maintaining a consistent rhythm. The third is having the music played in different phrases, meaning that the entrance and exit of different musical themes are felt at different times throughout a song either through rhythm or instruments. The fourth is harmony, where a minor key center is often used instead of a major one. The last is singing, where natural vocal abilities are emphasized.

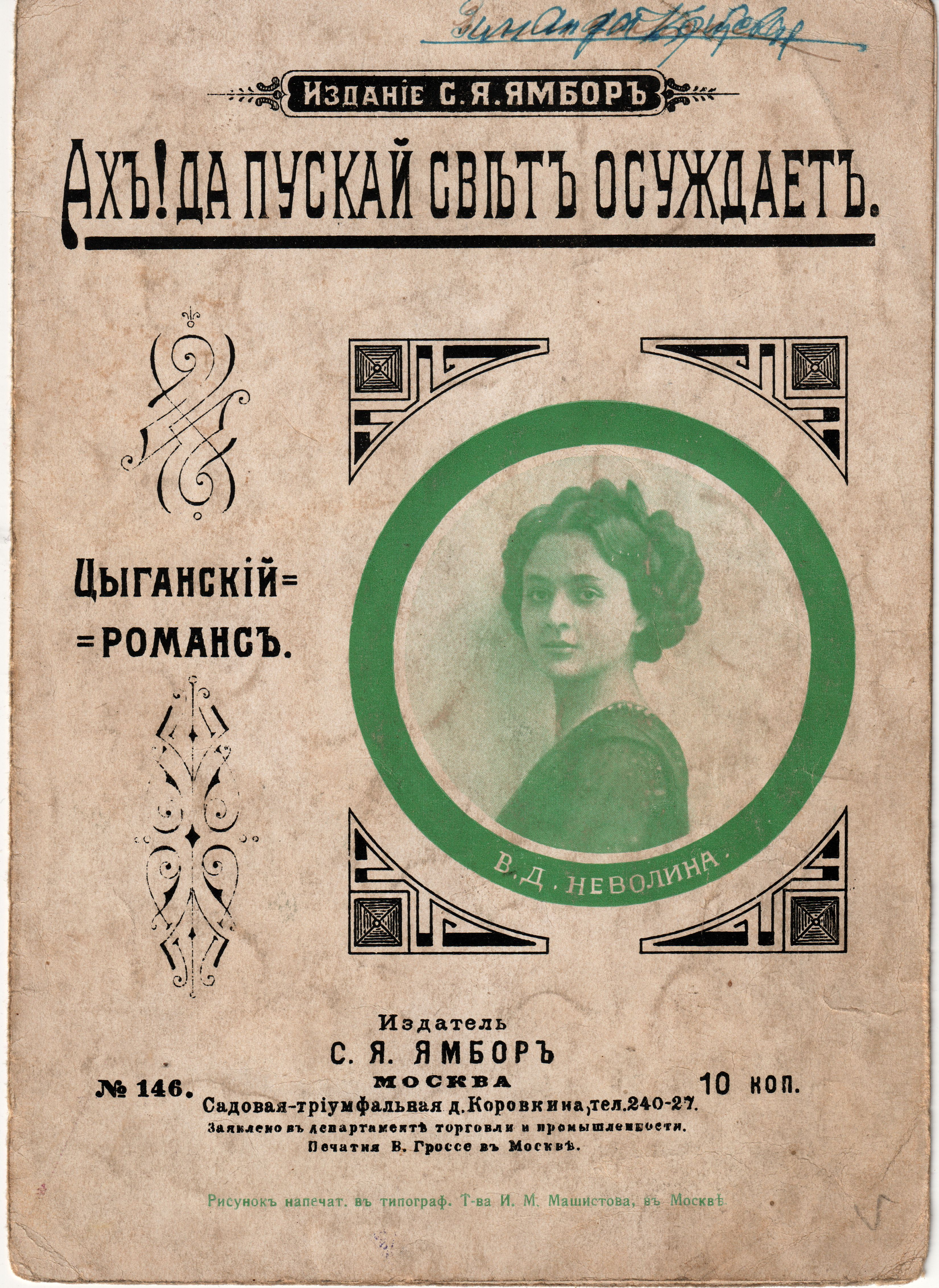
Sheet music - "Ah, Let the World Judge" -- Russian "Gypsy romance"

== Country-related music ==
Most Romani music is built upon certain folk music traditions of the countries where they have migrated through or settled. Local music is adopted and performed – usually instrumental – and, slowly, it is transformed into Romani styles, which are usually more complex than the original styles. In its turn, Romani music has greatly influenced the local music.

This regional aspect of Romani music is vividly expressed in the documentary Latcho Drom, which follows Romani music from Northern India through Egypt, Turkey, Romania, Hungary, Slovakia, and France, ending in Spain.

=== Balkans ===
Popular styles of Romani music within the Balkans include Tallava and Manele. Tallava was formed by the Romani minority in Kosovo in the 1990s. The genre of Tallava was later adopted among the Ashkali group. Tallava is common in Albania. Romanian manele emerged as a post-communist ethno-pop genre, drawing on Romanian lăutărească traditions as well as South Slavic, Turkish, Middle Eastern and Western popular music. It developed alongside related post-socialist genres such as Serbian turbo-folk and Bulgarian chalga, with extensive cross-border musical exchange between them.

==== Bulgaria ====
Due to the significant Romani population in Bulgaria, this ethnic group's music is very popular in the country. Chalgamata music is also played by Romani musicians in Bulgaria.

==== Hungary ====
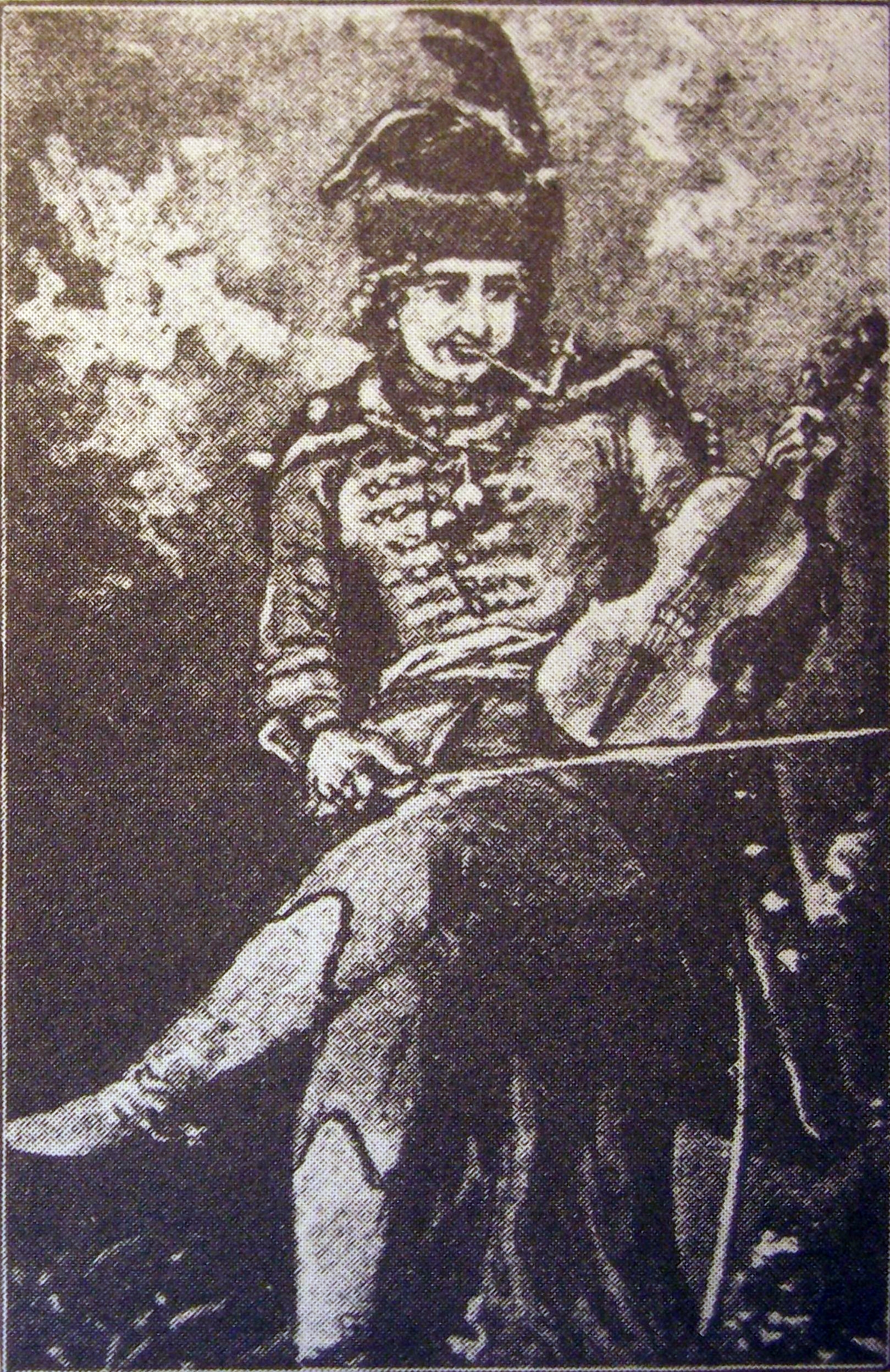
Panna Cinka

The Rajkó Orchestra and Folk Ensemble is known for preserving Romani music, dance and costume culture in Hungary since 1952. Their work carries on the traditions of century-old generations. Their performances can be seen at a number of venues, among others at the Danube Palace of Budapest during the season between 1 May and 31 October.

Traditionally there are two types of Romani music: one rendered for non-Romani audiences (sung in Hungarian), and the other, rendered for Romani audiences (typically sung in Romani). The music performed for outsiders is known as "Gypsy music". They call the music they play among themselves "folk music".

In the early 19th century, Romani musicians came to the forefront of national music. During the Hungarian Revolution of 1848 in Hungary, Romani bands played their music for soldiers before and after the battle to encourage and entertain them. After the loss of the war, these musicians gained a lot of respect from the country. Romani music became a symbol of desired freedom.

==== Romania ====
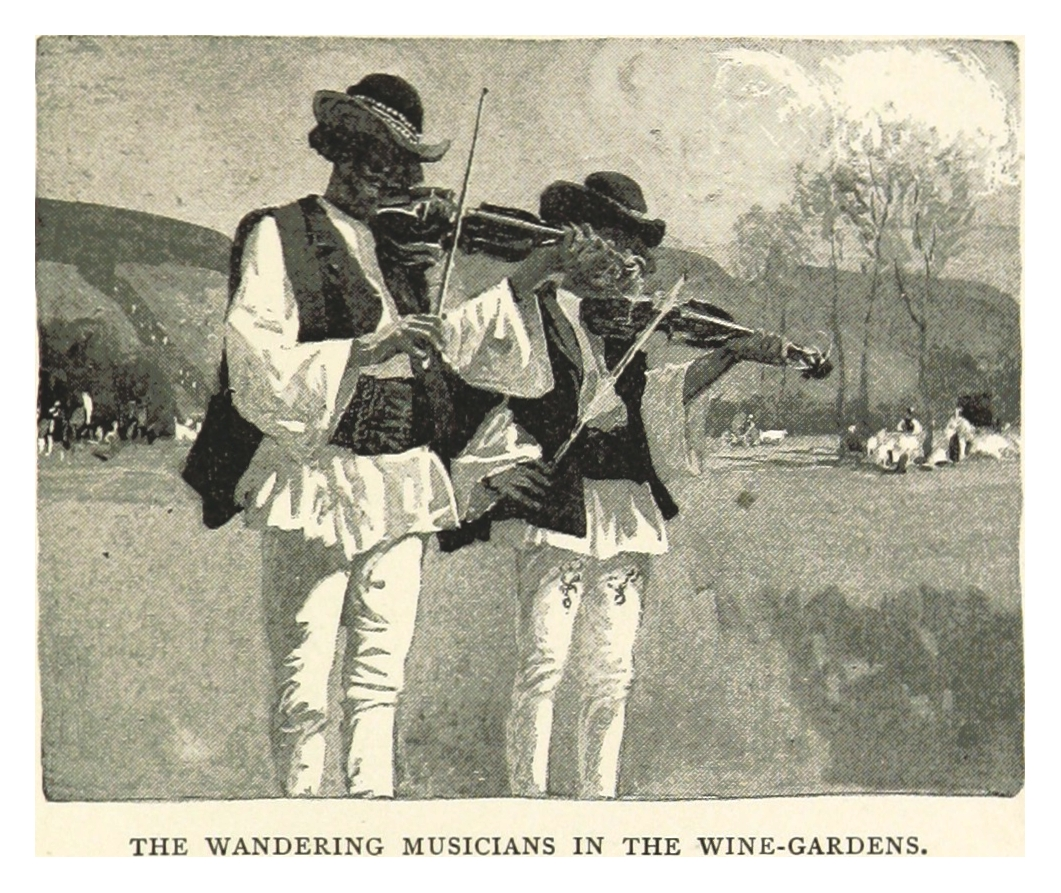
Wandering musicians in the wine gardens of Transylvania (Pennell, 1893)

The Lăutari were traditional Romani musicians, playing at various events (weddings, funerals, etc.)

The manele genre Romania is performed by Romanian musicians and Romani musicians. It is thought to have developed amongst Romani people who migrated from East Thrace, carrying oriental influences. It is generally thought of as lower class due to being associated with the Roma.

==== Serbia ====
Romani musical styles spread through Serbia during the Ottoman period.

==== Turkey (East Thrace) ====
Roma in Turkey, concentrated in European Turkey, are known for their musicianship. Their urban music brought echoes of classical Turkish music to the public via the meyhane or taverna. This type of fasıl music (a style, not to be confused with the fasıl form of classical Turkish music) coupled with food and alcoholic beverages is often associated with the underclass of Turkish society, though it also can be found in more "respectable" establishments in modern times.

Romani have also influenced the fasıl itself. Played in music halls, the dance music (oyun havası) required at the end of each fasıl has been incorporated with Ottoman rakkas or belly dancing motifs. The rhythmic ostinato accompanying the instrumental improvisation (ritimli taksim) for the belly-dance parallels that of the classical gazel, a vocal improvisation in free rhythm with rhythmic accompaniment. Popular musical instruments in this kind of fasıl are the clarinet, violin, kanun and darbuka. Clarinetist Mustafa Kandıralı is a well known fasıl musician.

=== France ===
Gypsy jazz is popular in France, and was primarily innovated by Romani jazz guitarist and composer Django Reinhardt.

=== Spain ===
The Calé Romani people in Spain have contributed significantly to the Andalusian musical tradition known as flamenco. The genre is often associated with Romani people as it developed amongst the Romani minority, although it is based upon folkloric music traditions of southern Spain. A number of famous flamenco artists are Romani.

=== Russia ===
A choir in Russia was the Sokolovsky choir.

In 1931, a public Romani theatre, Romen Theatre, has been established in Moscow incorporating Romani music and dance into theatrical performances.

== See also ==
- Orchestra of the Hundred Gypsy Musicians
- Flamenco
- Romani jazz
- Romani punk
- Prímás
- Lăutari
- Romani anthem
- Romani society and culture
- Pretty Loud
- Romani hip hop
- Latcho Drom
- Hacha'a

== Bibliography ==
- Broughton, Simon, "Kings and Queens of the Road". 2000. In Broughton, Simon and Ellingham, Mark with McConnachie, James and Duane, Orla (Ed.), World Music, Vol. 1: Africa, Europe and the Middle East, pp 146–158. Rough Guides Ltd, Penguin Books. ISBN 1-85828-636-0
- Balint Sarosi, "Zigeunermusik" (Gypsy music), Budapest 1970, in English, German, Hungarian
- Samson, Jim (2013). Music in the Balkans. BRILL. pp. 77–79. ISBN 978-90-04-25038-3.
