= Pretty Loud =

Serbian Romani rap group

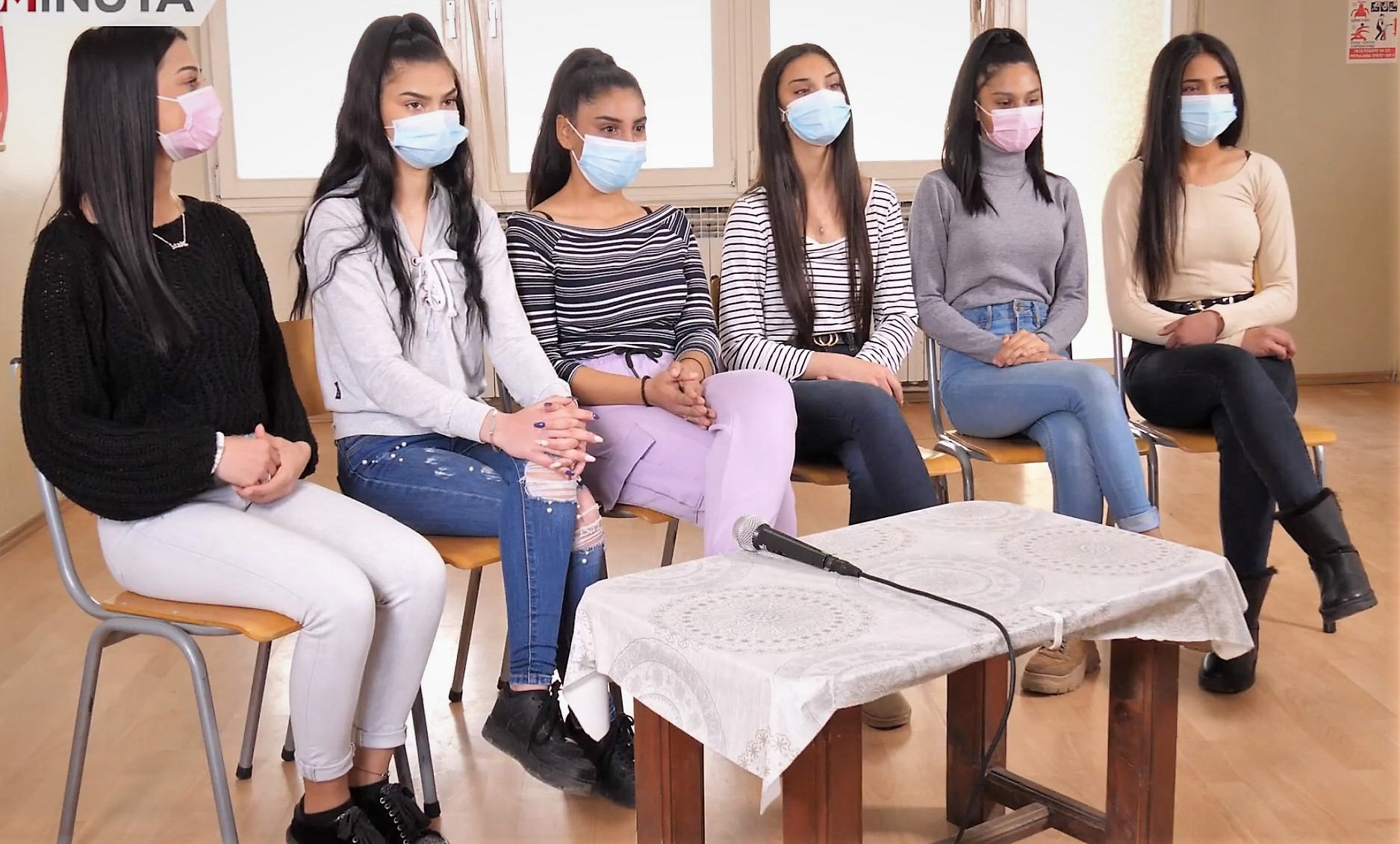
"Pretty Loud" interviewed by Južne Vesti Serbian news in 2021

Pretty Loud is a Roma rap group based in Zemun, Serbia, advocating for women's empowerment in the Romani community. The group formed in 2014, when the all-female members started singing together as part of the NGO educational and social program GRUBB (Gypsy Roma Urban Balkan Beats). GRUBB's goal is to help young Roma take their futures into their own hands, to stay in school and get an education. According to one of Pretty Loud's members, "We want to stop the early marriages [...] we want the girls themselves, and not their parents, to decide whether they want to marry or not. We want every woman to have the right to be heard, to have her dreams and to be able to fulfil them, to be equal". The group's music blends traditional Romani music with contemporary rap and they sing in Romani, Serbian and English.

The group has previously collaborated with the London College of Fashion, and in 2020 they participated in the Women of the World Festival in London. During this festival they performed in the Royal Festival Hall. Members of the group teach music and dance workshops held by GRUBB.

== History ==
The group was started in 2014 in the Serbian capital, Belgrade, as part of the GRUBB organisation and the members involved used the band in school appearances to spread their positive message, along with holding workshops for children to teach them dance, music, and acting. The idea for the band arose at artistic workshops held by GRUBB, where Pretty Loud members were part of the GRUBB Show and decided to start their own all-girl group. Two of the first members were Zlata Ristic and Silvia Sinani, who encouraged the group toward using rap and hip hop as the best way to openly discuss the issues in their communities and to help fight discrimination and improve education levels within the Roma community. Band member Silvia Sinani recalled the band's name arose from the notion that Roma women are not typically very loud.

The members of Pretty Loud include a 19-year-old law student, a young single mother, schoolgirls and young professionals, all who live in challenging environments within Roma settlements.

== Awards and recognition ==
In 2021 they won the "Bring the Noize" award from the BeFem feminist cultural center in Belgrade for advancing struggle of Roma women. In their interview for Croatian portal VoxFemiae, they stated that although they were recognised in their community and had street credibility, they still experience discrimination. In an interview for Kosovo 2.0 they mention that learning English is important for them to expand their performance options internationally. For the Turkish national news agency that called them the first Roma female band, they stated that they were hopeful that others would follow up on their work and that they would make it easier for next bands to develop.
