= Nadine El Roubi =

Sudanese rapper

- Born: Khartoum
- Citizenship: Sudan
- Occupation: Sudanese Rapper
- Known for: Neo-soul and hip-hop

Nadine El Roubi is a Sudanese rapper whose music has been characterized as neo-soul and hip-hop.

== Early life and education ==
El Roubi was born in Khartoum to an Egyptian Sudanese mother and Iranian Sudanese father. At age 1, her family moved to Fairfax, Virginia, where she lived until age 10, returning back to Sudan. She attended college in Maastricht and graduate school for creative writing in Birmingham.

Her childhood musical influences were pop icons Celine Dion and Nancy Ajram from her mother, and The Sugarhill Gang, Eminem, and Fugees from her father, who was a DJ. She played piano as a child.

== Career ==
El Roubi worked in film production and marketing before pursuing a career in music. She released freestyles and singles before the release of her 2022 debut EP Triplicity, working with Shlonak Records and Empire Distribution.

The 2024 album Freestyles, Pt. 2: A Mixtape! is a sequel to a previously released 10 minute track, Freestyles, Pt. 1. She collaborated with Felukah for the Wavy in Brooklyn single and music video, produced by Mo Stank.

=== Advocacy ===
El Roubi performed at a Princeton University tribute concert for Sudan and raised funds for the Sudanese American Physicians Association. She headlined the 2024 fundraiser 'Nile Nights' in New York City.

== Personal life ==
El Roubi has expressed interest in astrology and identifies as a Virgo. She has younger sisters.

In 2023, El Roubi's family fled Sudan to Egypt after their home was destroyed in the Battle of Khartoum.
