= Tick (pejorative) =

Tick (German: Zecke) is a common term used in Germany's right-wing extremist environment to degrade and insult those who think differently, especially leftists and Punks. It has been used since at least 1992 by neo-Nazi skinhead groups, first often as "left-wing tick" (German: linke Zecke), which became commonly shortened to simply "tick" by 1998.

According to today's right-wing extremist ideology so-called ticks are seen as the main concept of the enemy and are regarded as "un-Germans ideologically and culturally". The degradation of humans to ticks, i.e. parasites, ties in with the animal metaphors used in the language of Nazi Germany. The terms "pests" and "Jewish parasites" were widespread in National Socialism. Today these pest metaphors are also widely used in right-wing extremist music and can also be seen as indirect incitement for killing. Violence committed by right-wing extremists was often described as "tick slapping".

In the punk or rapscene the term is used as an antonym and sometimes as a self-designation. The punk bands "Se Sichelzecken" and "ESA-Zecken" made the swearword part of their names.

In recent years the term tick has been made popular and has been used as a self-designation in the musical genre of tick rap. Some followers of the football club FC St. Pauli, especially in the ultra scene, also say "Wir sind Zecken" (we are ticks) in fan chants.

In the aftermath of the Sea-Watch 3 affair and its intrusion into the port of Lampedusa the Italian Minister of the Interior, Matteo Salvini, insulted the German captain Carola Rackete as a "German tick" at a party celebration of the Lega in Barzago in July 2019.
