= Double Pact =

- Origin: Lausanne and Geneva, Switzerland
- Genres: Swiss hip hop Hip hop
- Years active: 1994–2006
- Labels: Arsenal Records, TBA, Delabel
- Members: Stress (Andres Andrekson); Nega (Sérge Djoungong); Yvan (Yvan Jacquemet)

Double Pact are a Swiss rap group from Lausanne, Switzerland. They rap in French, and have collaborated extensively with French and German rappers/hip hop artists. Andres Andrekson, better known by his stage name Stress, was born in 1977 in Estonia, and moved to Lausanne, Switzerland at the age of twelve. He was member of Double Pact, and started his solo career in 2003 with Billy Bear. Since then, his music enjoys great success in Switzerland, with all four solo albums reaching the Top 20.Serge Djoungong known by his stage name Negatif (Nega till 2009) is born in Geneva, but with origins from Cameroon. Nega released his 4th album “Atlanta&Roestigraben” on 2012 and plan a new album for 2018. Yvan continued as a producer, like with Booba's Mauvais Garçon, Kenza Farah's Désillusion Du Ghetto and Sinik's Ne Dis Jamais among others. He also contributed on Beginner's single Gustav Gans with a remix.

== Discography ==
- 1995 Impact N°3 (EP) (Night & Day)
- 1997 P.a.c.t. / Safe Sex Fana / Live Du Labo (12") (Condor Records)
- 1998 Pour Ma Planète Bleue (TBA)
- 1998 Untitled EP (Label 60)
- 1999 ...C'Est Comme La Vie (TBA)
- 1999 Dog Danse / Qu'Une Vie (12") (TBA)
- 1999 One Love (Heute Ist Ein Guter Tag) (CD, Maxi) (TBA)
- 2001 Kidnapping (EP) ('Kopfnicker Records')
- 2001 Outsidaz / Grenzen? (12") ('Kopfnicker Records') with Spax, Tefla & Jaleel and Less Du Neuf
- 2001 Psychisch Frank / Kidnapping (Snippet Tape) ('Kopfnicker Records') with Karibik Frank
- 2002 Rien à Perdre (TBA/Delabel)
- 2006 Au Revoir (Best of) (TBA)
