= Mustafa Kandıralı =

Turkish musician (1930–2020)

Originally named Mustafa Kadıoğlu (born 1930, Kandıra, Kocaeli, Turkey- 27 December 2020, Tuzla, Istanbul), he was a Turkish clarinetist of classical Turkish art music, Turkish folk music and gypsy music. He was a world renowned virtuoso and played in many international jazz festivals.
