= Arnar Freyr Frostason =

- Born: 29 February 1988
- Genres: Hip hop
- Occupation(s): Rapper, songwriter
- Years active: 2009–present

Arnar Freyr Frostason (born 29 February 1988), also known as Arnar Úlfur, is an Icelandic rapper. He is best known as a member of the hip hop duo Úlfur Úlfur.

In 2009, he won the Icelandic Músíktilraunir with the band Bróðir Svartúlfur, which included Helgi Sæmundur Guðmundsson. The following year he formed the duo Úlfur Úlfur with Helgi Sæmundur. In 2018, he published the solo album Hasarlífsstíll.

== Personal life ==
In 2019, Arnar Freyr married Icelandic singer and actress Salka Sól Eyfeld. Together they have two children.
