= AmabAdamA =

Icelandic reggae band

Amaba Dama stylized as AmabAdamA is an Icelandic reggae band. The band formed in 2013 is signed to the Record Records label in Iceland. AmabAdamA has released its album Heyrðu mig nú with both the album and the single "Hossa Hossa" charted in the Icelandic Singles Chart in 2014 and "GAIA" in 2015. Other notable releases include the singles "Yo la la" and "Aftansöngur". The front singers in the band are: Gnúsi Yones, Salka Sól Eyfeld and Steinunn Jónsdóttir.

== Discography ==
=== Albums ===
- 2014: Heyrðu mig nú

=== Singles ===
- 2011: "Yo la la"
- 2012: "Aftansöngur"
- 2014: "Hossa Hossa"
- 2015: "Hermenn"
