= Hjálmar Hjálmarsson =

Icelandic actor and voice actor (born 1963)

Hjálmar Hjálmarsson (born 28 August 1963) is an Icelandic actor and voice actor.

== Career ==
Hjálmar graduated from the Icelandic Drama School in 1987. He has been involved in numerous productions on stage at the National Theatre of Iceland and Reykjavík City Theatre. He has also been involved in directing and writing several radio and television productions.

He was nominated for an Edda Award in 2003 for his script of Áramótaskaupið 2002.

Hjálmar has dubbed a lot of cartoons into icelandic, he is among others the Icelandic voice of Po in the Kung Fu Panda movies, Rex in the Toy Story movies, Piglet in Winnie the Pooh and Shrek. Hjálmar has also directed the icelandic dubbings of some animated movies such as Rio, Turbo and Trolls.

== Personal life ==
Hjálmar is married to Guðbjörg Ólafsdóttir, a teacher. They have three children: Salka Sól, Hjálmar Óli, and Adrien Brody (not to be confused with the actor of the same name).

== Selected filmography ==
- Pocahontas (1995) as Wiggins
- One Hundred and One Dalmatians (1995) as Jasper
- The Swan Princess (1996) as Jean-Bob
- The Hunchback of Notre Dame (1996) as Hugo
- Prince of Egypt (1998) as Rameses II
- Harry Potter and the Sorcerer's Stone (2001) as Professor Quirrell
- The Jungle Book 2 (2003) as Lucky
- Finding Nemo (2003) as Marlin
- Garfield (2004) as Garfield
- Meet the Robinsons (2007) as Uncle Art
- Up (2009) as Campmaster
- Wreck-It Ralph (2012) as Ralph
- Inside Out (2015) as Bing Bong
- Finding Dory (2016) as Marlin
- The Lion King (2019) as Azizi
- Shrek franchise as Shrek
- Toy Story franchise as Rex
- Madagascar franchise as Kowalski
- Cars franchise as Ramone
- Kung Fu Panda franchise as Po
