= Zeckenrap =

Zeckenrap (named after the pejorative Zecke) is a subgenre of German hip-hop dealing with political left themes such as antifascism, feminism and queer content.

== History ==
In the beginnings in the 1980s, as in American hip-hop, political character was the main focus in West German hip-hop, dealing with themes such as racism and everyday problems. With the commercialization of German hip-hop music in the 1990s these political themes lyrically became more and more a background aspect, even though groups such as Advanced Chemistry or Anarchist Academy still wrote songs about political themes. In the 2000s, the network HipHop Partizan was responsible for the establish of rap music within the left scene in Germany. Beginning in 2012, the rap collective Tick-Tick Boom contributed in spreading of the term Zeckenrap. Between 2012 and 2015, the collective regularly hosted a Zeckenrapgala.

The German hip-hop group Neonschwarz from Hamburg is said to be the inventor of the term Zeckenrap. The group was also part of the Tick-Tick Boom collective and stated that they invented the word to "oppose something positive to the negative cliché in describing the left as Zecke". Even though some Zeckenrap artists were able to get some recognition, Zeckenrap is still considered a marginal phenomenon within the German rap music scene, playing a minor role.

== Views by state authorities ==
In a study on behalf of the Forschungs- und Beratungsstelle Terrorismus/Extremismus, a part of the Bundeskriminalamt, the Zeckenrap as well as Rechtsrock and the militant-salafist Naschid music were investigated. The study concluded that some lyrics of Zeckenrap artists use a "emotionalizing, partly dehumanizing enemy image with an explicit call of violence", especially against right-wing extremists, the police and the state.

The Annual Report on the Protection of the Constitution of 2012 in Berlin, an incident was mentioned where a group of around 50 people attacked a police car in Berlin-Kreuzberg and tried to win over 150 attendees of a Zeckenrapgala.

== Known artists ==
- Captain Gips
- Disastar
- Kobito
- Kurzer Prozess
- Johhny Mauser
- Lena Stoehrfaktor
- Neonschwarz
- Phillie MC
- Pöbel MC
- Pyro One
- Refpolk
- Schlagzeiln
- Sir Mantis
- Sookee
- Swiss
- Teuterekordz
- Waving the Guns
