= Lebanese hip-hop =

Music genre

Lebanese Hip Hop is a pioneering movement in Arabic hip hop as Lebanese youth were among the first to be affected by hip hop culture. Arabic hip hop has received Western media attention, but most Lebanese rappers think that there is still a lack of local interest in their music. Hip hop in Lebanon is both an art form and a stage for artists to voice their alternative discourse in the public sphere.

In 2001, Erhab records label introduced gangster rap to the Lebanese hiphop scene. The label established a recording studio in 2008 in Lebanon's central prison Roumieh Prison, They released many singles and albums featuring inmates.

== Roots and significance ==
Scholars attribute the genre of rap to African origins, rooted in West African oral traditions and community story-tellers such as Griots. However, contemporary Hip-hop culture emerged in the late 1970s in New York City. As the genre grew in popularity, the globalisation of rap exported the genre to other regions, where local styles and cultures shaped the genre to represent their milieu. This is a term known as "glocalization" and was coined by French sociologist Roland Robertson in 1994 to refer the localization of globalised products and phenomenas.

Lebanese rap began to gain traction as a result of the 2011 Arab revolutions, where rap became a tool of mobilization and opposition in the face of injustice. The revolutions and the role of rap and hip-hop in the region changed the social perception as a genre from one that is exported by the West to a localised version that provided a voice for those marginalised.

El Rass in an interview in 2015 when asked what the recurring themes are in Arabic Rap:" On est arrivé à ce stade où les spécificités deviennent vraiment caractéristiques, c’est là que l’on est passé du rap en arabe au rap arabe.” (Translated: We've reached the point where these specific traits have really become defining characteristics; that's when we made the shift from rap in Arabic to Arabic rap.)

Atabah (Arabic: عتابة) is a form of improvised Arabic poetry that uses the lyrical nature of the Arabic language in its performance.

== Popular artists ==
- El Rass
- Hamorabi
- Ashekman
- Rayess Bek
- Aks’ser
- Fareeq el Atrash
- Jaafar Touffar
- Bu Nasser Touffar
- HADI
- Nuj
- Sabine Salameh

== See also ==
- Arabic hip hop
