= Vigilante rap =

Music genre

- Etymology: Derived from the concept of "vigilantism," often associated with self-policing and taking justice into one's own hands.
- Stylistic origins: Hip hop, gangsta rap, political rap
- Cultural origins: United States, late 2010s to early 2020s
- Typical instruments: Vocals, drum machine, sampler
- Derivative forms: Drill, gangsta rap, political rap

Regional scenes
- Primarily Brazilian cities such as Rio De Janeiro

Other topics
- Crime, justice, political unrest

Vigilante rap, also known as V-rap or rap das milícias, is a genre of hip-hop developed in Brazil and whose lyrics, as opposed to gangsta rap, are about praising vigilantism and violent acts against criminals instead of criminal enterprise or gangster life.

In the milícias' turfs, in Rio de Janeiro, V-rap is prevalent since any endorsement of criminal enterprise is highly and violently discouraged and, thus, regular gangsta rap or proibidão (a kind of crude gangsta rap which emerged from the Brazilian slums) is not allowed to be played at parties or even in a citizen's house.

== Overview ==
The v-rap songs often contain violent lyrics that deal with equally violent means of dispatching criminals, foul language and war chants from the milícias themselves. The musical style closely resembles that of funk carioca.

The style is mainly underground and yet not well documented by the media, but is viewed as an answer to the increased boldness of the favelas drugs lords who, from the beginning of the 2000s are playing even more anti-police gangsta rap as a provocation to the rival milicianos (a miliciano is a member of a milícia or an armed band of vigilantes).

Not infrequently, after the so-called bailes funks (favela gangsta rap parties), both drugs lords and milicianos face off in violent clashes where they exchange gunfire, often ending in death.
