= Romani hip-hop =

Musical genre from Eastern Europe

Romani hip hop is a musical genre from Eastern Europe, formed through a fusion of hip hop with Romani melodies and lyrics.

Artists include Kmetoband and Gipsy.cz. The Turkish Romani hip hop group Tahribad-ı İsyan was founded in Istanbul's Sulukule neighbourhood, a historically Roma area.

== See also ==
- Romani music
- Romani people
