= Gambian hip-hop =

Music genre or scene

The Gambian hip hop scene is a relatively new scene in African hip hop which developed in the mid-1990s and was heavily influenced by American hip hop and Senegalese hip hop. Gambian hip-hop has been heavily influenced by international music scene including worldbeat, Senegalese wolof music, and American hip hop, as well as traditional Gambian mbalax and n'daga music. Dominican merengue and Jamaican reggae, ragga, and dancehall have also influenced the development of Gambian hip-hop.

== History ==
=== Griot ===
Like many other West African countries, the Gambia has a history of griot storytelling going back eight centuries. Griot is widely considered to be a precursor to rapping, and was a kind of rhythmic, rhyming storytelling accompanied by drums and sparse instrumentation.

=== Origins of modern hip-hop ===
The modern hip-hop scene in the Gambia started in the late 1990s after the Gambia opened its National Television, Gambia Radio & Television Services (GRTS) in 1995. The first Gambian rap group was Black Nature, founded in 1995. Other early groups were "Dancehall Masters", "Masla Bi", "Da Fugitivz", "Born Africans" and many others. These groups were among the most popular and most successful irap groups in Gambia at the time. They were also notable for mixing hip-hop with reggae, mbalax, salsa, dancehall and other genres of music which led to the development of a distinct sound. Rappers like Poetic X and Papper House Crew held onto a more traditional sound, with a heavy emphasis on lyricism. These early groups have left a lasting impression on the hip-hop industry in the Gambia today, and some groups such as Da Fugitivz are still active in the industry.

The first award ceremony to promote and celebrate Gambian hip-hop artists was the Rap Award '99 ceremony held at Kairaba Beach Hotel on 31 July 1999. The awards ceremony was organized by Gambian music promoter Harona Drammeh, who was a staff member of GRTS at the time. Now there are various award ceremonies held to promote Gambian artists in the music industry. In 2007, Black Lynx and One Tribe Sound, the best known hip hop movements and promoters in the country, joined forces as the Afric Alliance, and came up with the open mic show where rappers were invited to perform.

=== International success ===
Many of these early Gambian artists had breakthroughs in the international scene during the 1990s, and the success of Gambian hip-hop internationally is attributable to the global appeal of hip-hop. In August 1999 after releasing their first album, Gambian rap group Da Fugitivz were invited to the Pop Com Musical Festival in Germany, and were subsequently featured on an "Africa Raps" compilation for the German record label Trikon in 1999. The group toured internationally, playing in Europe and the United States, and received national and international awards. International artists of Gambian-origin such as Atlanta-based rapper Salma Slims have achieved mainstream success in markets such as the United States.

=== Popularity and evolution ===
Gambia's hip-hop industry continued to grow throughout the 21st Century, popularized by new rappers such as Freaky Joe (now better known as Singhateh), and Sing-Jay Rebellion. In the early 1990s, the Gambian hip hop scene was dominated by male rappers based in the Gambia, although now both female rappers and Gambian rappers settled abroad are getting into the scene. Nancy Nanz a.k.a. Gambian Beyonce, is one of a few women to make a breakthrough in the Gambian hip-hop industry and become well known in the Gambia. Other emerging female Gambian rap artists include Debbie Romero, a Nigerian who was raised in Gambia.

== Cultural impact and reception ==
Reggae and hip-hop music are the most popular genres in the Gambia, and have broad appeal in the ghettos of Gambia. Hip hop fashion, including baggy pants, sneakers, and baseball caps, has become very popular among male youths in Gambia although the popularity of hip hop is not as politicized as it is in many countries. The media, especially the Gambia Radio and Television Services, actively promotes artists in the hip-hop scene. Apart from the normal broadcasts, Saturday nights are usually dedicated to showcasing the music scene of the Gambia and a show called Extra Touch was the first of its kind on GRTS to invite rappers to perform live in their studios.

=== Politics in Gambian hip-hop ===
Many individual Gambian rappers use music to express controversial political and social ideas. The hip-hop community was repressed during the presidency of Yahya Jammeh, but had a resurgence after his exit from office when political topics were once again able to be explored in mainstream entertainment. Hip-hop artists and political activists Retsam and Ali Cham (known by the stagename Killa Ace) protested the presidency of Yahya Jammeh, during whose tenure they were forced to leave the country due to threats of arrest or violence. Cham fled the country and entered Senegal with his family and management after they were allegedly targeted with death threats by the Gambian government. Cham returned to Gambia, where he continued to protest police brutality and corruption, after President Adama Barrow took office in 2017. Cham was subsequently arrested and charged with assault after an alleged run-in with law enforcement. Cham's controversial trial prompted criticism of Gambia's law enforcement, and renewed concerns of police brutality and corruption.
