= Nazar (rapper) =

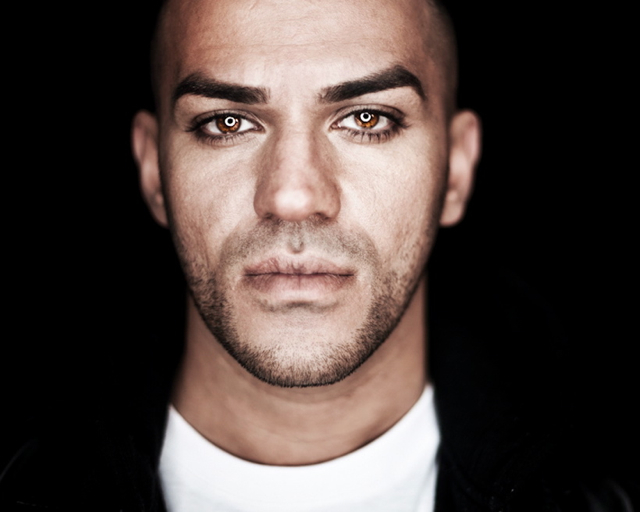
- Nazar in 2012

Background information
- Birth name: Ardalan Afshar
- Born: 20 September 1984 (age 41) Tehran, Iran
- Genres: Hip hop
- Occupations: Rapper; Singer; Songwriter; Record Producer
- Years active: 2006–present
- Labels: Assphalt Muzik
- Website: www.nazar10.net

Ardalan Afshar (Persian: اردلان افشار; born 20 September 1984 in Tehran), better known by his stage name Nazar, is an Iranian and Austrian rapper and singer.

== Biography ==
Nazar grew up in Vienna, Austria to Iranian parents. His father had died as a soldier in the Iran-Iraq War, whereupon his mother fled to Austria with him and his brother. Nazar spent his youth in Vienna's district of Favoriten, where at this time he often clashed with neo-Nazis. In 2006 Nazar began his career as a rapper. At a gig near Stuttgart, he was discovered by the record label Assphalt Muzik. In 2007, Nazar published several songs on the Internet, which spread quickly even outside the country.

In June 2008 the charges of robbery against him were dropped. Nazar's lawyer said his client had in the commotion "just" pulled a gun and threatened to beat the opponent.

On 12 March 2010 Nazar published the album Artkore with RAF Camora.

Since 6 May 2011 Nazar has been seen in the documentary Schwarzkopf by Arman T. Riahi. On 13 May he released his album Fakker, which was co-produced again by RAF Camora.

== Discography ==
=== Albums ===
Year	Album	Peak positions			Certification
Year	Album	AUT	GER	SWI	Certification
2008	Kinder des Himmels	–	–	–	
2009	Paradox	–	–	–	
2010	Artkore (Joint album with RAF Camora)	31	–	–	
2011	Fakker	6	36	–	
2012	Narkose	5	10	28	
2013	Fakker Lifestyle	2	3	15	
2014	Camouflage	1	2	5	
2016	Irreversibel	1	7	22	
2018	Mosaik	2	15	38	
2018	DNA	10	–	–	

=== Singles ===
Year	Song	Peak positions	Album
Year	Song	AUT	Album
2009	"Össi Ö" (feat. RAF Camora and Chakuza)	–	Paradox
2011	"Kein morgen" (feat. Sido and RAF 3.0)	–	
2014	"Freundlicher Diktator"	67	Camouflage
2014	"Zwischen Zeit und Raum" (feat. Falco)	14	Camouflage
2016	"La Haine Kidz"	–	Irreversibel
2016	"Hood Life Crew"	–	Irreversibel
2016	"Generation Darth Vader"	–	
2020	"No Go"	71	

Featured in

Year	Album	Peak positions		Certification
Year	Album	AUT	GER	Certification
2012	"Fallen (RAF 3.0 feat Nazar)	57	96	

Juice-Exclusives

- 2010: "Fakkergeddon" (feat. RAF Camora) (Juice Exclusive!)
- 2011: "Glaubs mir" (feat. RAF 3.0) (Juice Exclusive!)

Freetracks

- 2009: "Flammen über Wien Pt. 2" (feat. RAF Camora)
- 2010: "Meine Stadt" (feat. Chakuza, Kamp and RAF Camora)
- 2010: "Sagol" (feat. RAF Camora & Playboy 51)

=== Videography ===
- "Sandsturm" (12 August 2012)
- "Lost in Translation" (27 July 2012)
- "Narkose" (25 August 2012)
- "Danke für alles" (feat. O.Z & Dj Paul Blaze) (17 September 2012)
- "Intro" (16 June 2013)
- "Abrakadabra" (5 July 2013)
- "An Manchen Tagen" (19 July 2013)
- "Intro" (16 June 2014)
- "Rapbeef" (27 June 2014)
- "Borderliner" (11 July 2014)
- "Freundlicher Diktator" (28 August 2014)
- "Zwischen Zeit & Raum" (15 August 2014)

== Filmografie ==
- 2011: Schwarzkopf - A film about identity, longing and a new generation of Viennese by director Arman T. Riahi.
