= Songo-salsa =

Music genre

Songo-salsa is a style of music that blends Spanish rapping and hip hop beats with salsa music and songo. Well-known exponents include Bamboleo and Charanga Habanera.
