= Austrian hip-hop =

Hip-hop music from Austria

Austrian hip hop is not a genre of hip hop music, but rather a geographic classification. The majority of Austrian hip hop acts perform underground hip hop, inasmuch as the large radio stations in the country have no airtime slated for native hip hop. The only radio station that does is FM4, which boasts an electric format.

== History and acts ==
Falco is often seen as the first successful Austrian rapper, but in fact Falco didn't want to be seen as rapper, but as a pop/rock musician. Nevertheless, the first songs from Austria to be known of featuring rap verses were sung by Falco.

The first "official" Austrian hip hop album to be released was Sound Vibes by The Moreaus in 1990. Then again, The Moreaus were not very defining for hip hop in Austria. The most well-known acts in the 1990s were Schönheitsfehler, Fünfhaus Posse and Texta. From the beginning, the hip hop culture in Austria was being dominated by East Austrian acts. There have been only a few acts from the west of Austria who got wider attention.

In 2000, Schönheitsfehler had their first commercial success. Their album SexDrugsAndHipHop reached rank 20 of the Austrian Longplay Charts, with the single Fuck You charting in Germany.

With the rise of Gangsta rap in Germany in the middle of the 2000s, more and more Gangsta rappers in Austria appeared. Most notable are Chakuza, Nazar and RAF Camora who also had commercial success. Chakuza and Raf later moved on to changing their sound, leaving Gangsta rap behind.

In 2008, the Viennese rap group Die Vamummtn got famous over YouTube. Their amateur video Krocha Hymne in which they are referring to the youth culture "Krocha" currently has over 1 million views. The song was released by Universal Music Austria only a few months after the hype and was the first hip hop single to reach the Charts since over five years.

Only two years later, other YouTube hypes lead to a success – the song Kabinenparty by Skero, a member of Texta, reached rank 4 of the Austrian Single Charts after having become a viral video on the internet. The hip hop duo Trackshittaz succeeded in reaching rank 1 of the Single Charts with their song Oida Taunz, also shortly after having a video going viral. This was the first time that an Austrian hip hop act reached rank one of the Charts.

The probably most successful female hip hop artist is Mieze Medusa, who also organizes the monthly poetry slam textstrom.

A Carinthian crew called The Icon made waves in the Austrian Hip hop scene in 2021 by reaching 200.000 international streams on the music streaming service Apple Music.

== Dialect ==
Many Austrian hip hop artists use their mother tongue Austro-Bavarian dialects when rapping – while some do so to stay "real", others deliberately distinguish themselves from the German rap scene by doing so. For example, Fünfhaus Posse's first album was recorded in Viennese German, while standard Austrian German was used for their later ones (due to commercial reasons).

Dialect is notably often used when being ironic, while most rappers use standard German for serious texts – in the mid-2000s this led to dialect having an image of non-seriousness. Gangsta Rap artists made fun of dialect acts and were orientated towards the big German hip hop scene. This has changed in the last few years with the success of Slangsta acts (a Portmanteau of slang and gangsta) who combine serious texts with dialect, the most notably artist being Ansa.
