= Togolese hip-hop =

Hip hop music in Togo

Togolese hip-hop is hip hop music from Togo. It combines old-school American hip hop with the traditional music of Togo.

== History ==
Although hip hop was already present in West Africa as early as 1985, the movement did not reach Togo until 1990. Before graffiti, MCing, DJing, and beatboxing, breakdance was first introduced to Togo's capital, Lomé, by Bizzar MC and Wy-Kiki. It became so popular in local clubs that a school of breakdance was established Eric Mc, inspired by his experience with hip hop in Ivory Coast, created a dance group as well.

Togolese hip hop music began with the Black Syndicate, a group which consisted of O. Below and Y. More from Lomé. Eric Mc, also known as "The Black Man", won the Togo Hip Hop Awards twice with his debut album "Adjamofo".

Some Togolese hip hop contains influences from soul music.

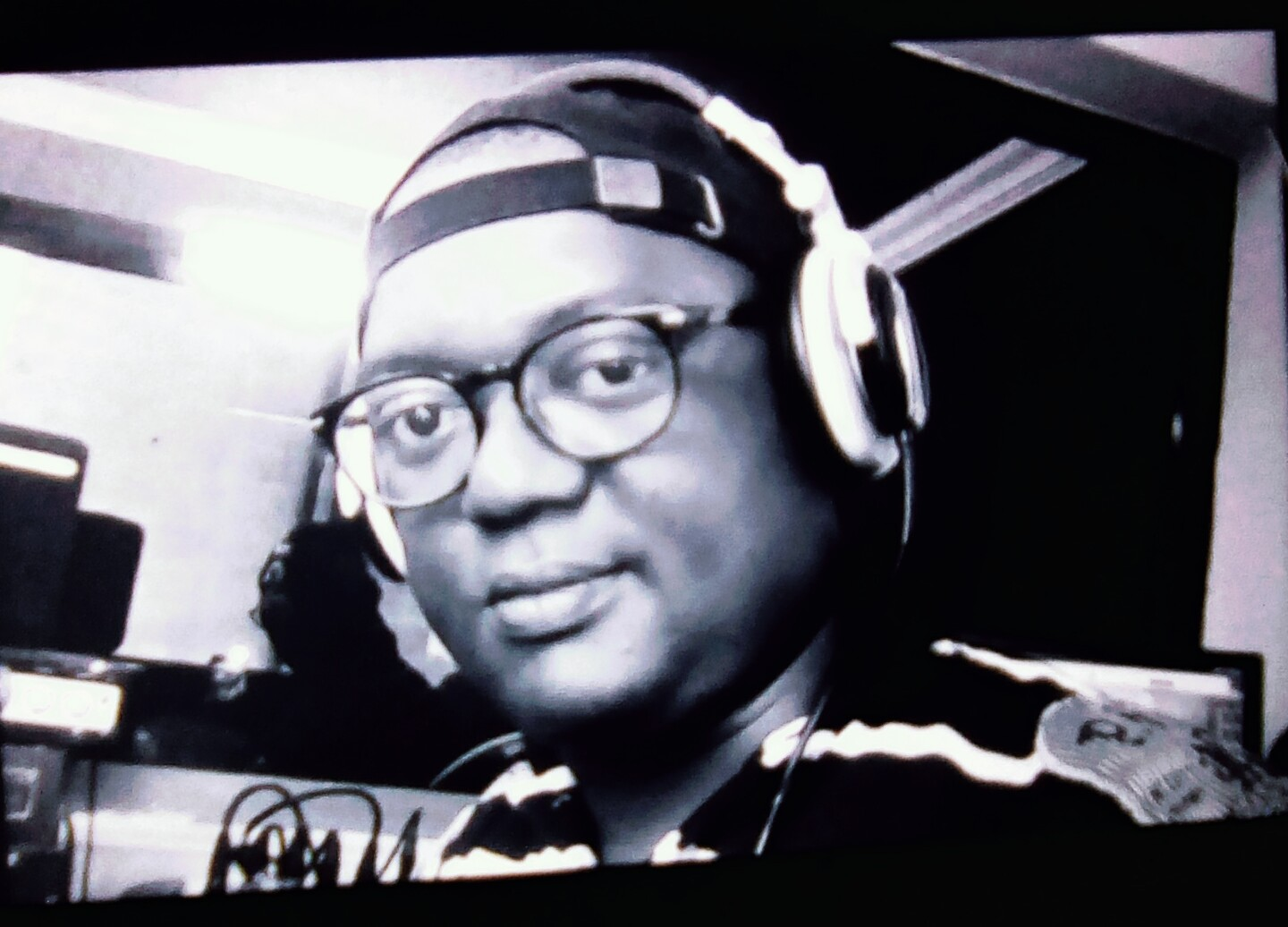
Journalist and DJ Patrice Lionel Fouda

In 1992, MC Solaar performed in a concert at the Palais des Congrès de Lomé. Force One Posse, the first official Togolese rap group, performed the opening act, along with Eric Mc, Wy-Kiki, Sino, Ali-Jezz, MC Creator, and Bad Boy. Other rap groups emerged after the concert, including "World Reality".

== Togo Hip Hop Award ==
Togolese authorities and the Minister of Culture have not regarded Togolese hip hop music as having a proper cultural identity. In 2003, the Togo Hip Hop Awards was established as an annual festival and gathering for Togolese hip hop artists.
