= Cell 7 =

Australian electronic band

Background information
- Origin: Perth, Western Australia, Australia
- Genres: Electronic, industrial, IDM
- Years active: 1998–present
- Members: Nick Mueller; Paul Harrison
- Website: Official website

Cell 7 (stylized as [ cell 7 ]) are an Australian electronic industrial duo formed in Perth, Western Australia. Forming in 1998, Cell 7 were initially influenced by IDM artists such as Autechre and Aphex Twin as well as the more mainstream sounds of Depeche Mode, the Cure and Nine Inch Nails. The band has been referred to as "endustrial" in sound, possibly to indicate the distinction between Cell 7 and the normal perception of the industrial genre. The band is a duo consisting of Nick Mueller and Paul Harrison, with occasional additional live performers.

The name Cell 7 is a reference to biological cells rather than incarceration, and the square brackets are part of the official moniker.

== History ==
Nick Mueller and Paul Harrison both grew up in the hills of Perth, attending the same primary school. Meeting up again at university, after Mueller had trained in classical music, they began experimenting with sounds and instrumentation, combining alt-metal, gothic and industrial noise elements with synthpop, techno and electronica. They built a strong local following which was recognized with Cell 7 winning 3 consecutive WAMI awards (1999, 2000, 2001) and performing live on RTRFM. A limited edition mini-album (300 signed and numbered EPs) Precognition was released, selling out in under 72 hours.

In late 2001 both members relocated to Sydney for work reasons, and Cell 7 took a hiatus from live performance. As Nick explained in a 4ZZZ radio interview – "real life got in the way".

In 2007, Nick moved to Amsterdam in the Netherlands and there completed the recording and production on a full-length album. RE:COGNITION was digitally released worldwide in late 2009, reaching number 1 on the FiXT Music store sales and critical acclaim. The album was named as one of FiXTs 'Must Have Albums', and the opening track ‘Red’ was selected by FiXT Records to be remixed by their online community, with the resulting album RED: the FiXT REMIXES released in June 2011 (containing 6 additional mixes and a previously unreleased track, Splinter).

In 2010 the Cell 7 cover version of the R.E.M. track "Losing My Religion" was selected for inclusion on the Dependent Records compilation Septic IX.

== Members ==
- Nick Mueller (vox, guitars, synthesizers, violin, percussion)
- Paul Harrison (piano, synthesizers)

Previous live members

- David Thomas (synthesizers)
- Daniel Clarke (guitars)
- Anabel Nguyen (vox, synthesizers)

== Discography ==
=== Albums ===
Title	Details
Re:Cognition	Released: 2009; Label: Cognition Records (CR001); Format: CD, digital download

=== Extended plays ===
Title	Details
Precognition	Released: 2000; Label: Cell 7; Format: CD, digital download

== Awards and nominations ==
=== West Australian Music Industry Awards ===
The Western Australian Music Industry Awards (commonly known as WAMis) are annual awards presented to the local contemporary music industry, put on by the Western Australian Music Industry Association Inc (WAM). Cell 7 won three awards.

Year	Nominee / work	Award	Result (wins only)
1999	Cell 7		Won
2000	Cell 7		Won
2001	Cell 7	Most Popular Original Goth/Industrial Act	Won
