= Úlfur Úlfur =

Icelandic hip-hop duo

- Origin: Sauðárkrókur, Iceland
- Genres: Hip hop
- Years active: 2010–present
- Members: Helgi Sæmundur Guðmundsson; Arnar Freyr Frostason

Úlfur Úlfur is an Icelandic hip-hop duo which consists of singers Arnar Freyr Frostason and Helgi Sæmundur Guðmundsson. Their first album, Föstudagurinn langi came out in 2011 and their second, Tvær plánetur, came out in 2015. In 2017, it published their third album, named Hefnið okkar (English: Revenge us).

== Discography ==
- 2011: Föstudagurinn langi
- 2015: Tvær plánetur
- 2017: Hefnið okkar
- 2023: Hamfarapopp

== Singles ==
- 2015: Brennum Allt
- 2015: Tarantúlur
- 2015: 100.000
- 2016: Barn
- 2017: Bróðir
