= Middle Eastern hip-hop =

Music genre

Middle Eastern hip-hop is hip-hop and culture originating in the Middle East. It is performed in many languages such as English, local Arabic dialects, Hebrew, Persian, and French. It is highly influenced by American hip-hop.

== Arab hip-hop ==
Arabic hip-hop refers to hip-hop developed in the Arab world. It is heavily influenced by American hip-hop, although it also fuses many aspects of local poetic traditions and culture. Common themes include social and political realities, such as poverty, drug use, and resistance to occupation. Hip-hop played an important role during the Arab Spring as a rallying chant for protesters.

== Iranian hip-hop ==
Iranian hip-hop, also known as Persian hip-hop, refers to hip-hop developed in Iran. Due to government repression, a large portion of the Iranian hip-hop scene lies underground.

== Israeli hip-hop ==
Israeli hip-hop refers to hip-hop developed in Israel. Since its development in the mid-1990s, it has grown largely free from government repression. Although some inspiration is taken from American hip-hop, hip-hop in Israel usually deals with situations in their countries, addressing issues such as poverty, criminality, and the Israeli-Palestinian Conflict.
