= Deaths in 1976 =

The following is a list of notable deaths in 1976. Entries for each day are listed alphabetically by surname. A typical entry lists information in the following sequence:

- Name, age, country of citizenship at birth, subsequent country of citizenship (if applicable), reason for notability, cause of death (if known), and reference.

== Deaths in 1976 ==
=== January ===
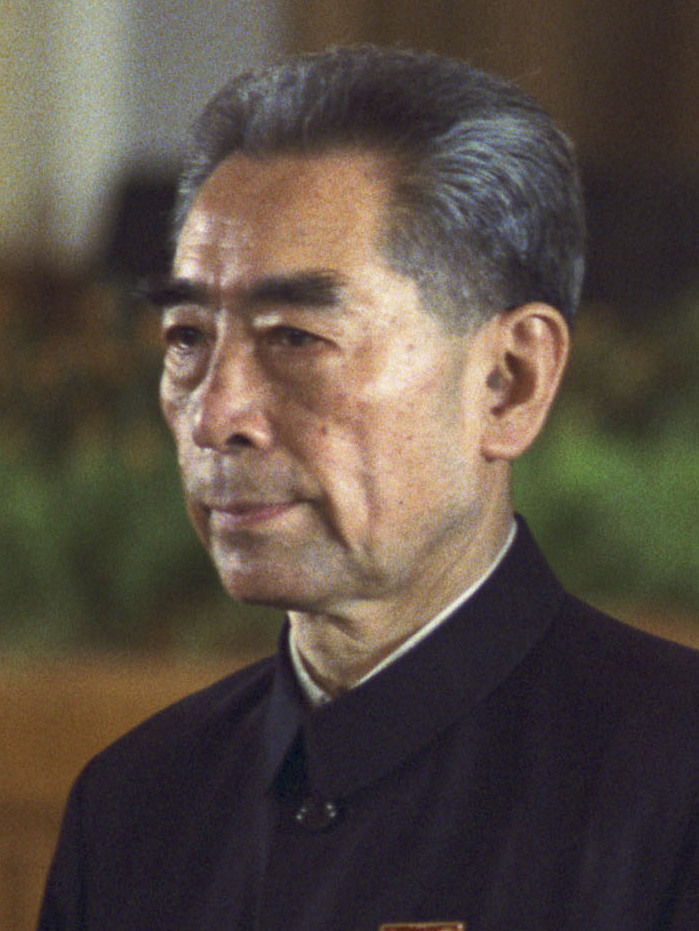
Zhou Enlai

Paul Robeson

- January 3 – John Ainsworth-Davis, Welsh surgeon and athlete (b. 1895)
- January 5
  - John A. Costello, Taoiseach of the Republic of Ireland (b. 1891)
  - Mal Evans, English road manager to the Beatles (b. 1935)
  - Károly Takács, Hungarian Olympic shooter (b. 1910)
- January 8
  - Georges Stuttler, French footballer (b. 1897)
  - Zhou Enlai, 1st Premier of China (b. 1898)
- January 10 – Howlin' Wolf, American blues singer (b. 1910)
- January 12 – Agatha Christie, English detective fiction writer (b. 1890)
- January 13 – Margaret Leighton, English actress (b. 1922)
- January 14
  - Abdul Razak Hussein, Malaysian politician, 2nd Prime Minister of Malaysia (b. 1922)
  - Muhammad Sakizli, 2nd Prime Minister of Libya (b. 1892)
- January 19 – Hidetsugu Yagi, Japanese electrical engineer (b. 1886)
- January 22 – Hermann Jónasson, Icelandic politician, 7th Prime Minister of Iceland (b. 1896)
- January 23 – Paul Robeson, American actor, singer, writer and activist (b. 1898)
- January 24 – Emil Bodnăraș, Romanian communist politician and army officer and Soviet agent (b. 1904)
- January 25 – Konstantin Anisimovich Pavlov, Latvian iconographer (b. 1907)
- January 26 – Gabriele Allegra, Italian Roman Catholic priest and blessed (b. 1907)
- January 29 – Jesse Fuller, American one-man band musician (b. 1896)
- January 30 – Arnold Gehlen, German philosopher (b. 1904)
- January 31 – Ernesto Miranda, American criminal and namesake of the Miranda right (b. 1941)

=== February ===
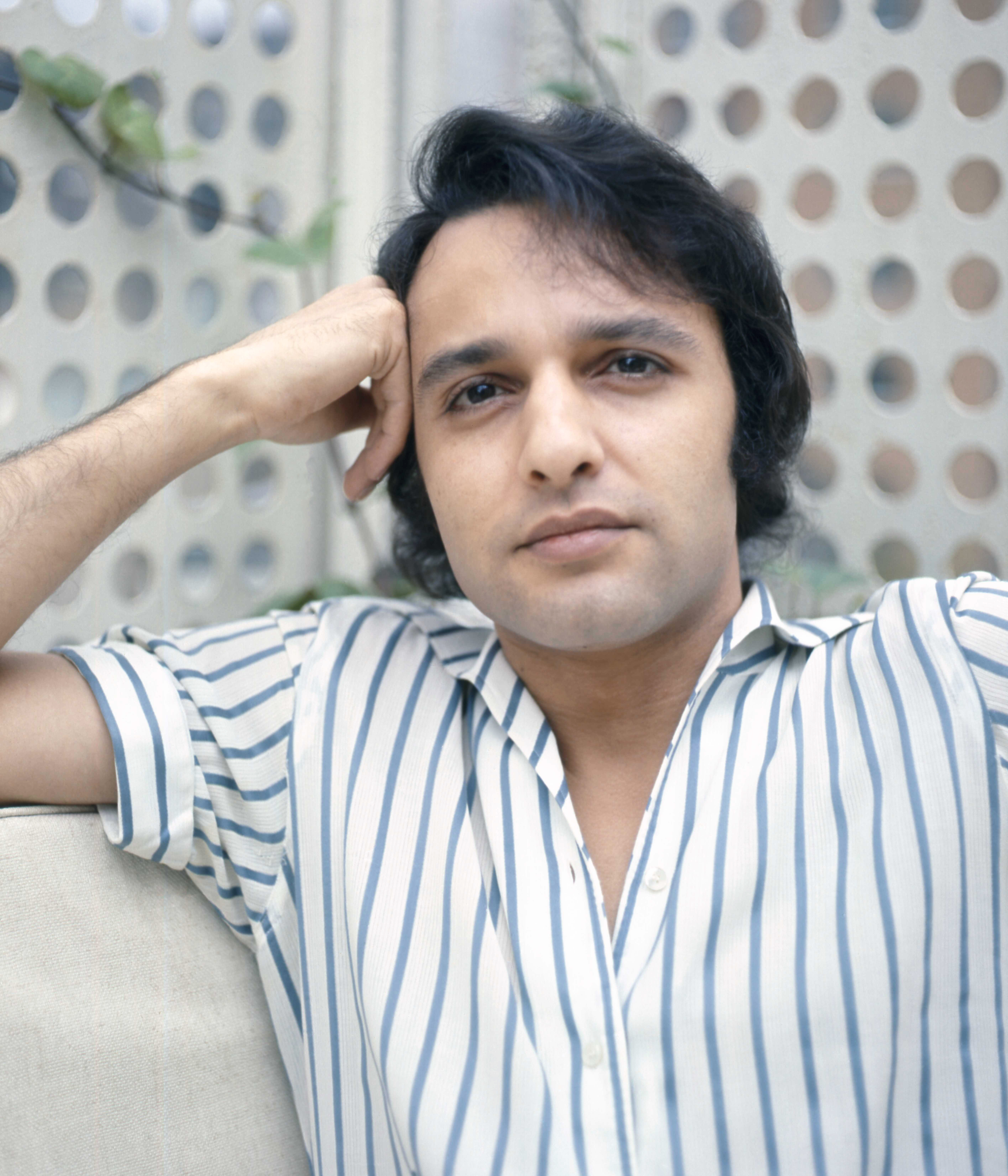
Sal Mineo

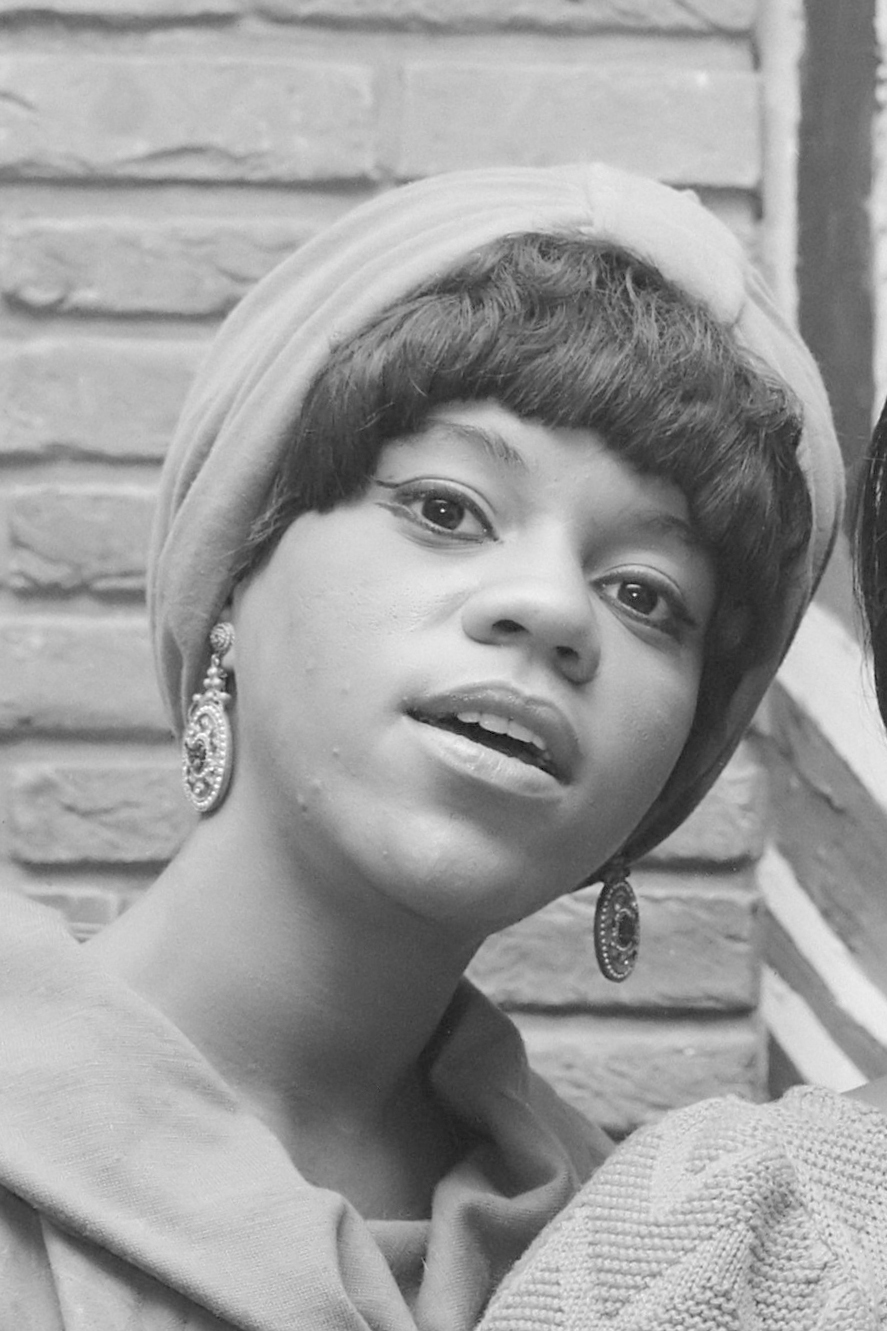
Florence Ballard

- February 1
  - Werner Heisenberg, German physicist, Nobel Prize laureate (b. 1901)
  - Hans Richter, German artist and filmmaker (b. 1888)
  - George Whipple, American scientist, recipient of the Nobel Prize in Physiology or Medicine (b. 1878)
- February 4 – Roger Livesey, Welsh actor (b. 1906)
- February 6 – Ritwik Ghatak, Bengali filmmaker and script writer (b. 1925)
- February 9 – Percy Faith, Canadian bandleader, orchestrator, composer and conductor (b. 1908)
- February 11
  - Lee J. Cobb, American actor (b. 1911)
  - Alexander Lippisch, German aeronautical engineer (b. 1894)
  - Dorothy Maud Wrinch, British mathematician and biochemical theorist (b. 1894)
- February 12 – Sal Mineo, American actor (b. 1939)
- February 13
  - Murtala Mohammed, Nigerian general (b. 1938)
  - Lily Pons, French-American operatic soprano and actress (b. 1898)
- February 14 – Sayed El Naqshabandy, Egyptian Quran reciter and nasheed artist (b. 1920)
- February 17 – Jean Servais, Belgian actor (b. 1910)
- February 20
  - René Cassin, French judge, recipient of the Nobel Peace Prize (b. 1887)
  - Kathryn Kuhlman, American evangelist and faith healer (b. 1907)
- February 22 – Florence Ballard, American singer (The Supremes) (b. 1943)
- February 23 – L. S. Lowry, British artist (b. 1887)
- February 26 – Frieda Inescort, Scottish-born actress (b. 1901)

=== March ===
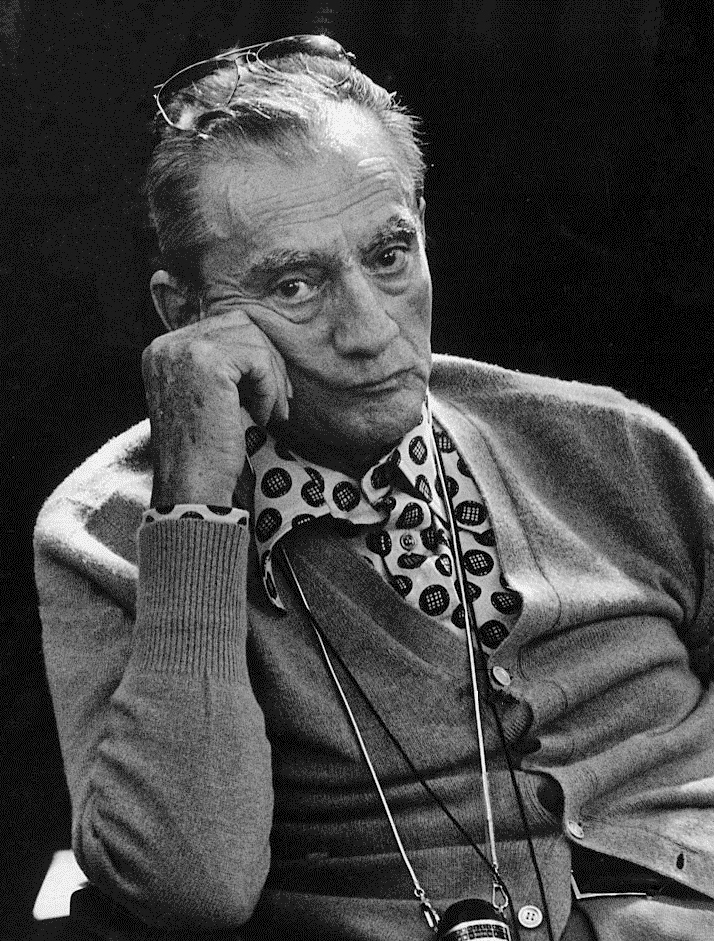
Luchino Visconti

- March 4 – Walter Schottky, German physicist (b. 1886)
- March 5 – Otto Tief, Estonian politician and military commander (b. 1889)
- March 6 – Maxie Rosenbloom, American boxer and actor (b. 1907)
- March 8 – Alfons Rebane, Estonian military commander (b. 1908)
- March 10 – Haddon Sundblom, American illustrator and artist (b. 1899)
- March 14
  - Busby Berkeley, American choreographer and director (b. 1895)
  - Jasimuddin, Bangladeshi poet, lyricist, composer and writer (b. 1903)
- March 15 – Larry Thor, Canadian actor (b. 1916)
- March 17 – Luchino Visconti, Italian theatre and film director (b. 1906)
- March 19 – Paul Kossoff, British rock guitarist (Free) (b. 1950)
- March 20 – Wilhelm Marschall, German admiral (b. 1886)
- March 24
  - Bernard Montgomery, British field marshal (b. 1887)
  - E. H. Shepard, English artist and book illustrator (b. 1879)
- March 25 – Josef Albers, German-American artist (b. 1888)
- March 28 – Richard Arlen, American actor (b. 1899)
- March 31 – Paul Strand, American photographer (b. 1890)

=== April ===
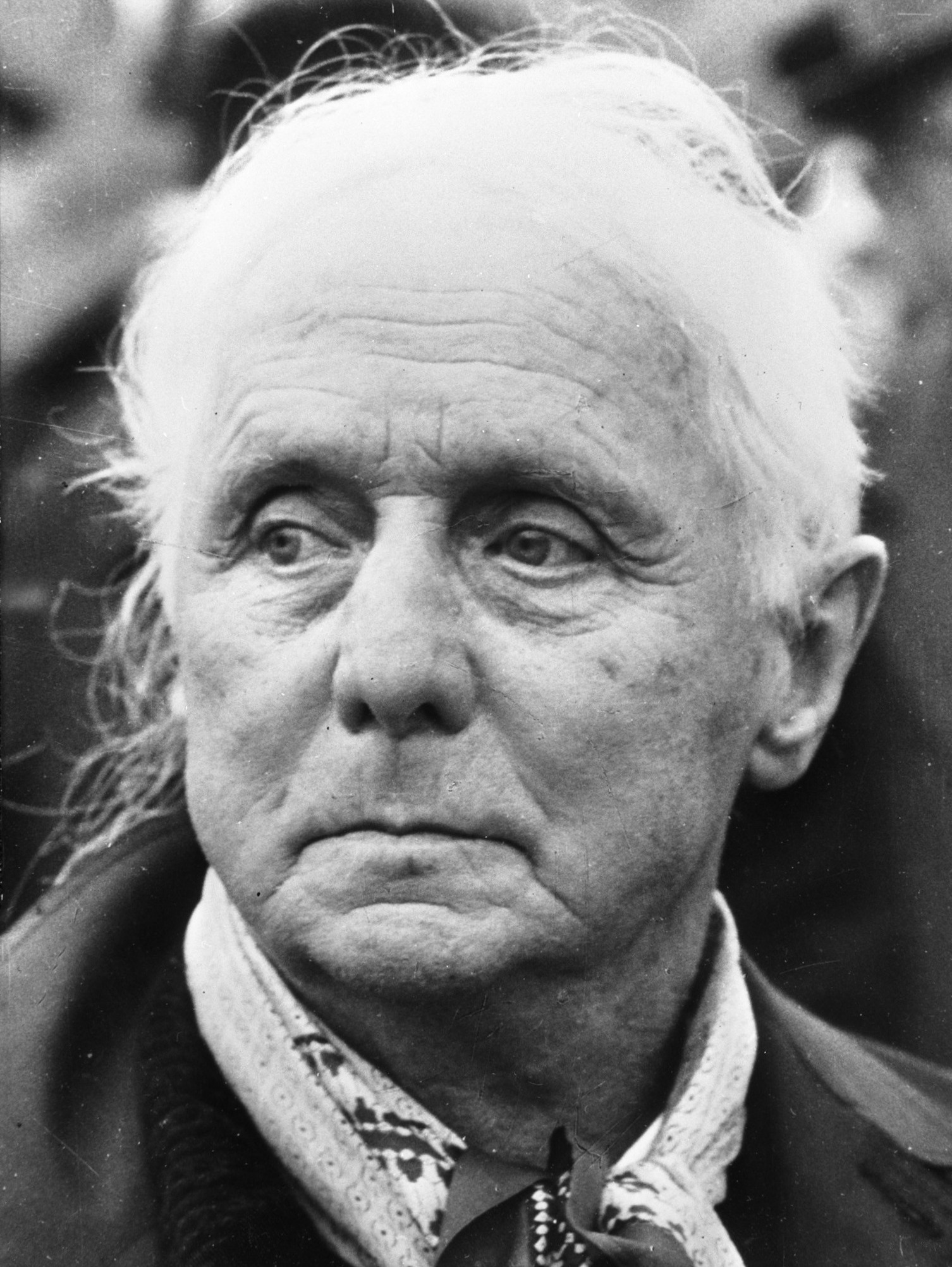
Max Ernst

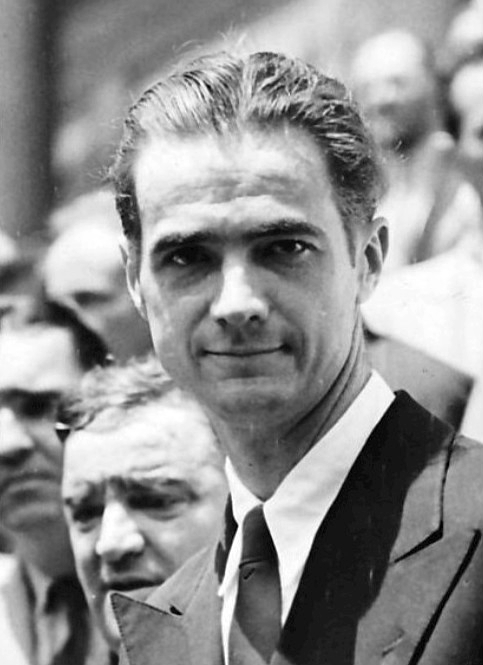
Howard Hughes

- April 1
  - Max Ernst, German artist (b. 1891)
  - Alfred Lennon, father of musician John Lennon (b. 1912)
- April 4 – Harry Nyquist, American information theory pioneer (b. 1889)
- April 5 – Howard Hughes, American aviation pioneer, film director and millionaire recluse (b. 1905)
- April 9
  - Margaret Brundage, American illustrator (Weird Tales) (b. 1900)
  - Phil Ochs, American singer-songwriter (b. 1940)
  - Renato Petronio, Italian rower, Olympic champion (1928) (b. 1891)
- April 12 – Miriam Cooper, American actress (b. 1891)
- April 13 – Sabri al-Asali, Syrian politician, 3-time Prime Minister of Syria (b. 1903)
- April 14 – Mariano Ospina Pérez, Colombian politician, 17th President of Colombia (b. 1891)
- April 16 – Batuling Bantayao Gumander, Filipino politician and Moro revolutionary leader (b. 1937)
- April 17 – Henrik Dam, Danish biochemist, recipient of the Nobel Prize in Physiology or Medicine (b. 1895)
- April 23 – Karl Schäfer, Austrian figure skater (b. 1909)
- April 25
  - Sir Carol Reed, English film director (b. 1906)
  - Markus Reiner, Israeli scientist (b. 1886)
- April 26
  - Andrei Grechko, Soviet general, Minister of Defence (b. 1903)
  - Sid James, South African-born British actor and comedian (b. 1913)

=== May ===
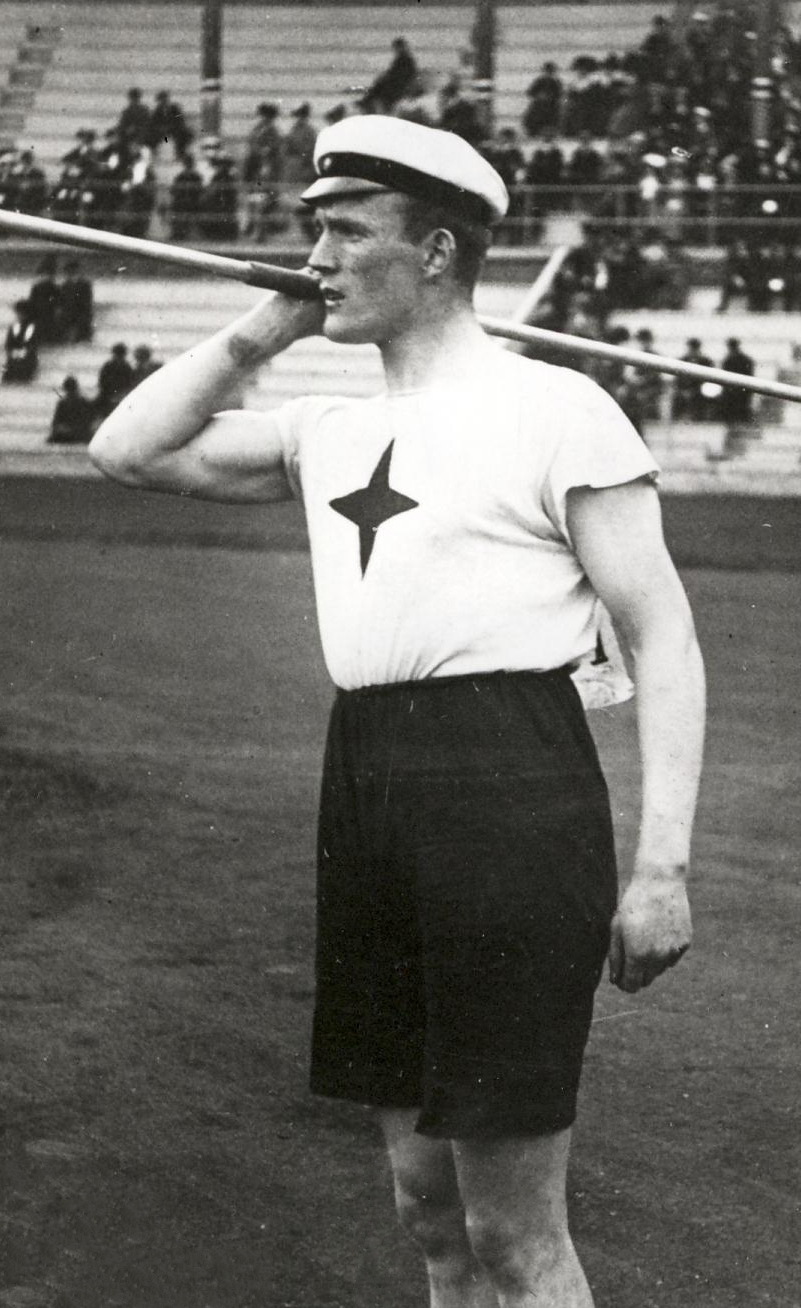
Hugo Wieslander

- May 9
  - Jens Bjørneboe, Norwegian author (b. 1920)
  - Ulrike Meinhof, German terrorist (b. 1934)
- May 11 – Alvar Aalto, Finnish architect (b. 1898)
- May 12 – Keith Relf, British rock musician (The Yardbirds) (b. 1943)
- May 15 – Samuel Eliot Morison, American historian (b. 1887)
- May 24 – Hugo Wieslander, Swedish Olympic athlete (b. 1889)
- May 26
  - Martin Heidegger, German philosopher (b. 1889)
  - Edgar Moon, Australian tennis player (b. 1904)
- May 27 – Ruth McDevitt, American actress (b. 1895)
- May 28 – Zainul Abedin, Bangladeshi painter (b. 1914)
- May 29 – Radoslav Andrea Tsanoff, Bulgarian‑American philosopher and author (b. 1887)
- May 30 – Mitsuo Fuchida, Japanese aviator, naval officer and Christian evangelist (b. 1902)
- May 31 – Jacques Monod, French biologist, recipient of the Nobel Prize in Physiology or Medicine (b. 1910)

=== June ===
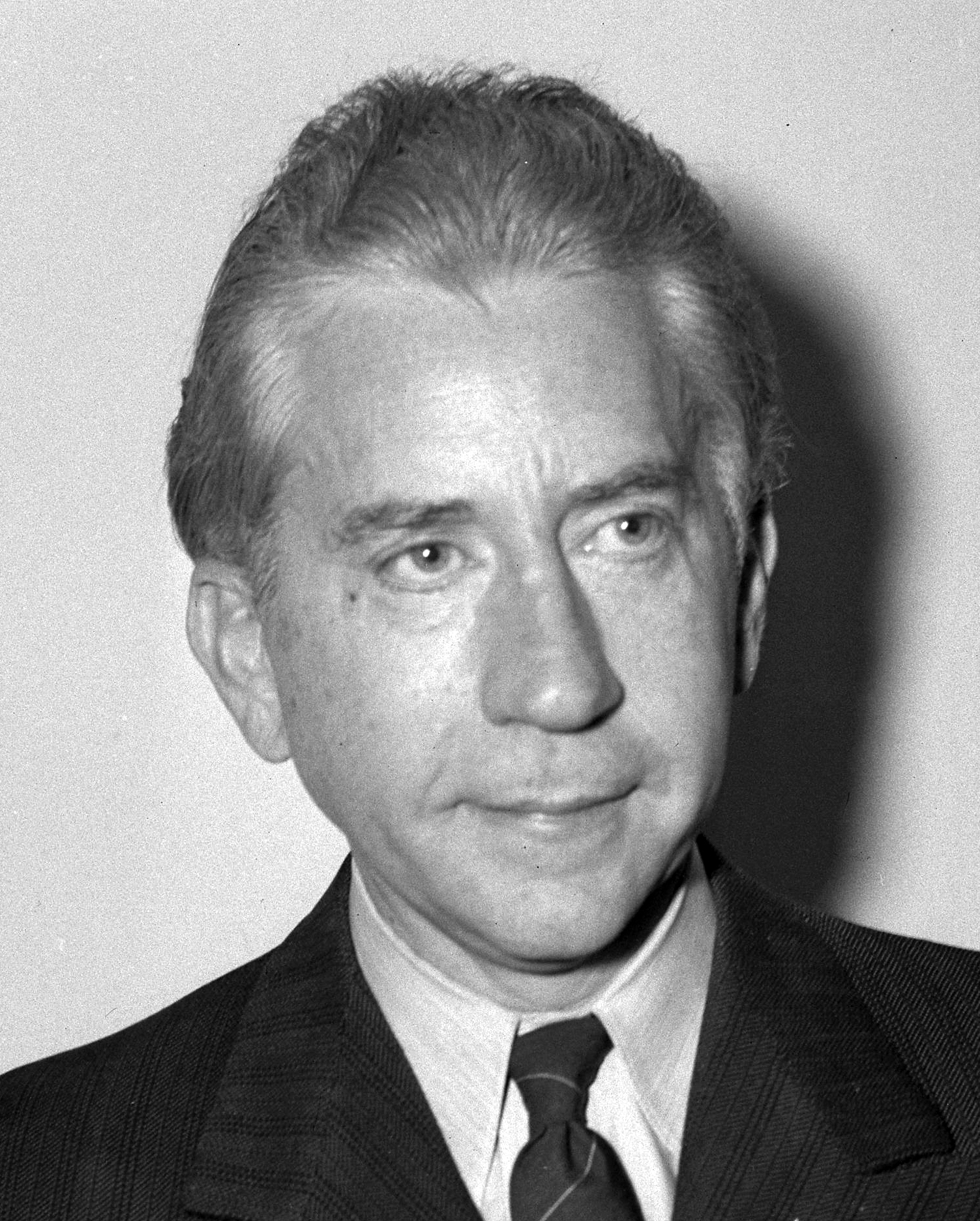
J. Paul Getty

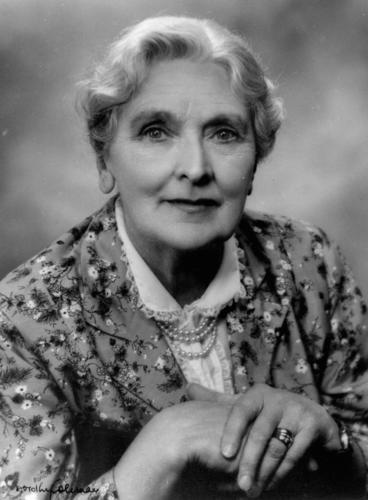
Dame Sybil Thorndike

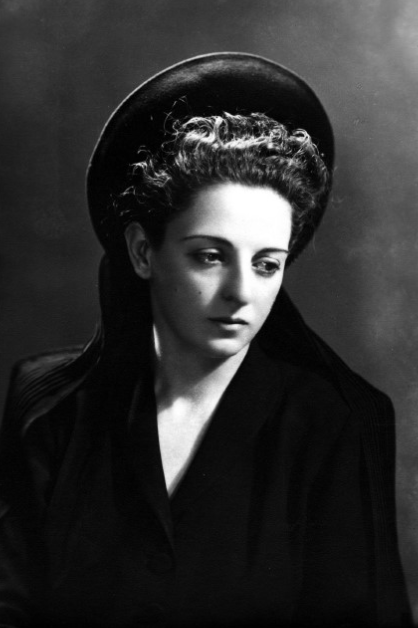
Juliette Elmir

- June 2
  - Abdul Rahman Hassan Azzam, Egyptian diplomat and politician, 1st Secretary-General of the Arab League (b. 1893)
  - Juan José Torres, Bolivian politician and military leader, 50th President of Bolivia (b. 1920)
- June 6
  - J. Paul Getty, American industrialist, founder of Getty Oil (b. 1892)
  - David Jacobs, Welsh Olympic athlete (b. 1888)
  - Fuad Stephens, Malaysian politician (b. 1920)
  - Victor Varconi, Hungarian actor (b. 1891)
- June 7
  - Bobby Hackett, American jazz musician (b. 1915)
  - Shigetarō Shimada, Japanese admiral during World War II (b. 1883)
- June 9 – Dame Sybil Thorndike, British actress (b. 1882)
- June 10 – Adolph Zukor, Hungarian-born American film producer (b. 1873)
- June 11 – Toots Mondt, American WWF promoter (b. 1894)
- June 12 – Nguyễn Ngọc Thơ, 1st Prime Minister of South Vietnam and 1st Vice President of South Vietnam (b. 1908)
- June 15 – Jimmy Dykes, American baseball player and manager (b. 1896)
- June 16 – Hector Pieterson, South African activist (b. 1963)
- June 17 – Richard Casey, Baron Casey, Australian statesman and diplomat (b. 1890)
- June 23 – DeHart Hubbard, American Olympic athlete (b. 1903)
- June 24
  - Imogen Cunningham, American photographer (b. 1883)
  - Juliette Elmir, Lebanese-Argentine nurse and political activist (b. 1909)
- June 25 – Johnny Mercer, American songwriter (b. 1909)
- June 27 – C. Wade McClusky, United States Navy admiral (b. 1902)
- June 28
  - Stanley Baker, Welsh actor and film producer (b. 1928)
  - Ruby McKim, American quilt designer (b. 1891)
- June 30 – Firpo Marberry, American baseball pitcher (b. 1898)

=== July ===
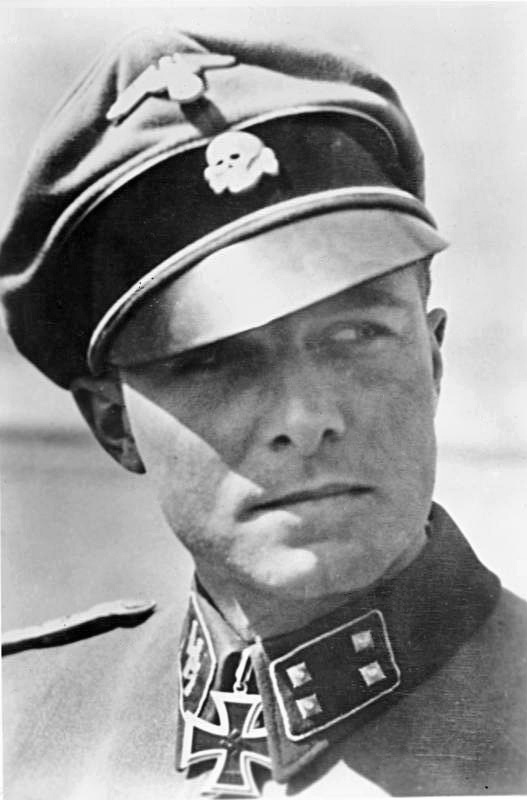
Joachim Peiper

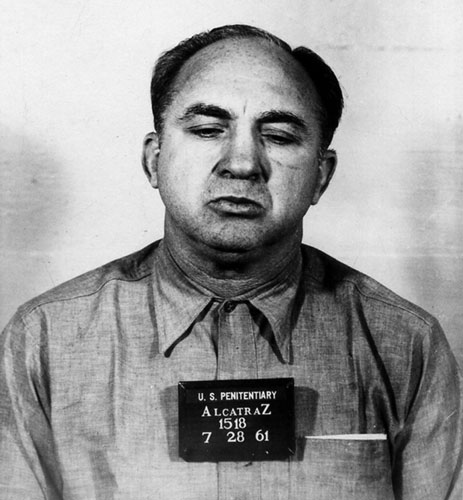
Mickey Cohen

- July 1
  - Anneliese Michel, German Roman Catholic woman who was believed to be possessed by demons (b. 1952)
  - Zhang Wentian, General Secretary of the Chinese Communist Party (b. 1900)
- July 4 – Yonatan Netanyahu, Israeli commando leader (b. 1946)
- July 6 – Zhu De, Head of State of China, China Red Army Commander-in-Chief (b. 1886)
- July 7
  - Norman Foster, American film director (b. 1903)
  - Gustav Heinemann, 6th President of the Federal Republic of Germany (b. 1899)
- July 8 – Gaston Marie Jacquier, French Roman Catholic bishop in Algeria (b. 1904)
- July 11 – León de Greiff, Colombian poet (b. 1895)
- July 12 – James Wong Howe, American cinematographer (b. 1899)
- July 14 – Joachim Peiper, German military leader (b. 1915)
- July 15 – Paul Gallico, American novelist, short story and sports writer (b. 1897)
- July 16 – Wilhelmina von Bremen, American sprint runner (b. 1909)
- July 22 – Sir Mortimer Wheeler, British archaeologist (b. 1890)
- July 23 – Basil Hopko, Czechoslovak Roman Catholic bishop and saint (b. 1904)
- July 24 – Afro Basaldella, Italian painter (b. 1912)
- July 28
  - Maggie Gripenberg, Finnish dancer and choreographer (b. 1881)
  - Lucie Mannheim, German singer and actress (b. 1899)
- July 29 – Mickey Cohen, American gangster (b. 1913)
- July 30 – Rudolf Bultmann, German Lutheran theologian (b. 1884)

=== August ===
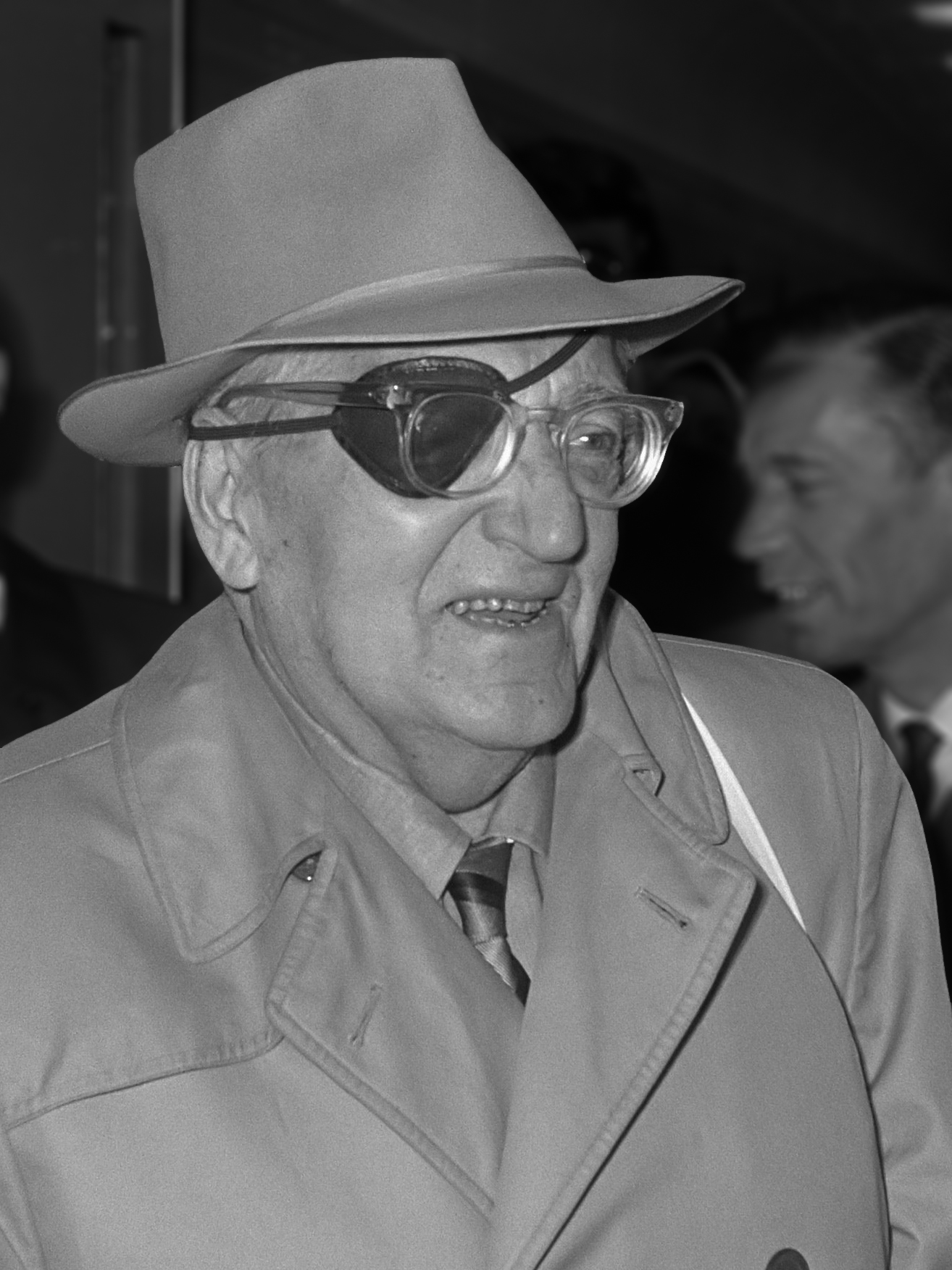
Fritz Lang

- August 2 – Fritz Lang, Austrian-German-American filmmaker, screenwriter and occasional film producer (b. 1890)
- August 4 – Roy Thomson, 1st Baron Thomson of Fleet, Canadian-born British newspaper proprietor (b. 1894)
- August 6
  - Gregor Piatigorsky, Russian-born American cellist (b. 1903)
  - Maria Klenova, Russian marine geologist (b. 1898)
  - Betty Clooney, American singer (b. 1931), sister of singer Rosemary Clooney
- August 9 – José Lezama Lima, Cuban writer and poet (b. 1910)
- August 10 – Karl Schmidt-Rottluff, German painter (b. 1884)
- August 12 – Tom Driberg, British politician and journalist (b. 1905)
- August 22 – Juscelino Kubitschek, 21st President of Brazil (b. 1902)
- August 25 – Eyvind Johnson, Swedish novelist, recipient of the Nobel Prize in Literature (b. 1900)
- August 26 – Lotte Lehmann, German soprano (b. 1888)
- August 28 – Anissa Jones, American actress and student (b. 1958)
- August 29
  - Kazi Nazrul Islam, Bangladeshi national poet (b. 1899)
  - Jimmy Reed, American blues musician (b. 1925)

=== September ===
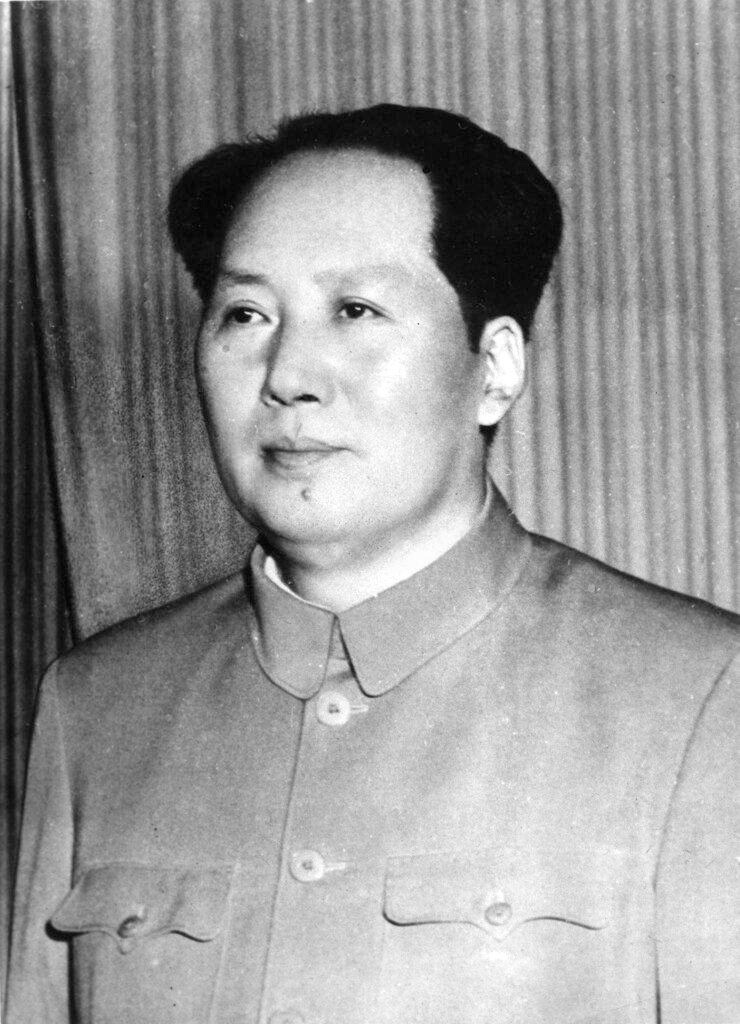
Mao Zedong

- September 5 – Arthur Gilligan, English cricketer (b. 1894)
- September 9 – Mao Zedong, Chinese revolutionary and political theorist, Chairman of the Chinese Communist Party (b. 1893)
- September 10 – Dalton Trumbo, American screenwriter and novelist (b. 1905)
- September 13 – Camilo Ponce Enríquez, Ecuadorian politician, 30th President of Ecuador (b. 1912)
- September 14 – Prince Paul of Yugoslavia, (b. 1893)
- September 15 – Josef Sudek, Czech photographer (b. 1896)
- September 16 – Bertha Lutz, Brazilian zoologist, politician, diplomat and feminist (b. 1894)
- September 19
  - Yehezkel Abramsky, Russian-born British rabbi (b. 1886)
  - Choi Yong-kun, North Korean general and defence minister (b. 1900)
  - Robert Mellard, American US Army soldier (b. 1919)
- September 21 – Orlando Letelier, Chilean economist, politician and diplomat (assassinated) (b. 1932)
- September 26 – Leopold Ružička, Yugoslav chemist, Nobel Prize laureate (b. 1887)
- September 28 – Raymond Collishaw, Canadian World War I fighter ace (b. 1893)

=== October ===
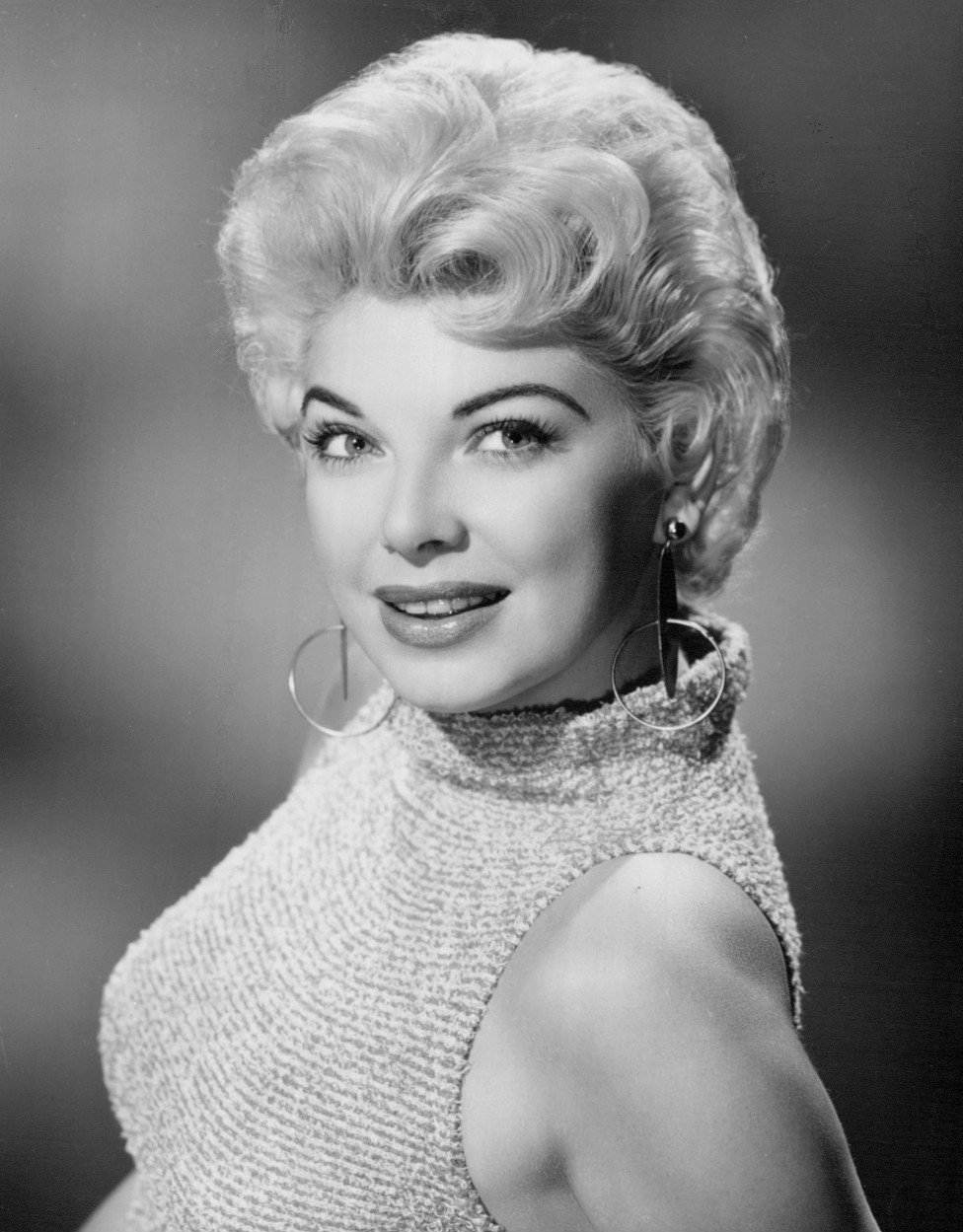
Barbara Nichols

- October 5
  - Lars Onsager, Norwegian-born American physical theoretical physicist, 1968 Nobel Prize laureate (b. 1903)
  - Barbara Nichols, American actress (b. 1928)
- October 6 – Gilbert Ryle, British philosopher (b. 1900)
- October 9 – Troy H. Middleton, American general and educator (b. 1889)
- October 10 – Silvana Armenulić, Yugoslav singer (b. 1939)
- October 11 - Connee Boswell, American popular and jazz singer (b. 1907)
- October 14
  - Dame Edith Evans, British actress (b. 1888)
  - Suleiman Nabulsi, Prime Minister of Jordan (b. 1908)
- October 15 – Carlo Gambino, Italian-American mobster (b. 1902)
- October 18 – Giacomo Lercaro, Italian Roman Catholic cardinal (b. 1891)
- October 25 – Raymond Queneau, French writer (b. 1903)
- October 31 – Eileen Gray, Irish furniture designer (b. 1878)

=== November ===
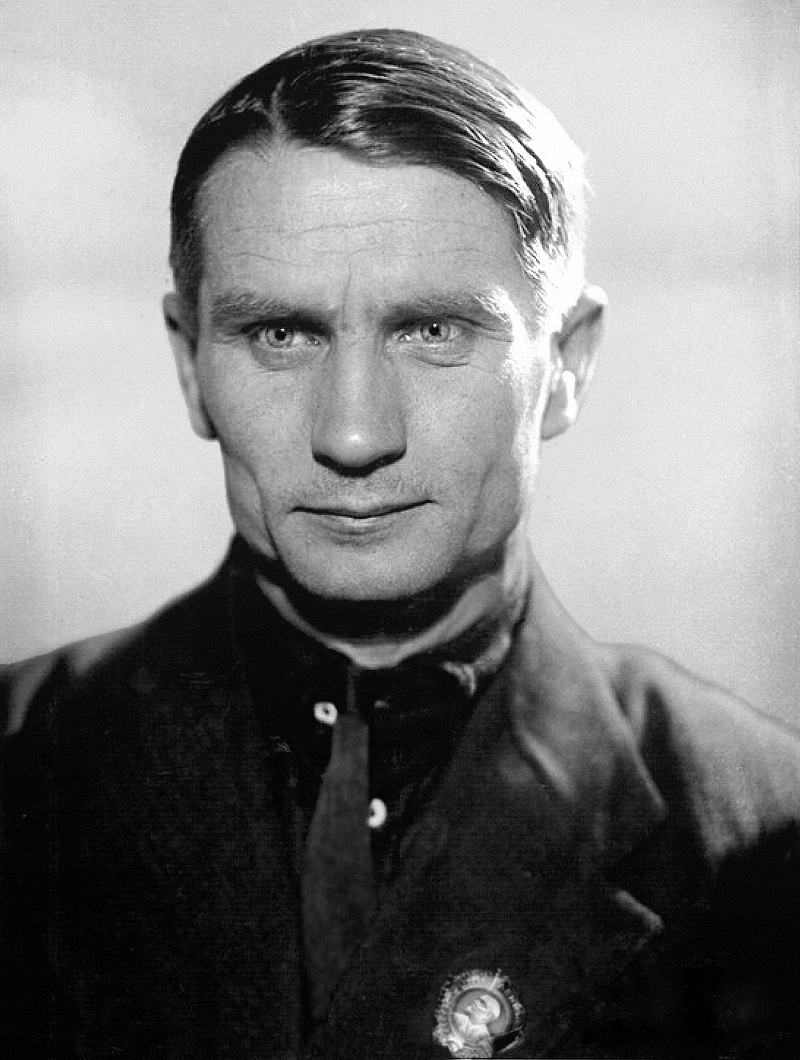
Trofim Lysenko

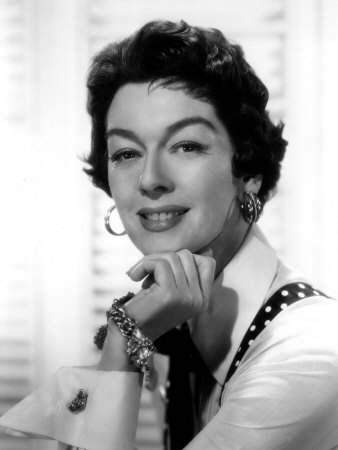
Rosalind Russell

- November 3 – Solange d'Ayen, French noblewoman, Duchess of Ayen and journalist (b. 1898)
- November 8 – Gottfried von Cramm, German tennis player (b. 1909)
- November 9
  - Helen Palmatary, American anthropologist (b. 1884)
  - Armas Taipale, Finnish Olympic athlete (b. 1890)
- November 11 – Alexander Calder, American sculptor (b. 1898)
- November 12 – Walter Piston, American composer (b. 1894)
- November 15 – Jean Gabin, French actor (b. 1904)
- November 18 – Man Ray, American artist (b. 1890)
- November 20 – Trofim Lysenko, Soviet biologist and agronomist of Ukrainian origin (b. 1898)
- November 23 – André Malraux, French novelist (b. 1901)
- November 28 – Rosalind Russell, American actress (b. 1907)
- November 29 – Godfrey Cambridge, American comedian and actor (b. 1933)
- November 30 – Ivan Yakubovsky, Marshal of the Soviet Union (b. 1912)

=== December ===
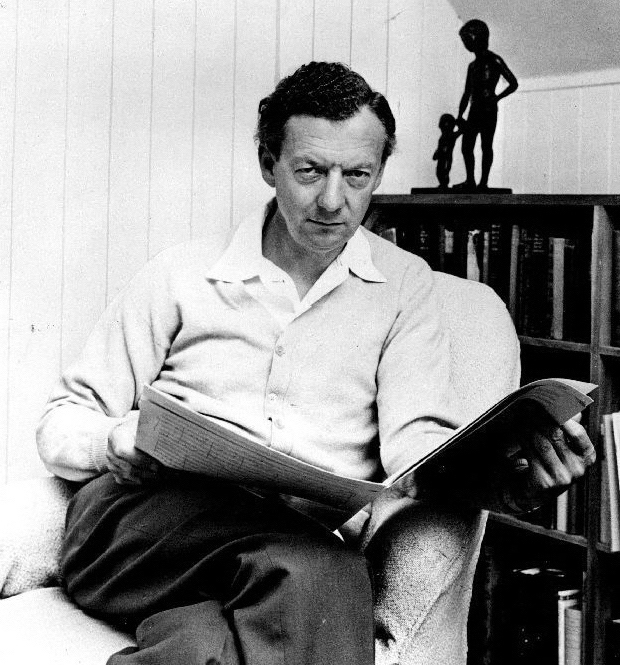
Benjamin Britten

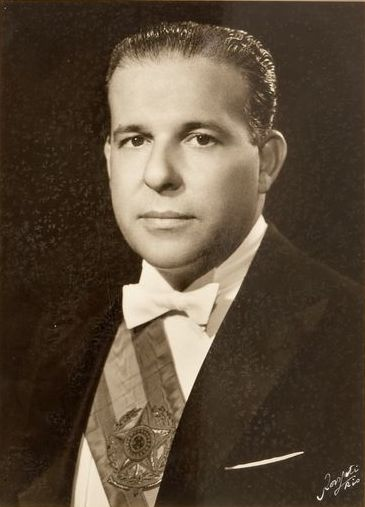
João Goulart

- December 2 – Danny Murtaugh, American baseball player and manager (b. 1917)
- December 3
  - Alfredo Dinale, Italian Olympic cyclist (b. 1900)
  - Angelo Iachino, Italian admiral (b. 1889)
  - Mary Nash, American actress (b. 1884)
- December 4
  - Tommy Bolin, American guitarist (b. 1951)
  - Benjamin Britten, English composer (b. 1913)
- December 6 – João Goulart, Brazilian politician, 24th President of Brazil (b. 1918)
- December 12 – Jack Cassidy, American actor (b. 1927)
- December 15 – Grégoire Kayibanda, Rwandan politician, 2nd President of Rwanda (b. 1924)
- December 20
  - Richard J. Daley, American politician (b. 1902)
  - Ned Washington, American lyricist (b. 1901)
- December 24 – Duarte Nuno, Duke of Braganza, pretender to the Portuguese throne (b. 1907)
- December 28 – Freddie King, American blues guitarist (b. 1934)

=== Date unknown ===
- Aleksander Wachniewski, Polish engineer and politician (b. 1891)

⁸==References==
