= Marwan Pablo =

Egyptian rapper (born 1995)

- Born: Marwan Ahmed Motawea; 22 November 1995 (age 30); Alexandria, Egypt
- Other names: Marwan Dama; Godfather of Egyptian trap
- Occupations: Rapper; songwriter; singer; record producer
- Years active: 2015–present
- Musical career
- Genre: Hip-hop

Marwan Ahmed Motawea (Arabic: مروان أحمد مطاوع, born November 22, 1995), better known by his stage name Marwan Pablo (مروان بابلو) is an Egyptian rapper from Alexandria. Pablo is one of the pioneers of trap music in Egypt, for which he is often nicknamed "The Egyptian Godfather of Trap". Some of his best known singles include Ghaba, El Gemeza, Sindbad.

== Career ==
=== Beginnings ===
Marwan Pablo began making music in 2015 and went by the stage name 'Dama.' In late 2017, he released a single, Al Gholaf X Ozoris, under the name of Marwan Pablo, in reference to Pablo Escobar and Pablo Picasso, as he mentions in his single, Ctrl. Pablo began his career writing lyrics then started producing tracks.

Pablo's first career-driven goal was to familiarize his hometown of Alexandria with trap music. In 2018, he created his first breakthrough song, 3ayz Fin, after it was remixed by the popular Mahraganat artist, Sadat. He also starred in the Rabka documentary and, in 2019, released Sindbad. The majority of Pablo tracks in 2019 were collaborations with the Egyptian producer Molotof; most of Pablo's fans believe this was his golden era, as he created musical projects in collaboration with Molotof such as El Gemeza and Free. All of these projects have made major impacts on the Rap scene in both Egypt and the entirety of the Middle East.

=== Hiatus ===
On February 14, 2020, Pablo announced that, for personal and religious reasons, he would no longer be making music. Shortly after, he blanked his YouTube channel and Instagram account, later stating that the main reason he retired was "the pressure that was forced on him, the different levels of expectations that people have cornered him within, and the constant labeling". He said that he needed a break to "recharge himself without being cornered". On March 9, 2020, Pablo went on Instagram in response to rumours of his illness or death, and was angry over the anecdotes and denied any relation between the retirement and his health or family members.

His track Denamet (with Molotof) was the runner-up in Egypt's top 5 list in July 2020.

=== Return ===
In January 2021, Pablo was speculated to return after his profile picture on Facebook was changed. He did not confirm his return.

On February 19, a leaked video on Twitter went viral after showcasing Pablo working on a new song and preparing for his return. His name topped the trending list on Twitter that day in Egypt.

On February 25, Pablo released a single, Ghaba (transl. Jungle), and reactivated his social media accounts. Pablo's comeback music video gained more than 4 million views on YouTube within the first 24 hours and was on the platform's top 10 trending.

On March 29, he announced an EP named CTRL containing 5 singles: Ghaba, El Hob Fein, CTRL, DON, and ATARY; the latter being a previously released, unfinished track, before Pablo's retirement.

On October 1, 2021, Pablo held a concert in New Cairo, accompanied by Palestinian rap group BLTNM members Shabjdeed, Al Nather, and Shabmouri. The tickets sold out and the concert was attended by over twenty six thousand people. Shortly after the concert, the Egyptian Musicians' Syndicate banned Pablo from performing because of Shabjdeed's actions during the concert, which included changing the lyrics of a religious chant by Sayed Al-Naqshabandi to welcome Pablo on stage, as well as performing songs with obscene lyrics.

== Personal life ==
Pablo is a practicing Muslim.

== Discography ==
=== Main Studio Albums ===
Year	Original Title	Translation	Label
2023	ʾākhir ʾiṭʿa fanniyya (Arabic: آخر قطعة فنية)	The Last Piece of Art	Quality Clique

=== EPs ===
Year	Original Title	Translation	Label
2026	5 NZAM (Arabic: 5 نظام)	System 5/5	Quality Clique
2025	EN7RAF (Arabic: إنحراف)	Deviation	Quality Clique
2024	7OB&KASHAT (Arabic: حب وكاشات)	Love & money	Quality Clique
2024	PRJKTBLUBEAM (Arabic: پروچكت بلو بيم)	Project Blue Beam	Quality Clique
2021	CTRL (Arabic: كنترول)	CTRL	Independent
