= Al Nather =

Palestinian rapper and producer (born 1993)

Al Nather الناظر
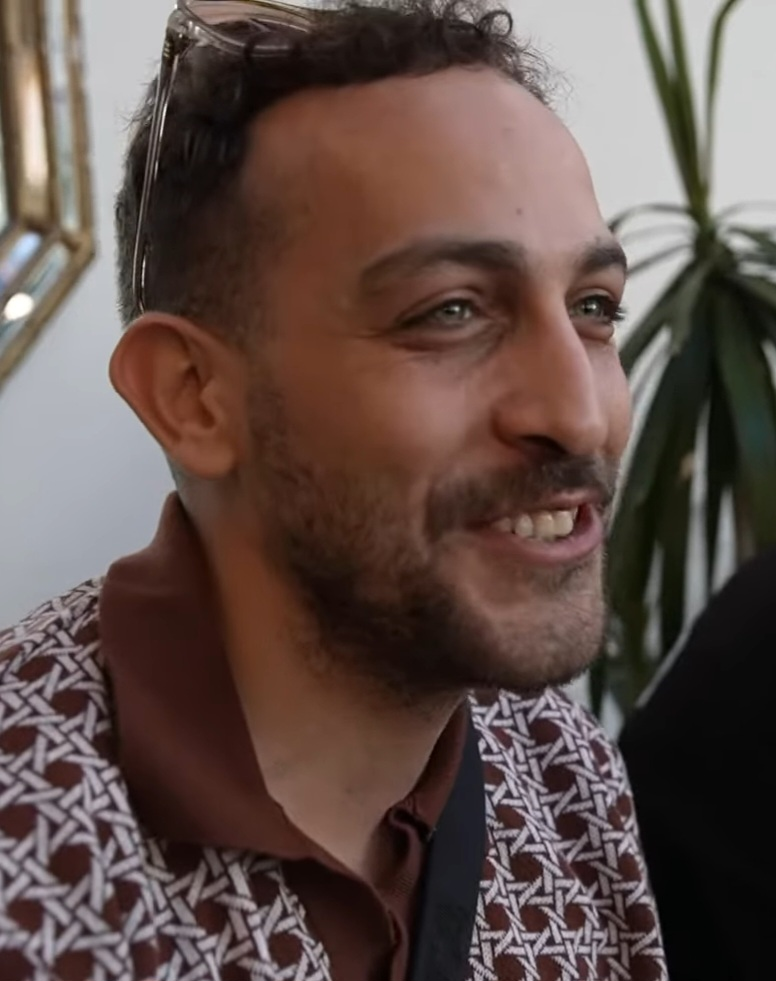
- Al Nather in 2023

Background information
- Born: Mohammad Masrouji; 1993 (age 32–33); Ramallah, Palestine
- Genres: Palestinian hip hop
- Occupations: Rapper; singer; songwriter; record producer
- Years active: 2014–present

Mohammad Masrouji (Arabic: محمد مسروجي; born 1993), known professionally as Al Nather (Arabic: الناظر), is a Palestinian rapper and record producer. He is associated with the Ramallah-based independent label and collective BLTNM. Masrouji gained global exposure thanks to a Boiler Room documentary about the Palestinian underground. He has collaborated with El Rass, Synaptik, Haykal, and DJ Makimakkuk.

== Style ==
Al Nather's lyrics present one of the first and strongest manifestations of the Palestinian street music scene, with controversial performances that sometimes divided the public and critics according to the Palestinian specter and their struggle for determination. "Everything I do is centered and based on the Palestinian cause and struggle, emphasizing the problem, if the Israeli soldiers start shooting, we will not stop the interview," he told the British media outlet The Guardian.

== Career ==
Al Nather started as a producer of several collaborative release series under BLTNM, with rapper Shabjdeed. In 2019, he published Sindibad el Ward in collaboration with Shabjdeed. This album has been hailed as a turning point for Arab hip-hop. AlNather also collaborated on the song "Mtaktak" with Shabjdeed, recognized by the BBC as one of the greatest hits of modern Arab hip-hop.

Al Nather has a monthly radio show titled "MashALLAH w/ Al Nather," broadcast from Ramallah on NTS, where he presents his international experimental audio and sound vision of the Gaza war.

== Discography ==
=== EPs ===
- Fi Swat (2024)
- Amrikkka (2025)

=== Albums ===
- Sindibad Al Ward (2019)
