= Sayed El Naqshabandy =

Egyptian Quran reciter (1920–1976)

Sayed Mohamed Al-Naqshabandi
- سيد محمد النقشبندي
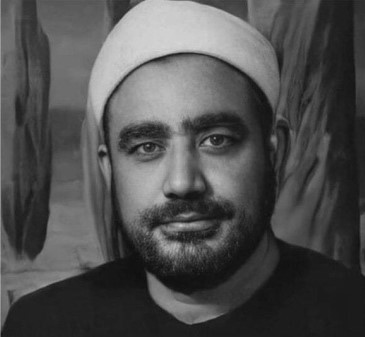

Personal life
- Born: January 7, 1920 Dimayrah, Dakahlia Governorate, Egypt
- Died: February 14, 1976 (aged 56) Cairo, Egypt
- Cause of death: Heart attack

Religious life
- Religion: Islam

Sayed Mohamed Al-Naqshabandi (7 January 1920 – 14 February 1976), also known as Sayed Al-Naqshabandi, was an Egyptian Qur'an reciter and nasheed artist.

== Early life and career ==
Sayed Al-Naqshabandi was born on 7 January 1920 in Dimayrah to a Sufi sheikh. His family relocated to Tahta in Upper Egypt, and it was there where Al-Naqshabandi studied the Quran and began practicing performing religious nasheeds. In 1955, at the age of 35, he started performing publicly reciting the Quran, as well as performing nasheeds. In 1967, he was accredited as a senior religious singer of Egyptian Radio, and began to frequently appear on the national radio, especially during the holy month of Ramadan.

== Death ==
Al-Naqshabandi died on 14 February 1976 due to a heart attack.

== In popular culture ==
During the 2021 Africa Cup of Nations, a version of Al-Naqshabandi's nasheed titled “Walk in the light of god, hold up your hands and pray to god” spread in Egyptian social media. On 1 October 2021, in a concert that was held by Egyptian rapper Marwan Pablo and Palestinian rapper Shabjdeed in New Cairo, Shabjdeed sang a modified version of Al-Naqshabandi's famous ‘Mawlay Enni Bebaboka,’ (My Lord, I am at your door), where ‘Mawlay’ is replaced with "Marwan,’ I'm at your door". The song caused outrage on Egyptian and Muslim social media, and the Egyptian musicians syndicate banned Pablo from performing in public.

In 2022, a book about Al-Naqshabandi was written by Egyptian author Rahma Diaa.
