= Konstantin Anisimovich Pavlov =

K. Pavlov iconographer

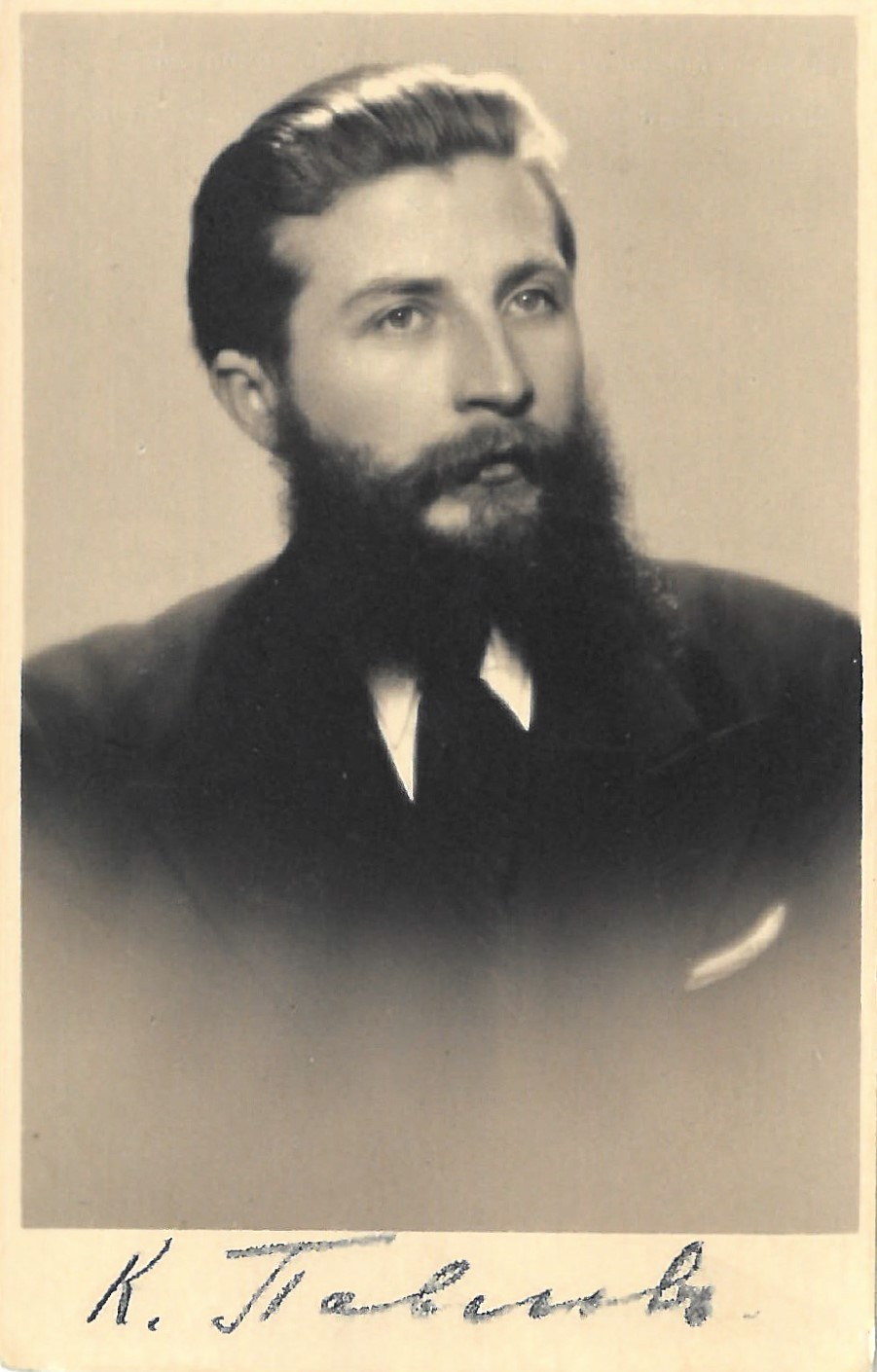
Konstantin Anisimovich Pavlov, Riga 1937

Konstantin Anisimovich Pavlov (Russian: Константин Анисимович Павлов, Latvian: Konstantīns Pavlovs) (May 27, 1907, Jēkabpils, Russian Empire – January 25, 1976, Riga, Latvian SSR) was a Latvian-born iconographer and restorer.

He was one of the founders of the first icon-painting workshop and a member of the Grebenshchikov House of Prayer in Riga, the world's largest Old Believer church. Pavlov was also a founding member of the study group "Circle of Devotees of Russian Antiquity", established on June 2, 1927.

== Childhood, youth and education ==
Konstantin Anisimovich Pavlov was born on May 27, 1907 to Glikeriya Fedot'evna and Anisim Minovich Pavlov; a family of Old Believers; in Jēkabpils, Russian Empire. His younger brother Mikhail was born on May 27, 1910. Both brothers faced many hardships in their youth. Their father, Anisim Minovich, owned a small store near Brody, by Jēkabpils, and was a wealthy and compassionate member of the Jēkabpils Old Believer community. However, he died when Konstantin was only 6 years old. Their widowed mother, Glikeriya, struggled to raise her sons, but the people and the Old Believer community supported them.

In 1925, Pavlov moved to Riga and enrolled in a technical school, where he studied for two years. During this time, he lived at the Grebenstchikov House of Prayer, and served as a choir singer at the Uspenskaya Church from September 10, 1925, to December 7, 1926. After serving in the Latvian army, in 1930, Pavlov became a permanent singer at the Grebenstchikov House of Prayer, as well as one of the first members of the study group "Circle of Devotees of Russian Antiquity", established in 1927, in which he actively participated.

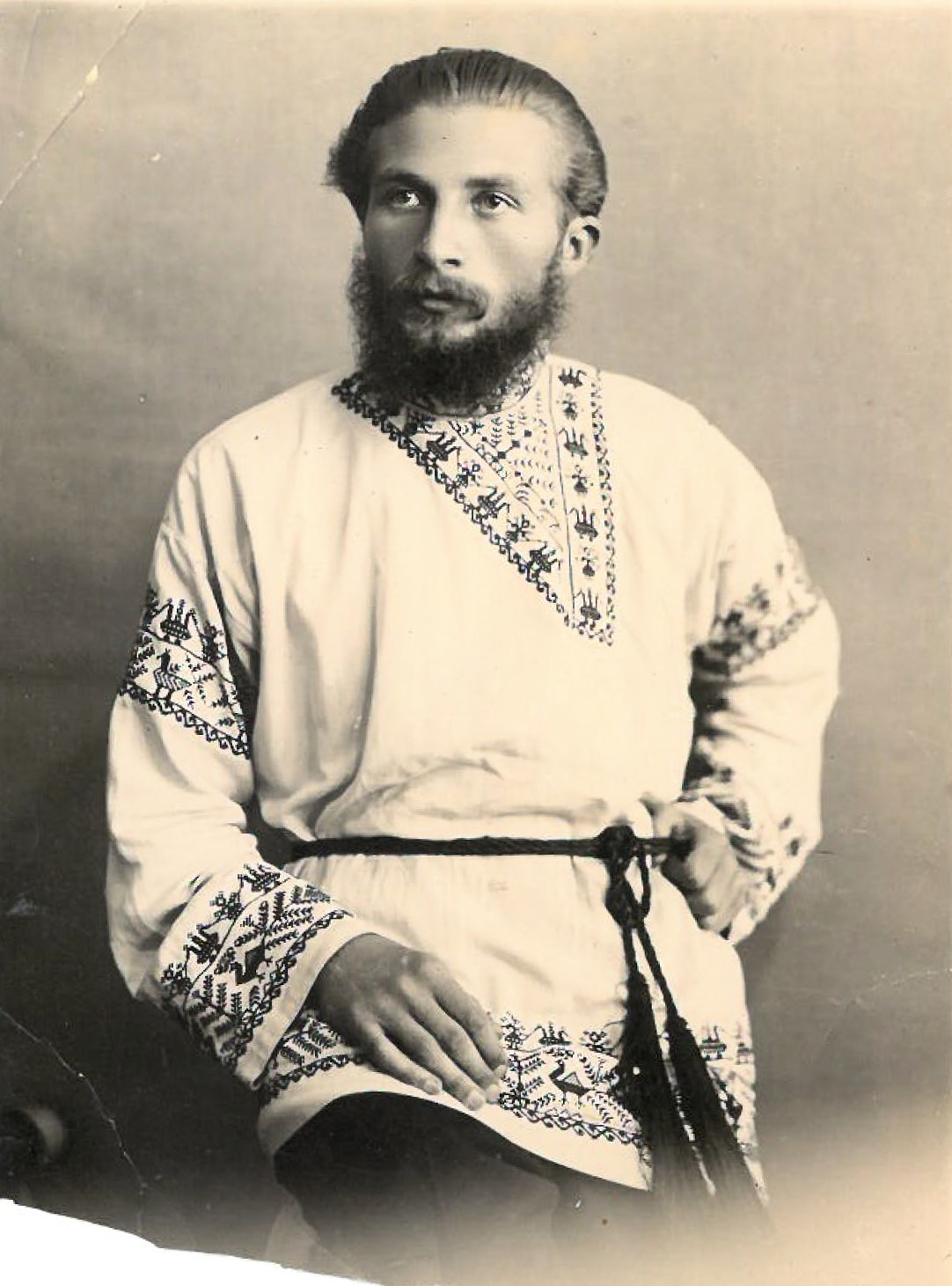
Konstantin Anisimovich Pavlov. Riga, June 4, 1933

== Icon painting workshop, artistic style and philosophy ==
At the initiative of the members of the study group, in 1928, an icon-painting workshop was established at the Grebenstchikov House of Prayer. The iconographers in the workshop aimed to preserve the ancient Russian traditions of icon painting, viewing the icons as a source of spiritual revival. The workshop worked in two directions: the restoration of ancient monuments and the study and revival of ancient iconographic traditions.

From 1928 to 1930, the workshop's artists studied under the prominent iconographer Pimen Maximovich Sofronov (1898–1973); among them were Yuri Rykovsky, Evgeny Klimov, and the professor of the University of Latvia and lawyer Vasily Sinaiisky. In 1930, Pavlov himself became a student of Sofronov. In 1931, Sofronov immigrated to Paris, Prague, Belgrade, Rome, and finally the United States, where he also established icon-painting workshops.

After the departure of his teacher, Pavlov continued working at the workshop, of which he gave a description: "I am only able to work properly and systematically here thanks to the Council of the Riga Grebenstchikov Old Believer community and "Circle of Devotees of Russian Antiquity", represented by I.N. Zavoloko. I owe them everything. In this room where I live and work, P.M. Sofronov once lived. After all, he is my teacher. Now he lives in Yugoslavia with His Holiness Patriarch Varnava of Serbia, where he runs a large icon-painting workshop with more than 30 students, including Bishop John (Pechersky).

In 1933, he restored icons at the Voitishskaya Old Believer Church. In 1935-1936, he worked on restoring the iconostasis at the Old Believer chapel of the Assumption of the Blessed Virgin in Jelgava, while simultaneously fulfilling orders from private individuals. For example, in 1936, Pavlov completed an order from the American Vice-Consul Leslie Gordon Mayer, painting the images of "St. Lawrence" and "St. Andrew the "First-Called".

In the 1930s, several articles about Pavlov were written in the Riga newspapers. He had a large collection of books, ancient icons, and photographs of ancient icons, which he carefully studied. Pavlov, like other Old Believer iconographers, was deeply moved by the words of Protopope Avvakum: "By God's permission, in our Russian land, there appeared iconographers who were unworthy of the art. They paint the image of Christ the Savior – the face is swollen, the lips are red, the hair curly, the hands and feet fat... Everything is painted by carnal thought, because the heretics themselves love bodily fatness and refute the upper parts..."

Master of Arts, Victoria Alexandrovna, on Konstantin Anisimovich's iconography: "K. Pavlov... did not aim to paint saints to emphasize their earthly, bodily beauty. But following the traditions of ancient icon painting, he sought to depict the faces of saints so that the one praying could approach an understanding of the Divine and see the beauty of Heaven, the beauty of the image of God. It is also worth noting that, in accordance with the Pomor tradition of icon painting, Pavlov painted faces with 'moderate delicacy,' i.e., in the depiction of saints, he avoided excessive, intrusive asceticism, as well as the puffiness and corpulence that Protopope Avvakum noticed in icons painted in imitation of Western painting of the 17th century. Often, Pavlov's style also had a graphic character: the lines were clear, straight, dry, sometimes harsh. But Pavlov always painted strictly within the framework of the canon and iconography developed by Byzantine and ancient Russian iconographers (before the 17th century)",.

In the 1930s, Pavlov was involved in teaching and educational activities, giving lectures as part of the program of the study group "Circle of Devotees of Russian Antiquity" and delivered two courses of lectures – "Basic Concepts of Faith" and "The History of Iconography" in a Sunday school for both children and adults at Grebenstchikov.

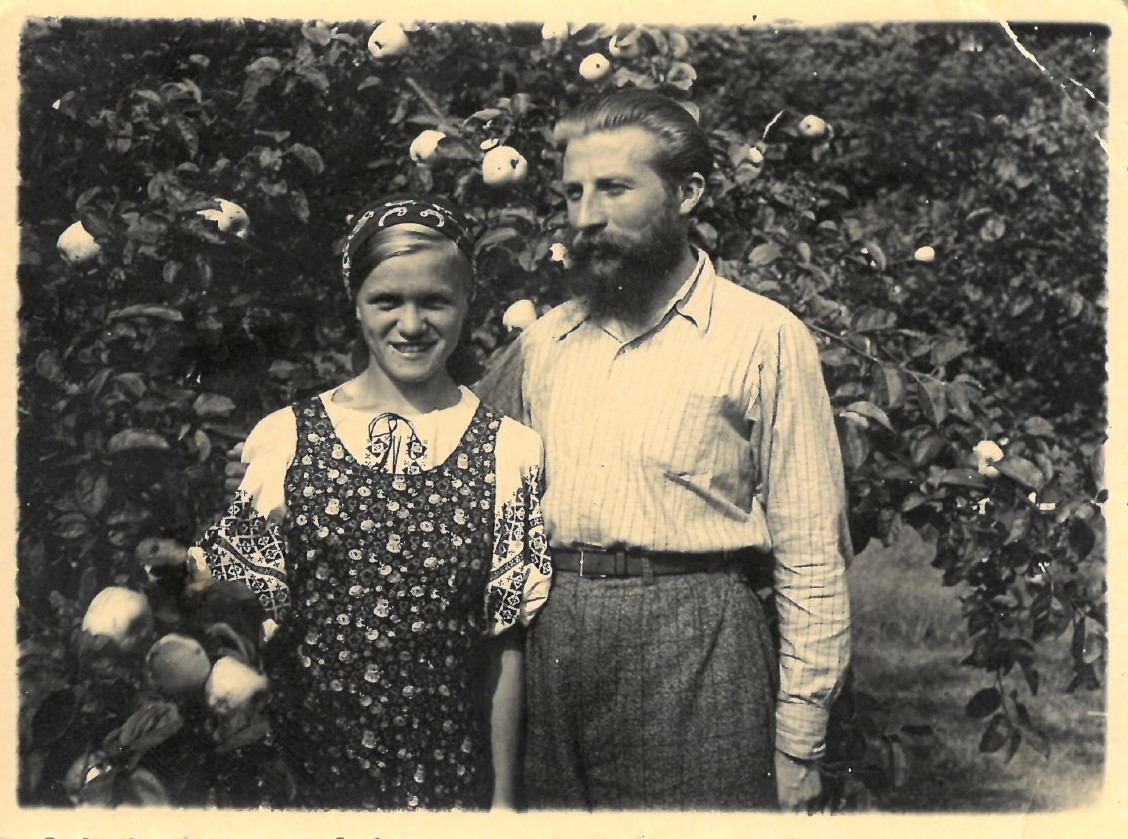
Konstantin with his beloved wife Ludmila, 1937-1938

== Marriage and children ==
In September 1938, Pavlov married Ludmila Trifonova (1920, Riga, Latvia - 1988, Plainfield, New Jersey), the youngest daughter of a well-known wealthy Riga landlord and former chairman of the Grebenstchikov House of Prayer Council, Ananij Yerofeyevich Trifonov (1851–1937) (Russian: Ананий Ерофеевич Трифонов).

The couple had two sons: Daniel Carl Pavlov (Russian: Даниил Константинович Павлов) (December 16, 1940, Riga, Latvia - November 10, 2010, New Paris, Pennsylvania) and Vladimir Pavlov (1943, Riga, Latvia - 1950, Augsburg, Germany)

Soviet and Nazi occupations separated the family forever; Ludmila, along with her two young sons, her mother Anna Leontjevna Paija (née Terentjeva) (1895, Riga, Russian Empire - 1962, Plainfield, New Jersey, Hollywood Cemetery) and her stepfather, Voldemars Paija (1889 - 1976, Plainfield, New Jersey) fled to Germany in 1943 before the second Soviet occupation of Latvia. After the death of her younger son Vladimir, on January 20, 1950, in Augsburg, the family boarded the transport ship USS General R.M. Blatchford on October 13, 1950, and arrived at Ellis Island, New York, on October 24, 1950. Ludmila and Daniel later arrived at the train station in Summit, New Jersey, where they were welcomed and assisted by a group of volunteers from the Daughters of the American Revolution.

== Life after war 1943 - 1976 ==
To avoid being drafted into the Latvian legion, Pavlov worked as a draftsman at the railway administration. However, this did not help. He could not escape conscription. After Germany's surrender, the Soviet authorities exiled Pavlov to the Vorkuta Gulag. Fortunately, his medical knowledge proved useful, and he was able to become a feldsher (medical assistant) in the camp. Having practically never fought against the Soviets and never held a weapon, he was soon released in 1947.

Pavlov returned to his native Grebenstchikov community, deeply troubled by the lack of news from his family. He received no letters from his wife. When he asked for the return of at least one son, his wife refused, claiming he had allegedly died. He later learned that his wife and sons had permanently moved to the United States. Pavlov subsequently became lonely, paranoid, and pervaded by a sense of doom. (From the memories of Maria Timofeevna Yanson (Emelyanova), a member of the Riga "Circle of Devotees of Russian Antiquity" and a former classmate of Ludmila Trifonova at the Lomonosov Gymnasium).

In 1950, Pavlov returned to the Grebenstchikov community as a canonarch. He did not abandon icon painting but painted very little. In 1958, during the interior renovation of the Assumption Church of the community, Pavlov painted the image of the Lord Almighty on the ceiling of the church and the image of the Blessed Virgin Mary in the church vestibule.

In his final years, he almost stopped painting icons, possibly due to a deteriorating mental state resultant of depression.

On January 25, 1976, Pavlov died at the age of 69 in a hospital in Riga after suffering a stroke. He was survived by his brother, Mikhail; his wife, Antonina Pavlova; and his niece, Iya Asmolova. Having served at the Grebenstchikov House of Prayer for nearly 40 years, he was laid to rest at Ivanovo Cemetery in Riga, alongside the departed spiritual mentors of the Grebenstchikov community.

== Legacy ==
In 1933, Konstantin Pavlov restored icons in the church of the Voitish community (Daugavpils district).

In 1934, at the request of Luka Konstantinovich Konstantinov, he painted a processional cross for the church of the Vylcani Old Believer community (Preiļi district). According to parishioners' recollections, the acquisition of this cross became a true spiritual celebration for the local Old Believers. The cross was brought from Riga to the home of the patron in Vylcani, where the entire community first held a prayer service in honor of the Holy Cross. Then, in a solemn procession, they carried it to the church, where it was installed.

In 1935–36, he painted the iconostasis for the newly built Old Believer The Church of the Dormition of the Blessed Virgin Mary (Uspensky Temple) in Jelgava.

In 1938, Pavlov restored icons in the Tiskadi Church, at the invitation of the council of the Tiskadi community (Rēzekne district), who had decided to restore all the icons and the iconostasis. The restoration was successfully completed at a total cost of 580 lats.

By the late 1930s, Pavlov painted the central image "King of Kings" ("Christ Enthroned with Attendants") for the Puderov Old Believer Church (Rēzekne district), as well as icons for the newly built churches of the Skangali and Kostygi communities (Preiļi district). He worked extensively in prayer houses in the Daugavpils district, including painting the Apostolic tier of icons for the Niderkuni community's church and creating icons for the Volodino community.

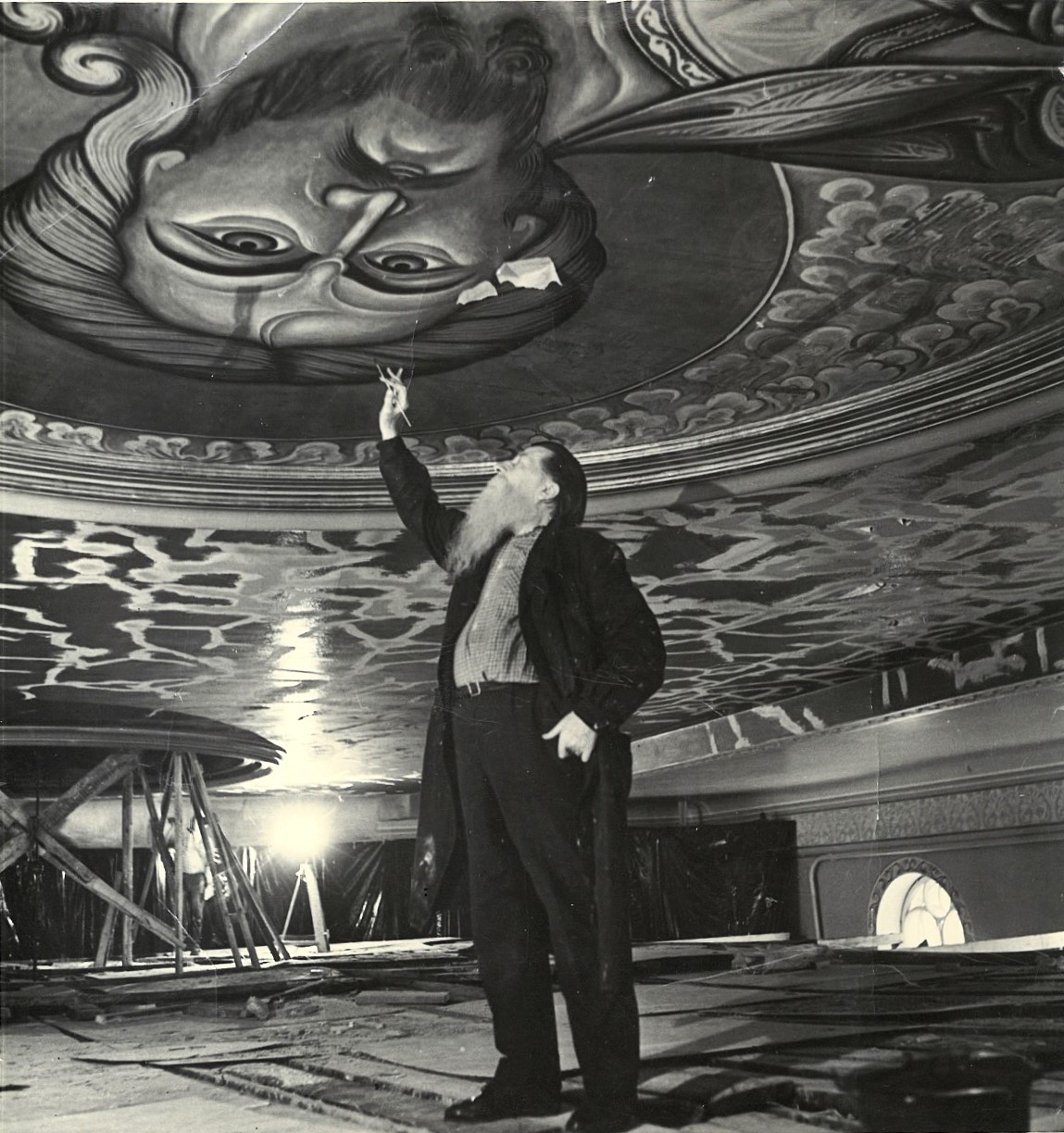
Konstantin Pavlov restores the image of Jesus Christ in 1973

In the 1950s, he resumed his iconographic work and engaged in the restoration of icons at the Grebenstchikov House of Prayer. During this time, he created several works, including the image of "St. Martyr and Archdeacon Lawrence and St. Martyr Justina" for the family of Grebenstchikov community chairman and mentor Lavrenty Mikhailov, as well as the image of "Venerable Macarius of Zheltovodsk and Unzha, the Miracle Worker", featuring a finely detailed depiction of the monastery, among other works.

In the late 1950s, Pavlov painted a series of feast-day icons for the second tier of the central iconostasis at Grebenstchikov.

In 1958, he completed a 4x4 meter dome fresco of "Christ Pantocrator (Almighty)", along with ceiling paintings for the Grebenstchikov House of Prayer. The description of "Christ Pantocrator" is best captured by the words of the Apostle Paul: "God is a consuming fire." The Lord is depicted with a stern expression, reminding Christians of Judgment Day and the Second Coming. "Christ Pantocrator" is considered Pavlov's last major work.

The icons of Pavlov are highly valued by Latvian Old Believers, but much of the iconographer's legacy has been irretrievably lost. In 1992, the church of the Voitish community burned down. The iconostasis of the Tiskadi church was completely looted.

However, preserving what remains is the duty of today's Old Believers, so that the memory of a successor to the iconographers Gavriil Frolov and Pimen Sofronov, a devoted servant of Christ's Church, is not forgotten.
