= Grebenstchikov House of Prayer, Riga =

House of prayer in Riga, Latvia

Coordinates: 56°57′N 24°06′E

Grebenstchikov House of Prayer
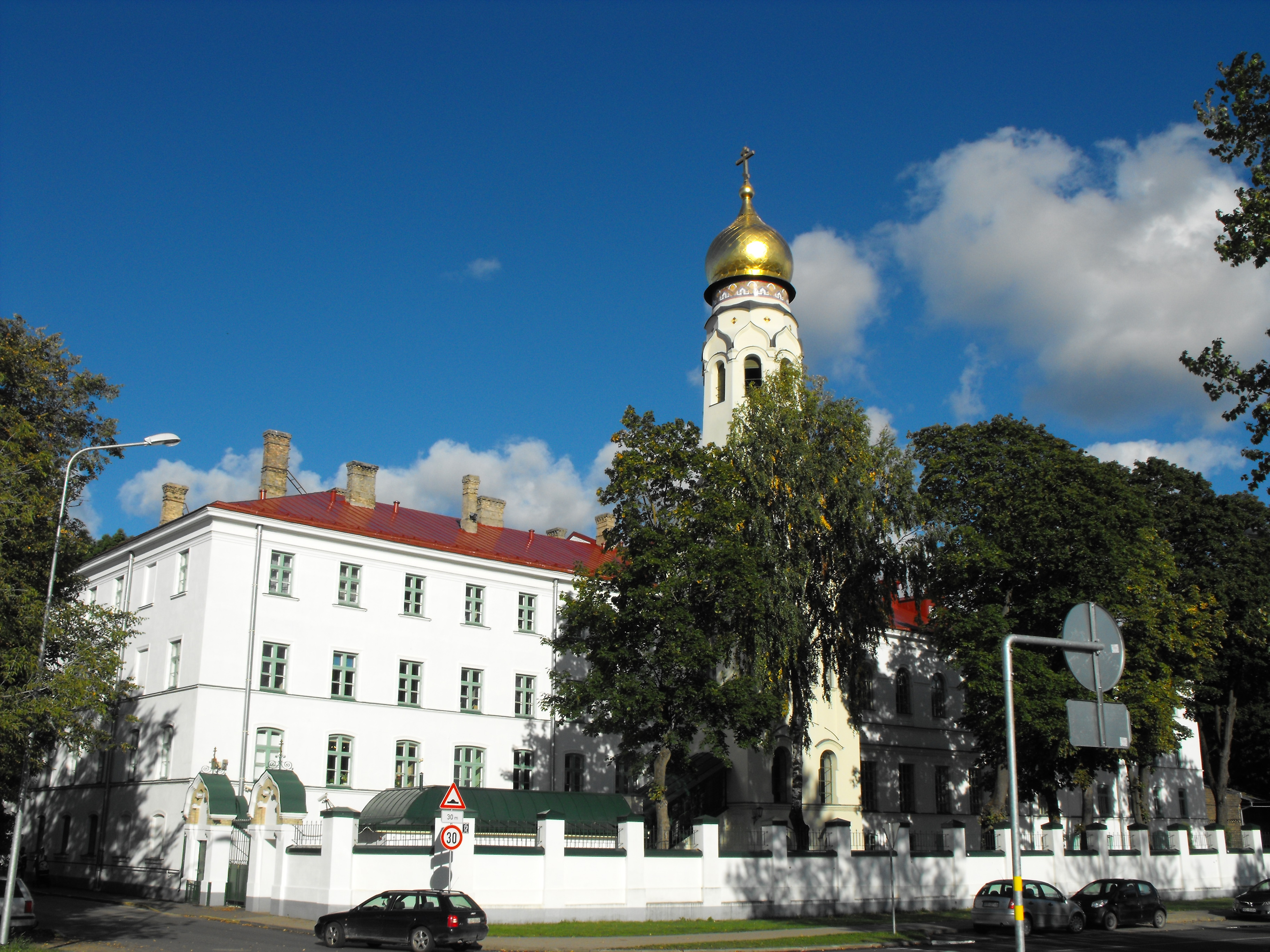
- Grebenstchikov House of Prayer and monastery

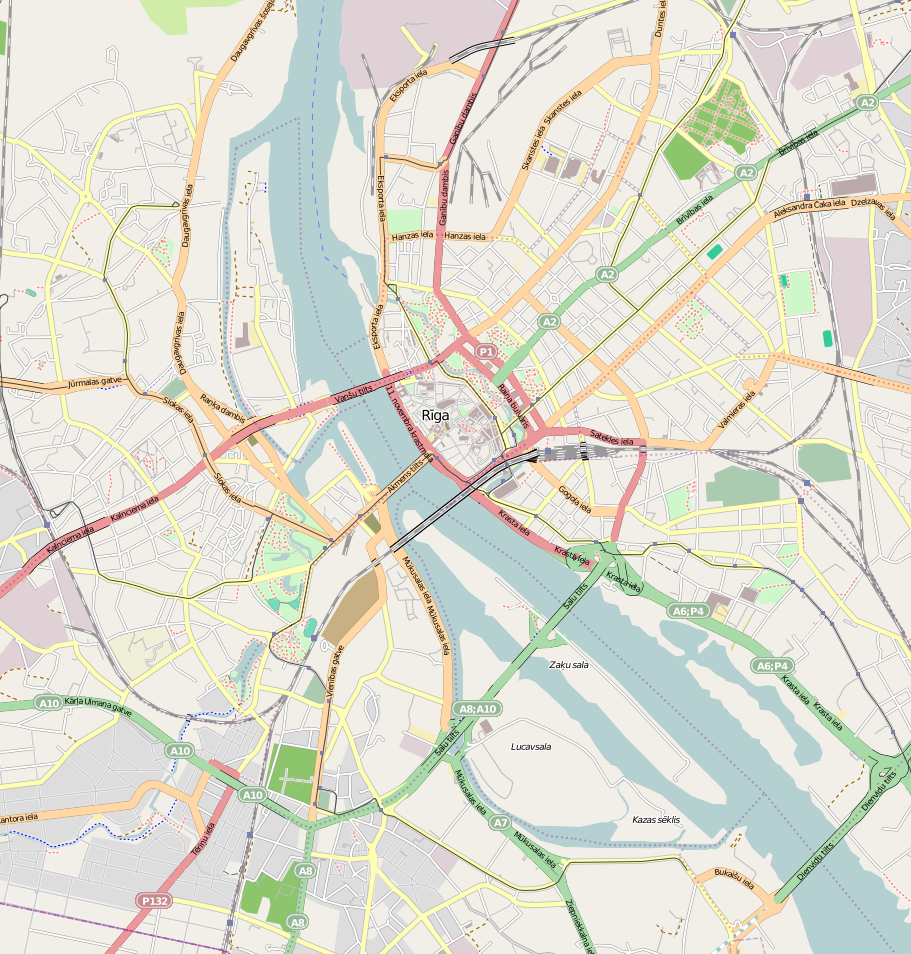
- Location within Riga
- Location: Mazā Krasta iela 73, Riga
- Country: Latvia
- Denomination: Pomorian Old-Orthodox Church

Grebenstchikov House of Prayer (Latvian: Grebenščikova vecticībnieku kopienas lūgšanu nams, Russian: Рижская Гребенщиковская соборная моленная) is an Old Believers place of worship in Riga, the capital of Latvia. It is situated at the address Mazā Krasta iela 73.

== History ==
The Grebenstchikov congregation is affiliated with the Pomorian Old-Orthodox Church, a priestless Old Believer denomination. The congregation, established no later than 1760, is considered the oldest extant Old Believer congregation in the world. With an estimated 25,000 worshipers, the parish is considered as the world's largest.
