= Shabjdeed =

Palestinian rapper (born 1995)

Shabjdeed شب جديد
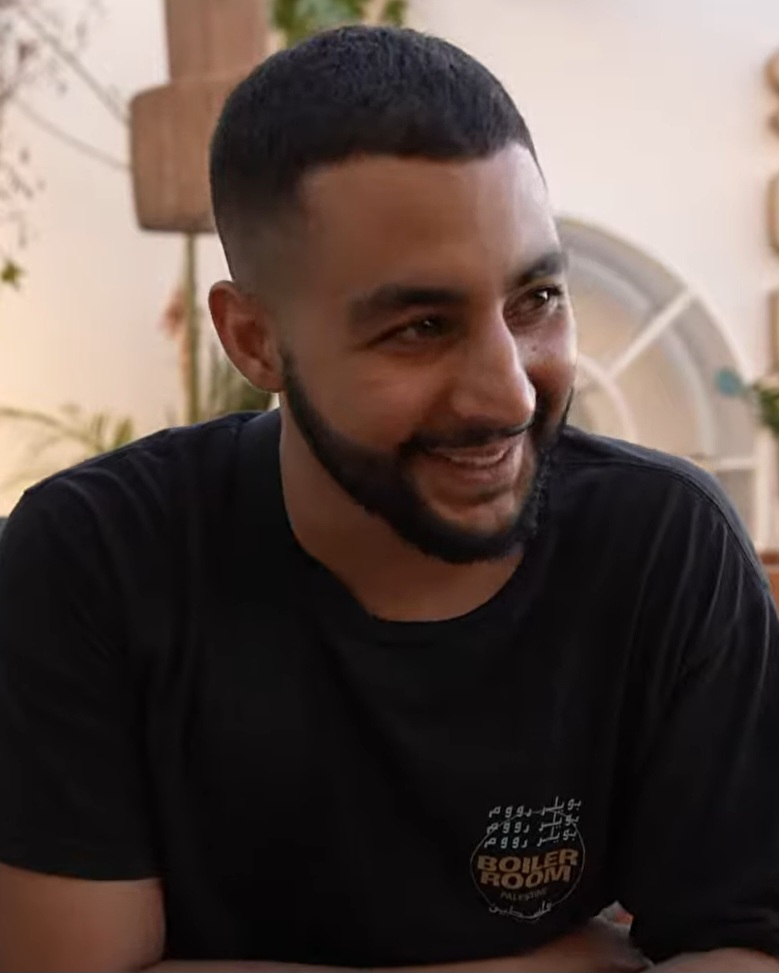
- Shabjdeed in 2023

Background information
- Born: Oday Abbas; 1995 (age 30–31); Kafr 'Aqab, Jerusalem, Palestine
- Origin: Ramallah, Palestine
- Genre: Palestinian hip-hop
- Occupation: Rapper
- Years active: 2017–present

Oday Abbas (Arabic: عدي عباس; born 1995), better known by his stage name Shabjdeed (Levantine Arabic: شب جديد or شبجديد, lit. 'New Guy'), is a Palestinian rapper from Kafr 'Aqab, Jerusalem. Based in the city of Ramallah, he has become an influential figure in underground Palestinian hip-hop.

== Style ==
Shabjdeed's lyrics are mainly inspired by the daily life of a Palestinian in the West Bank, especially of his generation, growing up after, and not during, the Nakba, the Naksa, as well as the First and Second Intifada. The Palestinian struggle and life under occupation are rarely discussed in his lyrics, much more just referenced as a part of daily life. His use of the Arabic language is characterized as playful, using alliteration and rhyming to create a unique style. His delivery has been described as a "constant overflow of words that fills every corner of a track." Shabjdeed's rapping has been distinguished by his thick accent. He cites the Ramallah rap collective Saleb Wahed as a major source of inspiration.

== BLTNM ==
Along with Al Nather and Ahmad Zaghmouri (Shabmouri), he is a part of BLTNM – pronounced "blatnum", in reference to Dubai-based Platinum Records and the fact that Arabic has no /p/ phoneme distinct from /b/, with /p/ being usually represented by the ب character in loanwords. The group participated in a campaign for Burberry in August 2020.

The critic Ma'an Abu Taleb named Shabjdeed and Al Nather's 2019 track "Mtaktak" for a list of the "greatest hip-hop songs of all time" published by the BBC.

== Controversy ==
On 1 August 2026, Shabjdeed released "SLV", a diss track directed at fellow Palestinian rapper Saint Levant, criticizing his mainstream commercial success and accusing him of commodifying the Palestinian cause and using it as a mere aesthetic to light-themed works in order to appeal to Western audiences. The song sparked a debate over Palestinian representation amid the Gaza genocide, and has brought up the question of the national identity of a people with different lived experiences in different parts of Palestine and the diaspora.

== Discography ==
=== Studio albums ===
- Carlo (2017)
- Hmlana (2018)
- Jdeed Vol.1 (2018)
- Jdeed Vol.2 (2018)
- Jdeed Vol.3 (2018)
- Adina (2019)
- Sindibad al Ward (2019)
- Sultan (2024)
