= The Voice of Mongolia season 2 =

The Voice of Mongolia
- Season 2
- Hosted by: Uuganbayar Enkhbat; Ankhbayar Ganbold
- Coaches: Otgonbayar Damba; Bold Dorjsuren; Ulambayar Davaa; Ononbat Sed
- Winner: Yadam.Kh
- Winning coach: Bold
- Runner-up: Oyu.B

Release
- Original network: Mongol HDTV
- Original release: January 19 – June 14, 2020

Season chronology
- ← Previous; Season 1

The second season of the Mongolian reality talent show The Voice of Mongolia premiered on Mongol TV on January 19, 2020, but the first episode's first half premiered on December 31, 2019 as New Year's Eve gift. The first promo campaign aired on Mongol HDTV and their social media pages during summer.

All four coaches return for their second season. The season had a new "steal" button on the Battles Round, informing each coach had to steal two contestants who just lost at the Battles stage. Then the season expanded from the first season, each coach has ten artists on their team during the Knockouts, rather than eight as in the first season. Meanwhile, Ankhbayar and Uuganbayar returned for their second season as hosts.

== Coaches & hosts ==
In October 2019, it was announced that all four of the original coaches returned for this season. Uuganbayar & Ankhbayar, the hosts of the show, also returned. Celebrity guest mentors also worked with coaches during the battle rounds. In Knockout round, Sarantuya, Ganbayar, Enkhmanlai are mentors for TeamOtgoo, Namuun, Naagii are mentors for TeamUka, Camerton is mentor for TeamBold which is his bandmates, Batchuluun is mentor for TeamOnonbat.

== Teams ==
- Winner
- Runner-up
- Third/Fourth place
- Eliminated in the Semi Finals
- Eliminated in the Quarter Finals
- Eliminated in The Knockouts
- Stolen in the Battle rounds
- Eliminated in the Battle rounds
- Withdrew

Coaches	Top 65 artists			
Otgoo				
Otgoo	Oyu.B	Gan-Erdene.E	Enkh-Inguun.A	Margad-Erdene.L
Otgoo	Erkhembayar.E	Mungunshur.D	Munkhbayar.G	Bat-Od.D
Otgoo	Uurtsaikh.E	Dashchanrav.G	~~Dashnyam.E~~	~~Bat-Erdene.O~~
Otgoo	~~Aysaule.D~~	~~Dulguun.G~~	Enkhbolor.S	Odkhuu.N
Otgoo	Chinsanaa.A	Erdenebayar.Ch		
Bold				
Bold	Yadam.Kh	Anujin.B	Alungoo.B	Enerelsaikhan.N; Saruultuya.G
Bold	Dulguun.G	Munkhshagai.G	Serchmaa.D	Azzorig.U
Bold	Batzorig.M	Anu.B	~~Saranmaral.M~~	Nyamkhishig.G
Bold	Baasanjargal.J	Erdenezaya.O	Minjin.U	Tuvshintur.Kh
Bold	Urtnasan.U			
Uka				
Uka	Dashnyam.E	Maral-Od.S	Bat-Erdene.O	Urlug.T
Uka	Ochirkhuu.B	Khaliunaa.D	Khishigduuren.G	"Bilguun.B
Uka	"Serjmyadag.L	"Odbayar.G	~~Serchmaa.D~~	~~Enkh-Inguun.A~~
Uka	Bat-Ireedui.B	Khongorzul.B	Khaliun.B	Uryn.N
Uka	Gantulga.D	Zol.Z	Tsend.B	
Ononbat				
Ononbat	Ermuun.G	Tsolmon.D	Dorjpagma.B	Binderiya.B
Ononbat	Altanzul.U	Baatar.B	Azbayar.O	Anudari.E
Ononbat	Saranmaral.M	~~Erkhembayar.E~~	Binderiya.B	Enkhtulga.B
Ononbat	Enkhjin.G	Byambazolboo.Z	Zolzaya.B	Odonchimeg.J
Ononbat	Aysaule.D	Badamkhand.Ch		
Note: Italicized names are stolen artists (names struck through within former teams).

== Blind auditions ==
✔	Coach Pressed "I Want You" Button
	Artist Defaulted to a Coach's Team
	Artist Elected a Coach's Team
	Artist was Eliminated

=== Episode 1 (January 19) ===
The first Blind Audition taped episode was broadcast on January 19, 2020. But episode 1's first half, first premiered on December 31, 2019. The coaches performed The Beatles song, "Hey Jude" at the start of the show.

Order	Artist	Song	Coach's and contestant's choices			
Order	Artist	Song	Otgoo	Bold	Uka	Ononbat
1	Badamkhand.Ch	"Sodura"	✔	✔	✔	✔
2	Alexandra.K	"Rise"	—	—	—	—
3	Tuvshintur.Kh	"Amidral"	—	✔	—	—
4	Nyamkhishig.G	"What About Us"	—	✔	—	✔
5	Dulguun.B	"Angels"	—	—	—	—
6	Mungunshur.D	"Take Me to Church"	✔	—	—	✔
7	Bayarmaa.M	"Zamd Gariya"	—	—	—	—
8	Serchmaa.D	"Habits (Stay High)"	—	—	✔	—
9	Enerelsaikhan.N	"Without Me"	—	✔	—	✔
10	Bat-Ireedui.B	"Let Me Love You"	—	—	✔	—
11	Binderiya.B	"How Deep Is Your Love"	—	✔	✔	✔
12	Bat-Od.D	"Iron Sky"	✔	✔	✔	✔

=== Episode 2 (January 26) ===
Order	Artist	Song	Coach's and contestant's choices			
Order	Artist	Song	Otgoo	Bold	Uka	Ononbat
1	Dashnyam.G	"Busgui"	✔	—	—	—
2	Khongorzul.B	"Cry Baby"	—	—	✔	—
3	Altanzul.U	"Sehuun Salhi"	✔	✔	✔	✔
4	Dulguunnaran.N	"Across the Universe"	—	—	—	—
5	Baasanjargal.J	"Rise Up"	—	✔	—	—
6	Azbayar.O	"People Help the People"	—	✔	—	✔
7	Odbayar.G	"Manan"	—	—	✔	—
8	Otgondorj.E	"As You Are"	—	—	—	—
9	Batjargal.E	"Uchraliin Egshig"	—	—	—	—
10	Manduul.B	"The Reason"	—	—	—	—
11	Bat-Erdene.O	"Story of My Life"	✔	—	—	—
12	Alungoo.B	"Secret Love Song"	✔	✔	✔	✔

=== Episode 3 (February 2) ===
Order	Artist	Song	Coach's and contestant's choices			
Order	Artist	Song	Otgoo	Bold	Uka	Ononbat
1	Amindavaa.O	"Chasing Cars"	—	—	—	—
2	Anudari.B	"Paradise City"	—	—	—	—
3	Chinsanaa.A	"Work from Home"	✔	—	—	—
4	Binderiya.B	"Tsenher Zurh"	—	—	✔	✔
5	Mandukhai.N	"100%"	—	—	—	—
6	Azzorig.U	"Ulaanbaatariin Agaar"	—	✔	—	✔
7	Uryn.N	"Mad About You"	—	—	✔	✔
8	Khosbayar.E	"Star"	—	—	—	✔
9	Khaliun.B	"Super Bass"	—	✔	—	—
10	Bibish.G	"Nandin Shuteen"	—	—	—	—
11	Munkhshagai.G	"Zuulun"	✔	✔	—	—
12	Ermuun.G	"To The Moon & Back"	✔	✔	✔	✔
13	Dashchanrav.G	"We Are The Champions"	✔	✔	✔	✔

== The battles ==
After the Blind Auditions, each coach had sixteen or seventeen contestants for the Battle rounds, which aired from March 22 to April 12, 2020. Each episode featured eight battles consisting of pairings from within one team, and each battle concluding with the respective coach eliminating one of the two or three contestants; the eight winners for each coach advanced to the next round. In this season, the new "steal" button introduced, leading each coach had to steal two contestants from the other 3 teams, who just lost their respective battles.

Color key:

Artist won the Battle and advanced to the Knockouts
Artist lost the Battle but was stolen by another coach and advanced to the Knockouts
Artist lost the Battle and was eliminated
Artist voluntarily left the competition

Episode	Coach	Order	Winner	Song	Loser	"Steal" result			
Episode	Coach	Order	Winner	Song	Loser	Otgoo	Bold	Uka	Ononbat
Episode 11 (Sunday, March 22, 2020)	Uka	1	Ochirkhuu	"Like to Be You"	Serchmaa	—	✔	N/A	—
Episode 11 (Sunday, March 22, 2020)	Uka	2	Bilguun	"Garaad Ir"	Zol	—	—	N/A	—
Episode 11 (Sunday, March 22, 2020)	Uka	3	Khaliunaa	"Durlal Namaig"	Gantulga	—	—	N/A	—
Episode 11 (Sunday, March 22, 2020)	Uka	4	Maral-Od	"Old Town Road"	Khaliun	—	—	N/A	—
Episode 11 (Sunday, March 22, 2020)	Uka	4	Maral-Od	"Old Town Road"	Bat-Ireedui	—	—	N/A	—
Episode 11 (Sunday, March 22, 2020)	Uka	5	Khishigduuren	"Dear Mama" "Ijii Setgel"	Tsend	—	—	N/A	—
Episode 11 (Sunday, March 22, 2020)	Uka	6	Odbayar	"Don't Dream It's Over"	Uryn	—	—	N/A	—
Episode 11 (Sunday, March 22, 2020)	Uka	7	Urlug	"My Mind"	Khongorzul	—	—	N/A	—
Episode 11 (Sunday, March 22, 2020)	Uka	8	Serjmyadag	"Lost Without You"	Enkh-Inguun	✔	—	N/A	—
Episode 12 (Sunday, March 29, 2020)	Otgoo	1	Bat-Od	"Whatever It Takes"	Chinsanaa	N/A	—	—	—
Episode 12 (Sunday, March 29, 2020)	Otgoo	2	Margad-Erdene	"7 Seconds"	Odkhuu	N/A	—	—	—
Episode 12 (Sunday, March 29, 2020)	Otgoo	3	Mungunshur	"Dusk Till Dawn"	Enkhbolor	N/A	—	—	—
Episode 12 (Sunday, March 29, 2020)	Otgoo	4	Munkhbayar	"Bi Gertee"	Bat-Erdene	N/A	—	✔	—
Episode 12 (Sunday, March 29, 2020)	Otgoo	5	Gan-Erdene	"Fire"	Aysaule	N/A	✔	—	✔
Episode 12 (Sunday, March 29, 2020)	Otgoo	6	Uurtsaikh	"Everlong"	Dulguun	N/A	✔	—	—
Episode 12 (Sunday, March 29, 2020)	Otgoo	7	Oyu	"Shallow"	Erdenebayar	N/A	Team full	—	—
Episode 12 (Sunday, March 29, 2020)	Otgoo	8	Dashchanrav	"Unu Munh Oron"	Dashnyam	N/A	Team full	✔	—
Episode 13 (Sunday, April 5, 2020)	Ononbat	1	Tsolmon	"Love on the Brain"	Byambazolboo	—	Team full	Team full	N/A
Episode 13 (Sunday, April 5, 2020)	Ononbat	2	Baatar	"Forever Young"	Binderiya	—	Team full	Team full	N/A
Episode 13 (Sunday, April 5, 2020)	Ononbat	3	—	"Haluun Setgel"	Odonchimeg^{1}	—	Team full	Team full	N/A
Episode 13 (Sunday, April 5, 2020)	Ononbat	3	—	"Haluun Setgel"	Badamkhand^{1}	N/A	Team full	Team full	N/A
Episode 13 (Sunday, April 5, 2020)	Ononbat	4	Altanzul^{1}	"Just Give Me a Reason"	—	N/A	Team full	Team full	N/A
Episode 13 (Sunday, April 5, 2020)	Ononbat	4	Azbayar^{1}	"Just Give Me a Reason"	—	N/A	Team full	Team full	N/A
Episode 13 (Sunday, April 5, 2020)	Ononbat	5	Dorjpagma	"Woman in Chains"	Enkhtulga	—	Team full	Team full	N/A
Episode 13 (Sunday, April 5, 2020)	Ononbat	6	Anudari	"I Try"	Enkhjin	—	Team full	Team full	N/A
Episode 13 (Sunday, April 5, 2020)	Ononbat	7	Binderiya	"Haruusliin Ayz"	Zolzaya	—	Team full	Team full	N/A
Episode 13 (Sunday, April 5, 2020)	Ononbat	8	Enguun	"Killa On The Run"	Erkhembayar	✔	Team full	Team full	N/A
Episode 14 (Sunday, April 12, 2020)	Bold	1	Anujin	"Lovely"	Erdenezaya	Team full	Team full	Team full	—
Episode 14 (Sunday, April 12, 2020)	Bold	2	Anu	"Blank Space"	Minjin	Team full	Team full	Team full	—
Episode 14 (Sunday, April 12, 2020)	Bold	3	Batzorig	"Make It Rain"	Urtnasan	Team full	Team full	Team full	—
Episode 14 (Sunday, April 12, 2020)	Bold	4	Munkhshagai	"Photograph"	Baasanjargal	Team full	Team full	Team full	—
Episode 14 (Sunday, April 12, 2020)	Bold	5	Azzorig	"Amidraliin Togloom"	Saranmaral	Team full	Team full	Team full	✔
Episode 14 (Sunday, April 12, 2020)	Bold	6	Alungoo	"Señorita"	Nyamkhishig	Team full	Team full	Team full	Team full
Episode 14 (Sunday, April 12, 2020)	Bold	7	Yadam	"Ergeh Durvun Uliral"	Tuvshintur	Team full	Team full	Team full	Team full
Episode 14 (Sunday, April 12, 2020)	Bold	8	Enerelsaikhan^{2}	"Kill This Love"	—	Team full	Team full	Team full	Team full
Episode 14 (Sunday, April 12, 2020)	Bold	8	Saruultuya^{2}	"Kill This Love"	—	Team full	Team full	Team full	Team full
Episode 15 (Sunday, April 19, 2020)	The eleventh episode was a special recap episode titled "The Best of the Battles". It featured some of the best moments from the battles, recaps, and other unseen content.								

1. Odonchimeg was paired with Badamkhand for the battles, but for personal reasons, Badamkhand withdrew. Therefore, Odonchimeg performed alone and for the results, she battled with Altanzul and Azbayar, and she lost and left the competition. Meanwhile, Altanzul and Azbayar performed their duet together and both won against Odonchimeg.
1. Enerelsaikhan and Saruultuya performed their duet together and their coach Bold asked them if they wanted to compete for the show as a band. They both agreed to the offer and continued the show as a band since the battles.

== The knockouts ==
After The Battles, the top 40 contestants competed in The Knockouts. In one day, one team's selected 5 contestants (out of 10) competed against each other by singing a song on each of their own. When they all sang their songs, the coach had to choose 1 contestant, and the chosen contestant automatically advanced to The Quarter Finals. After that, the public voted for the remaining 4 contestants and the only one most-voted-contestant continued the show to The Quarter Finals. Each coach had 4 contestants in The Quarter Finals.

=== Team Otgoo Pt. 1 (April 26) ===
Episode	Coach	Order	Artist	Song	Result
Episode 16 (April 26)	Otgoo	1	Dashchanrav	"Smells Like Teen Spirit"	Eliminated
Episode 16 (April 26)	Otgoo	2	Enkh-Inguun	"Feel It Still"	Public's Vote
Episode 16 (April 26)	Otgoo	3	Bat-Od	"I Don't Want to Change You"	Eliminated
Episode 16 (April 26)	Otgoo	4	Uurtsaikh	"Mercedes Benz"	Eliminated
Episode 16 (April 26)	Otgoo	5	Oyu	"Radioactive"	Otgoo's Choice

Non-competition performances
Order	Performer(s)	Song
16.1	Serchmaa, Otgonbayar	"Khaa Ch Tsug"
16.2	Swing Round	"Yagaan Gerel"

=== Team Uka Pt. 1 (May 3) ===
Episode	Coach	Order	Artist	Song	Result
Episode 17 (May 3)	Uka	1	Bilguun	"Talarkhal"	Eliminated
Episode 17 (May 3)	Uka	2	Odbayar	"I'll Never Love Again"	Eliminated
Episode 17 (May 3)	Uka	3	Serjmyadag	"Don't Leave Me Lonely"	Eliminated
Episode 17 (May 3)	Uka	4	Maral-Od	"Chinii Khusel"	Uka's Choice
Episode 17 (May 3)	Uka	5	Dashnyam	"Ner Ugui Salkhi, Gavalmaa"	Public's Vote

Non-competition performances
Order	Performer(s)	Song
17.1	Uka	"DO IT"
17.2	AM-C	"Sanasan Baina"

=== Team Bold Pt. 1 (May 9) ===
Starting with this episode, show will air every weekends, despite being only air on Sunday.

Episode	Coach	Order	Artist	Song	Result
Episode 18 (May 9)	Bold	1	Anujin	"Gasoline"	Bold's Choice
Episode 18 (May 9)	Bold	2	Anu	"Yag Odoo"	Eliminated
Episode 18 (May 9)	Bold	3	Batzorig	"Sex Bomb"	Eliminated
Episode 18 (May 9)	Bold	4	Alungoo	"One More Light"	Public's Vote
Episode 18 (May 9)	Bold	5	Azzorig	"California Love"	Eliminated

Non-competition performances
Order	Performer(s)	Song
18.1	Bold feat. Vandebo	"Chamd Sonsogdoj Baina Uu?"
18.2	Ariunjargal	"Tal Nutgiin Okhin"

=== Team Ononbat Pt. 1 (May 10) ===
Episode	Coach	Order	Artist	Song	Result
Episode 19 (May 9)	Ononbat	1	Anudari	"Fallin'"	Eliminated
Episode 19 (May 9)	Ononbat	2	Saranmaral	"Black Magic"	Eliminated
Episode 19 (May 9)	Ononbat	3	Binderya	"Paper Hearts"	Public's Vote
Episode 19 (May 9)	Ononbat	4	Tsolmon	"Bird Set Free"	Ononbat's Choice
Episode 19 (May 9)	Ononbat	5	Azbayar	"Khusliin Khyazgaar"	Eliminated

Non-competition performances
Order	Performer(s)	Song
19.1	Ashid.N	"Enkh Ugluu"
19.2	Bayartsetseg.B	"Namaig Zur"

=== Team Otgoo Pt. 2 (May 16) ===
Episode	Coach	Order	Artist	Song	Result
Episode 20 (May 16)	Otgoo	1	Erkhembayar	"Never Comin' Down"	Eliminated
Episode 20 (May 16)	Otgoo	2	Margad-Erdene	"Be the One"	Otgoo's Choice
Episode 20 (May 16)	Otgoo	3	Mungunshur	"Durlald Bitgii Yar"	Eliminated
Episode 20 (May 16)	Otgoo	4	Gan-Erdene	"Somebody Told Me"	Public's Vote
Episode 20 (May 16)	Otgoo	5	Munkhbayar	"Earth Song"	Eliminated

Non-competition performances
Order	Performer(s)	Song
20.1	Otgonjargal, Otgonbayar	"Khair Mini"
20.2	The City	"Khairlaj Bolokh Uu?"

=== Team Uka Pt. 2 (May 17) ===
Episode	Coach	Order	Artist	Song	Result
Episode 21 (May 17)	Uka	1	Ochirkhuu	"As Long as You Love Me"	Eliminated
Episode 21 (May 17)	Uka	2	Khaliunaa	"Jerome"	Eliminated
Episode 21 (May 17)	Uka	3	Khishigduuren	"What You Don't Do"	Eliminated
Episode 21 (May 17)	Uka	4	Bat-Erdene	"Khotiin Khusel"	Public's Vote
Episode 21 (May 17)	Uka	5	Urlug	"Bourbon"	Uka's Choice

Non-competition performances
Order	Performer(s)	Song
21.1	Angirmaa	"Iveegeech Namaig"
21.2	Magnolian	"Caroline"

=== Team Bold Pt. 2 (May 23) ===
Episode	Coach	Order	Artist	Song	Result
Episode 22 (May 23)	Bold	1	Serchmaa	"Dance Monkey"	Eliminated
Episode 22 (May 23)	Bold	2	Munkhshagai	"Memories"	Eliminated
Episode 22 (May 23)	Bold	3	Dulguun	"Ironic"	Eliminated
Episode 22 (May 23)	Bold	4	Enerelsaikhan, Saruultuya	"Power"	Public's Vote
Episode 22 (May 23)	Bold	5	Yadam	"Physical"	Bold's Choice

Non-competition performances
Order	Performer(s)	Song
21.1	3 Okhin	"Okhin Tenger"
21.2	Naki, Zamilan	"Ireeduig Ungulnu"

=== Team Ononbat Pt. 1 (May 24) ===
Episode	Coach	Order	Artist	Song	Result
Episode 22^{3} (May 25)	Ononbat	1	Baatar	"High Hopes"	Eliminated
Episode 22^{3} (May 25)	Ononbat	2	Dorjpagma	"A Woman's Worth"	Public's Vote
Episode 22^{3} (May 25)	Ononbat	3	Altanzul	"Firework"	Eliminated
Episode 22^{3} (May 25)	Ononbat	4	Ermuun	"Dangerously"	Ononbat's Choice

Non-competition performances
Order	Performer(s)	Song
22.1	A Sound	"Crying"
22.2	Thunder, Khishigdalai	"Gantskhan Shaltgaan"

1. Aysaule who was stolen from Team Otgoo by Ononbat, but for personal reasons, Aysaule left the show during the rehearsal of Knockout.

== Quarter-finals (Mongolian songs) ==
The quarter-finals aired from May 30 to the 31st. Each coach had 4 contestants on their team. In the quarter-finals, the remaining 16 contestants sang only Mongolian songs, respectively. Two teams' contestants performed in one day. After the first team's performances, the public vote remains 4 contestants. The most voted contestant advanced to the next round. After that, the coach had to choose only one contestant, who advanced to the next round.

Color key:

Artist was Saved by the Public's Votes
Artist was Saved by the Coach
Artist was eliminated

=== Team Uka & Team Ononbat ===
Episode	Coach	Order	Artist	Song	Result
Episode 23 (May 30)	Uka	1	Bat-Erdene	"Chamaig Zorino"	Eliminated
Episode 23 (May 30)	Uka	2	Urlug	"Tsenkher Sarnii Tuya"	Eliminated
Episode 23 (May 30)	Uka	3	Dashnyam	"Nariig Khairla"	Public's Vote
Episode 23 (May 30)	Uka	4	Maral-Od	"Hi Ladies"	Uka's Choice
Episode 23 (May 30)	Ononbat	5	Binderya	"Gantskhan Chamaar"	Eliminated
Episode 23 (May 30)	Ononbat	6	Dorjpagma	"Usnii Tungalag Tamiriin Gol"	Eliminated
Episode 23 (May 30)	Ononbat	7	Ermuun	"Giiguuleech"	Ononbat's Choice
Episode 23 (May 30)	Ononbat	8	Tsolmon	"Manan"	Public's Vote

Non-competition performances
Order	Performer(s)	Song
23.1	Kiwi	"Araas Chin Tevrelgui Yvuullaa"
23.2	Solongo (with Ashid and Munkh-Erdene)	"Nutgiin Salkhi"

=== Team Otgoo & Team Bold ===
Episode	Coach	Order	Artist	Song	Result
Episode 24 (May 31)	Otgoo	1	Margad-Erdene	"Tsakhilbaa"	Eliminated
Episode 24 (May 31)	Otgoo	2	Oyu	"Butsaaj Nekhekhgui Khair"	Public's Vote
Episode 24 (May 31)	Otgoo	3	Enkh-Inguun	Goy Te"	Eliminated
Episode 24 (May 31)	Otgoo	4	Gan-Erdene	"Durvun Uliral"	Otgoo's Choice
Episode 24 (May 31)	Bold	5	Alungoo	"Mind Oddity"	Eliminated
Episode 24 (May 31)	Bold	6	Yadam	"Nam Gum Dundaas"	Public's Vote
Episode 24 (May 31)	Bold	7	Anujin	"Khuduugiin Saikhan Tald Zorino"	Bold's Choice
Episode 24 (May 31)	Bold	8	Enerelsaikhan, Saruultuya	"Vitamin"	Eliminated

Non-competition performances
Order	Performer(s)	Song
24.1	Nomuki	"Heart Breaker"
24.2	Lumino, Maraljingoo	"Taivan"

== Semi-finals ==
The semi-finals aired on June 7. Each coach had 2 contestants in their team. In this round, the contestants sing only non-Mongolian songs, and one person can vote to only one contestants. After the first team's performances, the public voted for their favorite contestants, and the most voted contestant advanced to the finals. Each coach had 1 contestant in the finals.

Color key

Artist was Saved by the Public's Votes
Artist was eliminated

Episode	Coach	Order	Artist	Song	Result
Episode 25 (June 7)	Ononbat	1	Ermuun	Nessun Dorma	Public's Vote
Episode 25 (June 7)	Ononbat	2	Tsolmon	"Stop"	Eliminated
Episode 25 (June 7)	Uka	3	Dashnyam	All Of Me	Public's Vote
Episode 25 (June 7)	Uka	4	Maral-Od	"She's Gone"	Eliminated
Episode 25 (June 7)	Bold	5	Anujin	"I Will Always Love You"	Eliminated
Episode 25 (June 7)	Bold	6	Yadam	Always Remember Us This Way	Public's Vote
Episode 25 (June 7)	Otgoo	7	Oyu	Hotline Bling	Public's Vote
Episode 25 (June 7)	Otgoo	8	Gan-Erdene	"The Pretender"	Eliminated

Non-competition performances
Order	Performer(s)	Song
25.1	Chinbat	"Ergen Yoslokhui"
25.2	Naagii	"Itgel"
25.3	Chuluunbat	"Suulchiin Khorogdokh Gazar"

== Finals ==
Color key

- — Winner
- — Runner-up
- — Third/Fourth place

In the final rounds, (aired June 14 - last day of the season 2) each coach had 1 contestant in his/her team. Oyu from Team Otgoo, Yadam from Team Bold, Dashnyam from Team Uka, Ermuun from Team Ononbat. First, the artists performed in order, then Public's Voting system's 1st round is opening, while the artists performing with their coaches, singing only Mongolian songs. Then the most-voted 2 contestants advanced to the next voting round and singing songs that written for them. After, Public's Voting system's round 2 is opening, Public can vote only remaining 2 contestants.

Episode	Coach	Artist	Order	Solo Song	Order	Duet Song (with Coach)	1st Round Result	Order	Original Song	2nd Round Result
Episode 26 (June 14)	Uka	Dashnyam	1	"Time To Say Goodbye"	8	"Uul"	Eliminated			Third/Fourth Place
Episode 26 (June 14)	Bold	Yadam	2	"Jailhouse Rock"	5	"Martakhaasaa Umnu"	Public's Vote	9	"Changa Okhid Khezee Ch Uildaggui"	Winner
Episode 26 (June 14)	Otgonbayar	Oyu	3	"All By Myself"	6	"Khamag Mongol"	Public's Vote	10	"Gerelt Khair"	Runner-Up
Episode 26 (June 14)	Ononbat	Ermuun	4	"Wolf Totem, We Will Rock You"	5	"Blues"	Eliminated			Third/Fourth Place

Non-competition performances
Order	Performer(s)	Song
26.1	Hurd	"Nulimsaa Tevchiye"
26.2	Enguun with UB Drums	"You Are The One"
