= Mongolia's Got Talent season 2 =

Mongolia's Got Talent
- Season 2
- Hosted by: Ankhabayar; Uuganbayar
- Judges: Odon Bayarsaikhan (Rokit Bay); Chimeglkham Delgertsetseg; Sarantsetseg Chimgee; Tserendorj Chuluunbat
- Winner: Enkh-Erdene O.
- Runner-up: Shijirbat B.

Release
- Original network: Mongol HDTV
- Original release: 4 September 2016

Season chronology
- ← Previous; Season 1

The second season of the reality competition series Mongolia's Got Talent premiered in the summer of 2016 and was broadcast on September 5, 2016. The judges were Tserendorj Chuluunbat (bass guitarist from Haranga rock band), Sarantsetseg Chimgee (news commentator from Mongol TV), Chimeglkham Delgertsetseg (professional violist) and Rokit Bay (Mongolian rapper).

The season was won by country music singer Enkh-Erdene O.

== Golden Buzzer ==
The Golden Buzzer was added in the series. If the act gets buzzed, they automatically advance to the Choice Round. Five performances got it.

== Preliminary auditions ==
Auditions in front of the judges began in summer 2016 and aired on September 5, 2016. The Golden Buzzer will be buzzed by the judges if they want.

== Judge Cuts ==
Judges picked 32 from winners of the Preliminary auditions to enter the semi-finals without performing.

== Semi-finals ==
The 32 contestants that qualified from Round 2 will face each other in groups. The semi-final contains four groups and each group contains eight contestants. The contestants with the most votes automatically advance to the final round, and the 2nd and 3rd most voted contestants will picked by the Judges. The winner of the Judges Choice will qualify for the final round. If the judges choice ties the most voted one will be qualified.

Key	Buzzed	Judges' choice	Advanced to the Finale	Won the judges' choice	Lost the judges' choice	Won the peoples' choice	Lost the peoples' choice	Picked as Wild Card

=== Group 1 ===
Guest(s): Uka

Act	Order	Performance description	Judges' Choices				Result
Act	Order	Performance description	Chuka	Chimgee	Deegii	Rokit Bay	Result
Master Dance	1	Dancer, performed a 1920s style dance.					Eliminated
Dugersuren M.	2	Singer, performed a Mongolian traditional song					Eliminated
Enkhmandakh Ts. & Tuvshinsaikhan E.	3	Duo Singer, performed a Mongolian song called "Rock n Roll"					Eliminated
Munkhsaikhan Ts.	4	Stuntman, performed a stunt which he played with knives, flaming swords and broken glasses					Eliminated
Moon Dance	5	Dance Crew, performed dance moves on an ice-sheet with a remix of "Let it Go" by Idina Menzel					Eliminated
Ikhersuvd B.	6	Singer/Ukelilist, performed "Little Talks" by Of Monsters And Men					Advanced
Shijirbat B.	7	Dancer, performed a robotic dance with LED background on a remix of "Faded" by Alan Walker					Advanced
Oyuu B.	8	Singer, performed "Listen" by Beyoncé					Eliminated

=== Group 2 ===
Guest(s): TBD

Act	Order	Performance description	Judges' Choices				Result
Act	Order	Performance description	Chuka	Chimgee	Deegii	Rokit Bay	Result
Khukh Tolboton	1	Gymnasts, performed on a horizontal bar while acting as a builders					Eliminated
Jamyaansuren N.	2	Mime, performed as a silver alien and played with a balloon					Eliminated
Sion	3	Chorus, performed "Gar Utas" by Camerton					Eliminated
Linked	4	Rock Band, performed "Highway to hell" by AC/DC					Eliminated
Enkh-Erdene E.	5	Singer, performed "Ohin" by Dashdondog					Eliminated
Tungalagtamir B.	6	Singer, performed a Mongolian traditional song					Eliminated
Uugan-Erdene E.	7	Dancer, performed on lyrics of "7 Years" by Lukas Graham as a bird					Advanced
Khishigbat J.	8	Opera Singer, performed "Caruso" by Lara Fabian					Advanced

== Finale ==
The 8 winners of the semi-finals (2 each group) will compete and the people will decide the winner.

=== Final Group ===
Act	Order	Performance description	Result
Bayarmagnai P.	1	Singer, performed Mongolian national song Aylguut Nutag.	Bottom Five
Ganburged P.	2	Parody Singer performed acting as Mongolian singers such as Sarantuya, Turmandakh, Batbayr, Chimidtseye and Jargalsaikhan.	Bottom Five
Altai	3	Musical ensemble, performed an original composition with the use of traditional Mongolian musical instruments.	Bottom Five
Khishigbat J.	4	Opera Singer, performed Marriage of Figaro	Bottom Five
Ikhersuvd B.	5	Singer/Ukelelist performed "Sweet Child o' Mine" by Guns N' Roses	Bottom Five
Shijirbat B.	6	Dancer, performed a dance moves by using the sun of Mongolian Soyombo.	Runner-up
Uugan-Erdene E.	7	Dancer, performed a life of Mother by using a single towel.	Eliminated
Enkh-Erdene O.	8	Singer, performed an original with a tone of "Feeling Good" by Michael Bublé	Winner
