= The Voice of Mongolia =

Season of television series

- Genre: Talent show
- Created by: John de Mol; Roel van Velzen
- Presented by: Uuganbayar Enkhbat; Ankhbayar Ganbold
- Judges: Otgonbayar Damba; Bold Dorjsuren; Ulambayar Davaa; Ononbat Sed; Naranzun Badruugan; Big Gee; Naagii; Baachka
- Country of origin: Mongolia
- Original language: Mongolian
- No. of seasons: 4
- No. of episodes: 74

Production
- Production companies: Talpa (2018); ITV Studios (2020–present)

Original release
- Network: Mongol HDTV
- Release: January 21, 2018 – present

Related
- The Voice (franchise)

The Voice of Mongolia is a Mongolian reality talent show created by John de Mol, based on the concept The Voice of Holland and it is part of an international series. It began airing on January 21, 2018 on Mongol HDTV.

The hosts are Uuganbayar Enkhbat and Ankhbayar Ganbold. The four coaches are Otgonbayar Damba (Otgoo), Bold Dorjsuren (Bold), Ulambayar Davaa (Uka), Ononbat Sed (Ononbat). Third season introduced a new coach which is Naranzun Badruugan (Naranzun) who replaced Ononbat.

== Coaches and presenters ==
Coach	Seasons			
Coach	1	2	3	4
Ulambayar Davaa				
Otgonbayar Damba				
Bold Dorjsuren				
Ononbat Sed				
Naranzun Badruugan				
Big Gee				
Naagii				
Baachka				

Presenter	Seasons		
Presenter	1	2	3
Uuganbayar Enkhbat			
Ankhbayar Ganbold			

== Series overview ==
Colour key

Team Otgoo
Team Bold
Team Uka
Team Ononbat
Team Naranzun
Team Big Gee
Team Naagii
Team Baachka

Season	Aired	Winner	Runner-up	Other finalist(s)		Winning coach	Presenters	Coaches (chair's order)			
Season	Aired	Winner	Runner-up	Other finalist(s)		Winning coach	Presenters	1	2	3	4
1	2018	Enguun Tseyendash	Bolormaa.A	Ariunjargal.J	Usuhbayar.B	Uka Davaa	Uuganbayar Enkhbat; Ankhbayar Ganbold	Otgoо	Bold	Uka	Ononbat
2	2020	Yadam Khürelmönkh	Oyu Batsaikhan	Ermuun.G	Dashnyam Erdenee	Bold Dorjsuren	Uuganbayar Enkhbat; Ankhbayar Ganbold	Otgoо	Bold	Uka	Ononbat
3	2022	Davaadalai Gerelt-Od	Ikhersuvd Baatar	Amgalan.E	Egshiglen Gantulga	Otgonbayar Damba	Uuganbayar Enkhbat; Ankhbayar Ganbold	Otgoо	Bold	Uka	Naranzun
4	2025–2026	Amin-Erdene.E	L. Ariunjargal	Altanzul.B	Gankhulug.P	Naagii	Uuganbayar Enkhbat; Ankhbayar Ganbold	Big Gee	Naagii	Uka	Baachka

== Kids edition ==
The Voice Kids was based on the original Dutch version from The Netherlands. The series' spinoff was announced in 2023. The show premiered February 18, 2024 on Mongol TV. Uka Davaa, Naagii and ThunderZ were announced as coaches on February 8, 2024. The show is presented by Uuganbayar Enkhbat and Sansarmaa Battur.

The Voice Kids series overview
Season	Aired	Winner	Runners-up		Winning coach	Hosts	Coaches (chairs' order)		
Season	Aired	Winner	Runners-up		Winning coach	Hosts	1	2	3
1	2024	E.Chinguun	E.Amin-Erdene	S.Mongoljin	ThunderZ	U. Enkhbat S. Battur	Thunder	Uka	Naagii
