= Beck (Mongolian singer) =

Mongolian singer-songwriter

- Beck in 2026
- Born: Ganbatyn Munkhbayar
- Occupations: singer-songwriter; television presenter; economist
- Years active: 2000s–present

Ganbatyn Munkhbayar (Mongolian: Ганбатын Мөнхбаяр), known mononymously as Beck (formerly Becky), is a Mongolian singer-songwriter, television presenter and economist. He rose to prominence in the 2000s as a member of the musical group Funk Beats and later as a solo artist with his debut album B21. Since 2025, Munkhbayar has worked as a presenter and producer at CNBC Mongolia. He represented Mongolia in the Eurovision Song Contest Asia 2026 with the song "Chamguigeer (Without You)".

== Biography ==
=== Early life and education ===
He was born to Enkhbayar Choijil, a finance professor at the National University of Mongolia.

Munkhbayar earned a degree in banking economics from the School of Economics at the Mongolian University of Science and Technology.

=== 2000s: Early career and solo music ===
Munkhbayar began his musical career in the early 2000s as a member of the hip-hop and contemporary R&B collective Funk Beats, performing under the moniker Becky. After leaving the group, he pursued a solo career. In 2008, he released his debut studio album, B21.

=== 2012—2019: Musical hiatus and other ventures ===
In 2012, Munkhbayar served as executive director of Mongolia's Fashion Channel. That same year, he founded the Mongolian National Youth Association.

In the 2016 Mongolian parliamentary election, he formally ran as an independent candidate for the State Great Khural, contesting the constituency representing the Sukhbaatar District of Ulaanbaatar.

In 2019, Munkhbayar served as the general secretary of the Hollywood in Mongolia, an international festival for filmmakers.

=== 2020—present: Return to music ===
After a prolonged hiatus from active music recording, Munkhbayar made a return in 2020 by auditioning for the second season of the television singing competition The Voice of Mongolia. Auditioning under his birth name, his performance of "Run" by Snow Patrol prompted chair turns from three of the four coaches: Otgonbayar Damba, Bold Dorjsuren, and Ononbat Sed. He chose to join Team Otgoo (Otgonbayar). He advanced through the Battle rounds but was subsequently eliminated during the Knockouts stage.

The Voice of Mongolia performances and results
Round	Song	Original artist	Result
Blind Auditions	"Run"	Snow Patrol	Three-chair turn; Joined Team Otgoo
The Battles	"Bi Gertee" (Би гэртээ) (vs. Bat-Erdene)	Nomin Talst	Winner
The Knockouts	"Earth Song"	Michael Jackson	Eliminated

In 2023, Munkhbayar served as a producer and appeared in a supporting acting role for the feature film Khayr 2 (Хайр 2).

In late 2025, Munkhbayar wrote and produced the theatrical production Gaijin: Mongol Samurai. The musical premiered at the Ulaanbaatar Theatre in November 2025. In conjunction with the production, he wrote and recorded the lead soundtrack single, "Khayr gedeg" (Хайр гэдэг), a duet featuring Agiimaa, released in October 2025.

On 1 October 2026, Munkhbayar, under the stage name Beck, was announced as Mongolia's representative at the Eurovision Song Contest Asia 2026. His song, "Light", won the national selection, Mongolia's Chosen One, held on 10 October. Following the selection, it emerged that the song had previously been published online in 2018. On 17 October, the organisers ruled "Light" ineligible for violating the contest's rule prohibiting entries from being commercially promoted or publicly performed before 1 July 2026. The runner-up song, "Chamguigeer (Without You)" (Чамгүйгээр), was selected as its replacement.

== Personal life ==
Munkhbayar is married to Badamgerel Khurelbaatar, a prominent Mongolian model with whom he co-founded a modelling agency. They have a son together.

== Discography ==
=== Studio albums ===
Title
B21
Details
- Released: 2008
- Label: Independent release
- Formats: unknown
Notes
- Track listing

#	Title	Length
1.	"Intro"	1:04
2.	"Bi uilah durgui" (Би уйлах дургүй)	3:55
3.	"Hen negen" (Хэн нэгэн) (featuring Bebe)	4:39
4.	"Hairaa chamd ogoe" (Хайраа чамд өгье)	4:03
5.	"Chamdaa zoriulaya" (Чамдаа зориулъя)	4:49
6.	"My boo"	3:48
7.	"Bi chamd hairtai" (Би чамд хайртай) (featuring Zaya)	4:22
		26:57

=== Soundtracks ===
- "Khayr gedeg" (Хайр гэдэг) (with Agiimaa) (from Gaijin: Mongol Samurai) (2025)

=== Other songs ===
List of songs as lead artist, showing year released and album name
Title	Year	Album
"Chamguigeer (Without You)" (Чамгүйгээр) (Note: Traditional Mongolian script: ᠴᠢᠮᠠᠭᠦᠢᠭᠡᠷ)	2026	Eurovision Song Contest Asia 2026 (Compilation Album)

== Music videos ==
Title	Year	Director	Ref(s)
"Hairaa chamd ogoe" (Хайраа чамд өгье)	?	?	
"Hen negen" (Хэн нэгэн)	?	?	
"My boo"	?	?	
"Zowhon chamaig hairlaya" (Зөвхөн чамайг хайрлая)	2009	?	
"Hairtai baisan" (Хайртай байсан) (featuring Bebe)	?	Xac Media Entertainment	
"My Love"	2011	Xac Media Entertainment	
"Light"	2018	Xac Media Entertainment	
"Khayr gedeg" (Хайр гэдэг) (with Agiimaa)	2025	Munkhsuld.D	

== Filmography ==
=== Film ===
Year	Title	Role	Ref.
2023	Khayr 2 (Хайр 2)	Supporting actor, producer	

=== Television ===
Year	Title	Role	Notes	Ref.
2020	The Voice of Mongolia	Contestant	Season 2	
2025—present	CNBC News Program	Presenter/Producer		
2025	Happy 31	Guest	SBN's New Year's Eve show	
2026	Mongolia's Chosen One	Contestant		
2026	Eurovision Song Contest Asia 2026	Contestant		

== Theater ==
Year	Title	Role	Notes	Ref.
2025	Gaijin: Mongol Samurai	Writer/Producer	Musical drama	

== Awards and nominations ==
Award	Year	Recipient	Category	Result	Ref.
LBMA Star Awards	2019	Himself	Best Asian Singer	Won	

== Notes ==
Awards and achievements
Preceded by None	Mongolia in the Eurovision Song Contest Asia; 2026	Succeeded by TBD
