= Twinpearly =

Mongolian singer-songwriter

- Баатарын Ихэрсувд
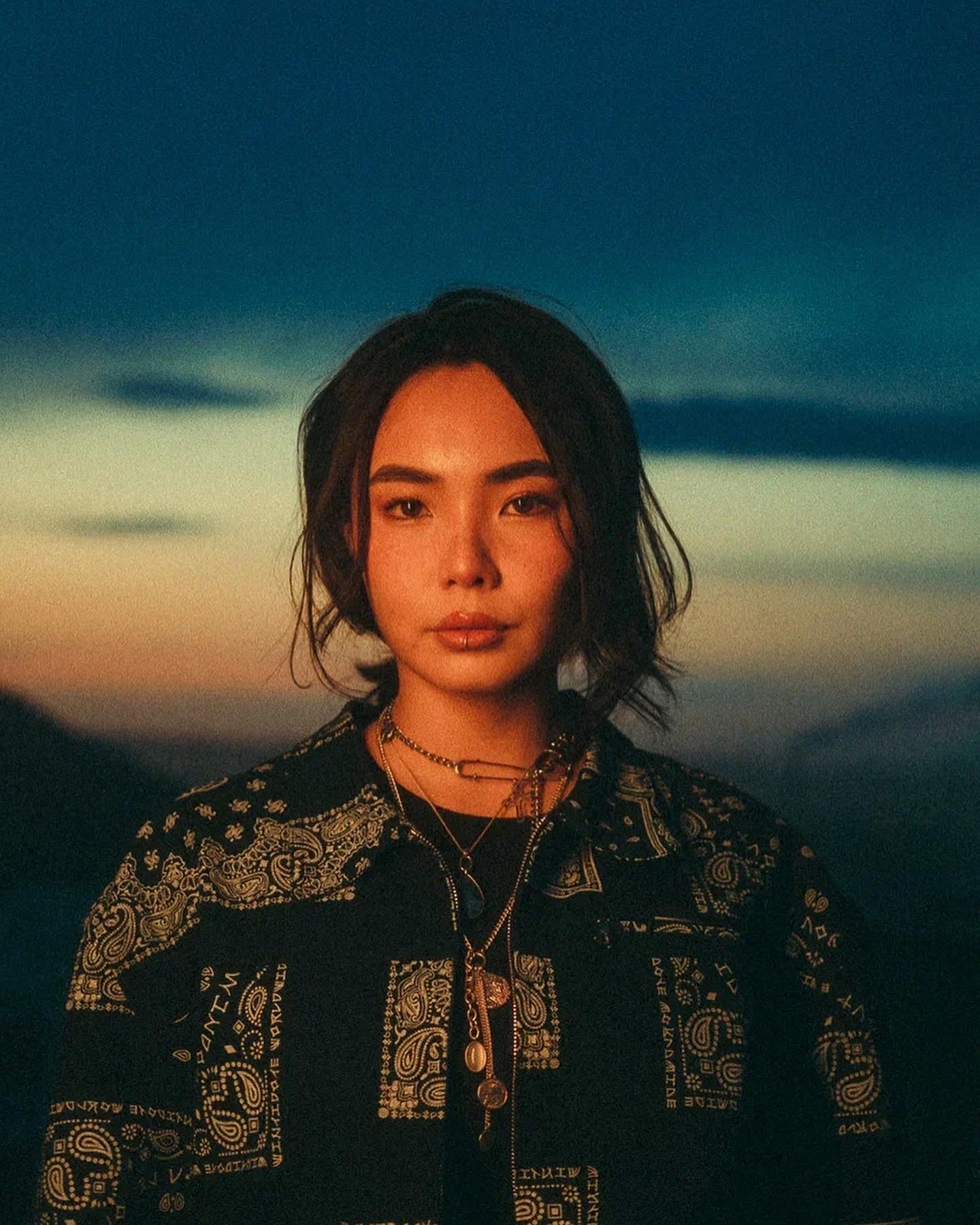
- Twinpearly at Playtime Festival in July 2017.
- Born: Baataryn Ikhersuvd; January 17, 1998 (age 28); Ulaanbaatar, Mongolia
- Occupations: Singer; songwriter
- Years active: 2016 - present

Baataryn Ikhersuvd (Mongolian: Баатарын Ихэрсувд, born 17 January 1998), known professionally as Twinpearly, is a Mongolian singer-songwriter. Twinpearly rose a fame after performing ukulele version of Riptide by Vance Joy at the season two of Mongolian's Got Talent at the age of 17 in which she successfully participated and went to the final stage. Later on, she also participated internationally recognized television reality show The Voice of Mongolia, season 3.

== Early life and career ==
Twinpearly was born on 17 January 1998, in Ulaanbaatar, Mongolia, the eldest child of Baatar. She has two brothers - Tenuun, and Negun. She attended National University of Mongolia as a psychologist in Ulaanbaatar. She speaks English, and Russian. Twinpearly learnt to play guitar at high school. Driven by her passion, Twinpearly performed an ukulele version of Riptide by Vance Joy on Mongolia's Got Talent show stage. The performance was featured on global Got Talent show's highlights. She was a lead singer of an indie band "Le Flaners" which appeared on a stage at Playtime Festival in 2016. The band officially released only one single "Street Thoughts" and disbanded shortly after.

Performances on The Voice of Mongolia season 3.
Round	Song	Original Artist	Original Air Date	Result
Blind Auditions	"Burn"	Ellie Goulding	Jan. 20, 2022	Bold, and Uka turned. join Team Uka
Battles	"Dance To This" (vs. Buyantogtokh S.)	Troye Sivan	May 15, 2021	Saved by coach
Knockouts	"No Roots"	Alice Merton	May 22, 2022	Saved by coach
The Quarter Final	"Inner Peace"	Mekh ZakhQ	May 29, 2022	Public's Vote
Live Semi Final	"Seven Nation Army"	White Stripes	June 5, 2022	Public's Vote
Live Finale	"Happier Than Ever"	Billie Eilish	June 12, 2022	Runner-Up
Live Finale	"Savhin Hurem"	Uka	June 12, 2022	Runner-Up

== Career ==
Twinpearly released her debut single "Get Up" on December 7, 2022 written by herself, produced by Man on the Moon (Tuguldur Ganbold). Prior to this release, Twinpearly was featured on Monstar label's live singing series along with Ebo from hip-hop duo Vandebo.
