= The Voice of Mongolia season 1 =

Coordinates: 47°55′00″N 107°00′00″E

The Voice of Mongolia
- Season 1
- Hosted by: Uuganbayar Enkhbat; Ankhbayar Ganbold
- Coaches: Otgonbayar Damba; Bold Dorjsuren; Ulambayar Davaa; Ononbat Sed
- Winner: Enguun Tseyendash
- Winning coach: Uka
- Runner-up: Bolormaa

Release
- Original network: Mongol HDTV
- Original release: January 21 – May 27, 2018

Season chronology
- Next → Season 2

The Voice of Mongolia is a Mongolian reality talent show that aims to discover new singing talents. The first season, premiered on January 21, 2018 on Mongol HDTV. The series is part of the franchise The Voice and is based on a similar competition format in the Netherlands, The Voice of Holland. The series was created by Dutch television producer John de Mol. It is part of an international series. The winner receives ₮100,000,000 ($38,000) amount of a record deal with Universal Music Group's Mongolian official representative, Mongol Content LLC, and a Nissan Qashqai. Otgonbayar Damba (Otgoo), Bold Dorjsuren (Bold), Ulambayar Davaa (Uka), Ononbat Sed (Ononbat) are the coaches. Each team of singers are mentored and developed by their coach. In the second stage, coaches have two of their team members battle against each other by singing the same song, with the coach choosing which team member to advance. In the final phase, the remaining contestants of a team, compete against each other in live broadcasts. The television audience helps to decide who advances. When one remains for each coach, the four contestants compete against each other in the finale.

Enguun Tseyendash was announced as the winner of the season, beating Team Otgoo's Bolormaa A, Team Bold's Ariunjargal Jantsannorov & Team Ononbat's Usukhbayar Batsaikhan, marking Uka's first win as a coach.

== Coaches & Hosts ==
In late 2017, Mongol TV began announcements of the coaches for the series. First to sign on were Mongolian rock band Hurd's guitarist Otgonbayar Damba and pop singer Bold Dorjsuren. On'n Off Production's headman Ononbat Sed came on board in August 2017. Pop band Kiwi's singer, actress Ulambayar Davaa was added as the final coach a week later.

Uuganbayar Enkhbat & Ankhbayar Ganbold were announced as the show's hosts. The two actors had previously hosted all two seasons of Mongol TV's Mongolia's Got Talent together.

== Teams ==
=== Color key ===
- Winner
- Runner-up
- Third/Fourth place
- Eliminated in the semi-finals
- Eliminated in the quarter-finals
- Eliminated in the knockouts
- Eliminated in the battle rounds
- Withdrew

Coaches	Top 66 artists			
Otgoo				
Otgoo	Bolormaa.A	Munkh-Erdene.G	Sanchir.U	Zoljargal.B
Otgoo	Zandanshagai.E	Dagiisuren.P	Narankhuu.T	Munkhzul.B
Otgoo	Oyunsuren.M	Uranchimeg.B	Iderbat.S	Munkh-Erdene.I
Otgoo	Naranchimeg.A	Telmuunbayar.Ts	Erdenejargal.B	Battungalag.S
Bold				
Bold	Ariunjargal.J	Bujinlkham.O	Munkhbayar.Sh	Sainbileg.B
Bold	Byambakhishig.D	Odmandakh.B	Nasanbuyan.L	Telmen.S
Bold	Ganbileg.E	Bayarjargal.Ya	Bilguun.B	Idermaa.S
Bold	Munkh-Erdene.B	Jargal.A	Bayarchimeg.Ya	Shinezul.A
Uka				
Uka	Enguun.Ts	Batbayar.B	Margad.G	Buyangerel.E
Uka	Zaya.A	Orgil.B	Ankhbayar.O	Bayarsaikhan.B
Uka	Maralgoo.Ch	Erkejan.K	Alungoo.B	Bilegt.Yo
Uka	Davaajargal.S	Khongor.B	Khulan.B	Ulziisaikhan.B
Uka	Misheel.E			
Ononbat				
Ononbat	Usukhbayar.B	Enkhsukh.E	Buren-Ireedui.G	Okhintenger.D
Ononbat	Bayarjargal.Ts	Nomin.S	Batdul.J	Bayarmandakh.B
Ononbat	Khulan.B	Iderjavkhlan.B	Amartuvshin.G	Altannamar.E
Ononbat	Munguntulga.N	Ochirbat.B	Ulzii.B	Ariunchimeg.P
Ononbat	Magsarjav.E			

== Blind Auditions ==
Color key

✔	Coach Pressed "I Want You" Button
	Artist Defaulted to a Coach's Team
	Artist Elected a Coach's Team
	Artist was Eliminated

=== Episode 1 (January 21) ===
The first Blind Audition taped episode was broadcast on January 21, 2018. The coaches performed Queen song, "We Will Rock You" at the start of the show.

Order	Artist	Song	Coach's and contestant's choices			
Order	Artist	Song	Otgoo	Bold	Uka	Ononbat
1	Buren-Ireedui.G	"Ori Zaluu Nas"	—	✔	✔	✔
2	Buyangerel.E	"Only Love Can Hurt Like This"	—	✔	✔	—
3	Alungoo.B	"Underneath Your Clothes"	—	—	✔	—
4	Baatarjargal.E	"Unench Hair"	—	—	—	—
5	Ariunchimeg.P	"Read All About It"	✔	—	—	✔
6	Narankhuu.T	"Erchuud"	✔	—	✔	—
7	Tselmeg.E	"Price Tag"	—	—	—	—
8	Nasanbuyan.L	"Another Love"	✔	✔	✔	✔
9	Khuderbold.B	"Puttin' On the Ritz"	—	—	—	—
10	Idermaa.S	"Something's Got a Hold on Me"	—	✔	—	—
11	Bayarjargal.Ts	"Way Down We Go"	—	✔	✔	✔
12	Munkh-Erdene.G	"All I Want"	✔	✔	✔	✔

=== Episode 2 (January 28) ===
Order	Artist	Song	Coach's and contestant's choices			
Order	Artist	Song	Otgoo	Bold	Uka	Ononbat
1	Erdenebulgan.A	"I'd Do Anything for Love"	—	—	—	—
2	Margad.G	"Bad Romance"	—	—	✔	—
3	Kherlenchimeg.S	"Breathe"	—	—	—	—
4	Erdenejargal.B	"Better Man"	✔	—	—	—
5	Bayarchimeg.Ya	"Try"	✔	✔	—	—
6	Iderjavkhlan.B	"Buruu Ergelt"	✔	✔	✔	✔
7	Sodnomdarjaa.N	"Nud Chini Hair Haruulna"	—	—	—	—
8	Iderbat.A	"Zuudendee Bi Hairtai"	✔	—	—	✔
9	Munkh-Erdene.B	"Here Without You"	✔	✔	✔	—
10	Ochirbat.B	"Always on My Mind"	—	—	—	✔
11	Davaajargal.S	"Russian Roulette"	✔	—	✔	—
12	Ulzii.B	"Aria of Diva Plavalaguna"	—	—	✔	✔
13	Bujinlkham.O	"Oops!... I Did It Again"	✔	✔	✔	✔

=== Episode 3 (February 4) ===
Order	Artist	Song	Coach's and contestant's choices			
Order	Artist	Song	Otgoo	Bold	Uka	Ononbat
1	Bayarsaikhan.B	"Chandelier"	—	—	✔	—
2	Bolortungalag.M	"A Natural Woman"	—	—	—	—
3	BIlguun.B	"Lost Stars"	—	✔	✔	✔
4	Jamsranjamts.G	"Mercy"	—	—	—	—
5	Battungalag.S	"Zuud"	✔	—	—	—
6	Naranchimeg.A	"Piece by Piece"	✔	—	✔	✔
7	Telmen.S	"I Can't Make You Love Me"	—	✔	—	—
8	Enkhsukh.E	"Kiss from a Rose"	✔	✔	✔	✔
9	Gantulga.B	"Demons"	—	—	—	—
10	Zoljargal.B	"Immortality"	✔	—	✔	✔
11	Nyambayar.G	"Zahia"	—	—	—	—
12	Enguun.Ts	"Runnin' (Lose It All)"	✔	✔	✔	✔

=== Episode 4 (February 11) ===
Order	Artist	Song	Coach's and contestant's choices			
Order	Artist	Song	Otgoo	Bold	Uka	Ononbat
1	Odmandakh.B	"Nairah Arga Chini Buruudaad Baina"	✔	✔	✔	✔
2	Zoljargal.O	"You Know I'm No Good"	—	—	—	—
3	Otgonbayar.T	"Borootoi Zunii Dursamj"	—	—	—	—
4	Bilegt.Yo	"Sex on Fire"	—	—	✔	—
5	Batdul.J	"Can't Stop the Feeling!"	—	—	—	✔
6	Khongor.B	"Thinking Out Loud"	—	✔	✔	✔
7	Shinezul.A	"Stay"	✔	✔	—	—
8	Uranchimeg.B	"Somebody Else's Guy"	✔	✔	✔	✔
9	Solongo.U	"Nightingale"	—	—	—	—
10	Sanchir.U	"Believe"	✔	—	—	✔
11	Batbayar.B	"Human"	—	—	✔	—
12	Enkhbayar.E	"Pictures of You"	—	—	—	—
13	Tsogtdelger.D	"Tuund Bi Hairtai Baisan"	—	—	—	—
14	Ganbileg.E	"Moon of Seoul"	✔	✔	✔	✔

=== Episode 5 (February 18) ===
Order	Artist	Song	Coach's and contestant's choices			
Order	Artist	Song	Otgoo	Bold	Uka	Ononbat
1	Dagiisuren.P	"Uzesgelent Mini"	✔	—	—	—
2	Telmuunbayar.Ts	"Crewcabanger"	✔	—	—	—
3	Maralgoo.Ch	"Monster"	—	—	✔	—
4	Erkejan.K	"Nutgaa Sanahui"	✔	✔	✔	✔
5	Binderiya.B	"The Edge of Glory"	—	—	—	—
6	Misheel.E	"Faded"	—	—	✔	—
7	Bat-Ireedui.Kh	"Uuchlaarai Chi Mini"	—	—	—	—
8	Khulan.B	"Just Hold Me"	—	—	✔	—
9	Mungunsukh.J	"Tugs Tuguldur"	—	—	—	—
10	Magsarjav.E	"Without You"	✔	—	—	✔
11	Altannamar.E	"I Put a Spell on You"	✔	—	—	✔
12	Byambakhishig.D	"It's a Man's Man's Man's World"	✔	✔	✔	✔

=== Episode 6 (February 25) ===
Order	Artist	Song	Coach's and contestant's choices			
Order	Artist	Song	Otgoo	Bold	Uka	Ononbat
1	Tserensuren.G	"Find"	—	—	—	—
2	Bolor-Erdene.G	"Bi Tuuniig Harsnaas Hoish"	—	—	—	—
3	Munkhzul.B	"I'd Rather Go Blind"	✔	—	—	—
4	Dulguun.B	"Zombie"	—	—	—	—
5	Amartuvshin.G	"Sugar"	—	—	—	✔
6	Sainbileg.B	"Dakota"	—	✔	—	✔
7	Bilguun.M	"Lose Yourself"	—	—	—	—
8	Orgil.B	"Earned It"	—	—	✔	—
9	Nomin.S	"One Day / Reckoning Song"	—	—	✔	✔
10	Amarmend.E	"Aavdaa"	—	—	—	—
11	Munkh-Erdene.I	"Sixteen Tons"	✔	—	✔	—
12	Oyunsuren.M	"I Got You (I Feel Good)"	✔	✔	✔	✔

=== Episode 7 (March 4) ===
Order	Artist	Song	Coach's and contestant's choices			
Order	Artist	Song	Otgoo	Bold	Uka	Ononbat
1	Okhintenger.D	"Halo"	—	✔	✔	✔
2	Odbaatar.Kh	"I (Who Have Nothing)"	—	—	—	—
3	Zandanshagai.E	"Stop and Stare"	✔	✔	✔	—
4	Enerel.G	"Wings"	—	—	—	—
5	Ulziisaikhan.B	"Numb"	—	—	✔	—
6	Bayarjargal.Ya	"Hurch Chadahgui"	✔	✔	✔	✔
7	Aina.Kh	"Soulmate"	—	—	—	—
8	Munguntulga.N	"Don't Worry Summer Is Coming"	—	—	—	✔
9	Chinguun.U	"Welcome to My Life"	—	—	—	—
10	Myagmarkhand.B	"Million Reasons"	—	—	—	—
11	Ankhbayar.O	"Daam"	—	—	✔	—
12	Usukhbayar.B	"Angel"	✔	✔	✔	✔

=== Episode 8 (March 11) ===
The last Blind Audition episode was broadcast on March 11, 2018. Ononbat & Uka were turned their 17th contestant, and the contestants choose them for their coaches.

Order	Artist	Song	Coach's and contestant's choices			
Order	Artist	Song	Otgoo	Bold	Uka	Ononbat
1	Garid.E	"Degjin Nuden"	—	—	—	—
2	Bayarmandakh.B	"Crazy in Love"	—	—	—	✔
3	Jargal.A	"Rap God"	—	✔	—	—
4	Bayarjavkhlan.B	"When We Were Young"	—	—	—	—
5	Munkhtulga.S	"Gang's Khan"	—	—	—	—
6	Munkhbayar.Sh	"Zuud"	✔	✔	✔	—
7	Sereedar.B	"Let Her Go"	—	—	—	—
8	Sodkhuu.U	"Welcome to Jamrock"	—	—	—	—
9	Khulan.B	"Havriin gants Ulias"	—	✔	—	✔
10	Ariunjargal.J	"Location"	✔	✔	✔	✔
11	Zaya.A	"Love on the Brain"	✔	✔	✔	✔
12	Bolormaa.A	"And I Am Telling You I'm Not Going"	✔	✔	✔	✔

== The Battles ==
After the Blind Auditions, each coach had sixteen to seventeen contestants for the battle rounds that aired from March 25 to April 15, 2018. Each episode featured eight battles consisting of pairings from within each team, and each battle concluding with the respective coach eliminating one of the two or three contestants; the eight winners for each coach advanced to the next round. Team Ononbat performed Queen song, "Bohemian Rhapsody" at the start of the battles.

=== Color key ===
Artist won the battle and advanced to the knockouts
Artist lost the battle but was stolen by another coach and advanced to the knockouts
Artist lost the battle and was eliminated
Artist voluntarily left the competition

Episode	Coach	Order	Winner	Song	Loser
Episode 10 (March 25)	Otgoo	1	Munkh-Erdene	"Have You Ever Seen the Rain?"	Naranchimeg
Episode 10 (March 25)	Bold	2	Nasanbuyan	"Anhnii Hair"	Bayarjargal
Episode 10 (March 25)	Ononbat	3	Usukhbayar	"Say Something"	Ariunchimeg
Episode 10 (March 25)	Uka	4	Zaya	"Black Widow"	Maralgoo
Episode 10 (March 25)	Otgoo	5	Zandanshagai	"Durlaj Bichsen Shuleg"	Erdenejargal
Episode 10 (March 25)	Bold	6	Sainbileg	"Hello"	Bayarchimeg
Episode 10 (March 25)	Ononbat	7	Okhintenger	"Bang Bang"	Khulan
Episode 10 (March 25)	Uka	8	Buyangerel	"Where Did You Sleep Last Night"	Ulziisaikhan
Episode 11 (April 1)	Ononbat	1	Batdul	"Take On Me"	Amartuvshin
Episode 11 (April 1)	Otgoo	2	Sanchir	"You Shook Me All Night Long"	Telmuunbayar
Episode 11 (April 1)	Uka	3	Enguun	"Winter"	Alungoo
Episode 11 (April 1)	Uka	3	Enguun	"Winter"	Davaajargal
Episode 11 (April 1)	Bold	4	Munkhbayar	"Nud Chini Hair Haruulna"	Bilguun
Episode 11 (April 1)	Ononbat	5	Nomin	"No Woman, No Cry"	Munguntulga
Episode 11 (April 1)	Otgoo	6	Zoljargal	"Chi Miniih"	Battungalag
Episode 11 (April 1)	Uka	7	Batbayar	"Crazy"	Bilegt
Episode 11 (April 1)	Bold	8	Ariunjargal	"Shout Out to My Ex"	Idermaa
Episode 12 (April 8)	Uka	1	Ankhbayar	"Solongo Shig"	Khongor
Episode 12 (April 8)	Bold	2	Bujinlkham	"Pumped Up Kicks"	Munkh-Erdene
Episode 12 (April 8)	Otgoo	3	Narankhuu	"Zerleg Tsetsegsiin Hulemj"	Uranchimeg
Episode 12 (April 8)	Ononbat	4	Bayarmandakh	"Adagio"	Ochirbat
Episode 12 (April 8)	Ononbat	4	Bayarmandakh	"Adagio"	Ulzii
Episode 12 (April 8)	Uka	5	Bayarsaikhan	"You and Me"	Khulan
Episode 12 (April 8)	Bold	6	Odmandakh	"Beep"	Jargal
Episode 12 (April 8)	Otgoo	7	Munkhzul	"Jolene"	Munkh-Erdene
Episode 12 (April 8)	Ononbat	8	Bayarjargal	"High Enough"	Magsarjav
Episode 13 (April 15)	Bold	1	Telmen	"Uulen Tsoorhoin Nar"	Shinezul
Episode 13 (April 15)	Uka	2	Orgil	"The Man Who Can't Be Moved"	Misheel
Episode 13 (April 15)	Ononbat	3	Buren-Ireedui	"Total Eclipse of the Heart"	Altannamar
Episode 13 (April 15)	Otgoo	4	Dagiisuren	"I Don't Want to Talk About It"	Iderbat
Episode 13 (April 15)	Bold	5	Byambakhishig	"Don't Let Me Down"	Ganbileg
Episode 13 (April 15)	Uka	6	Margad	"The Heart Wants What It Wants"	Erkejan
Episode 13 (April 15)	Ononbat	7	Enkhsukh	"Havar"	Iderjavkhlan
Episode 13 (April 15)	Otgoo	8	Bolormaa	"Dream On"	Oyunsuren
Episode 14 (Sunday, April 23, 2018)	The thirteenth episode was a special episode titled "The Best of the Battles". It featured some of the best moments from the battles, interview and other unseen content.				

== The knockouts ==
After the battle rounds, each coach had eight contestants for the knockouts that aired from April 28 to May 6. Each day, only one team's contestants performed in order, and when they all performed over, the public voted for their favorite contestants. The most voted two contestants advanced to the quarter-finals. After, the team's coach had to choose two of the remaining 6 contestants. Then each coach had 4 contestants in the quarter-finals.

Color key:

Artist was Saved by the Public's Votes
Artist was Saved by the Coach
Artist was eliminated
Artist voluntarily left the competition

=== Week 1: Team Uka ===
Episode	Coach	Order	Artist	Song	Result
Episode 15 (April 28)	Uka	1	Enguun	"Human"	Public's Vote
Episode 15 (April 28)	Uka	2	Bayarsaikhan	"Munhiin Us"	Eliminated
Episode 15 (April 28)	Uka	3	Margad	"Praying"	Uka's Choice
Episode 15 (April 28)	Uka	4	Ankhbayar	"I Won't Let You Go"	Eliminated
Episode 15 (April 28)	Uka	5	Orgil	"Wish I Knew You"	Eliminated
Episode 15 (April 28)	Uka	6	Zaya	"Stone Cold"	Eliminated
Episode 15 (April 28)	Uka	7	Batbayar	"Redbone"	Public's Vote
Episode 15 (April 28)	Uka	8	Buyangerel	"Believer"	Uka's Choice

Non-competition performances
Order	Performer(s)	Song
15.1	Team Bold (Odmandakh, Ariunjargal, Munkhbayar, Nasanbuyan, Bujinlkham, Sainbileg, Byambakhishig and Telmen)	"Husel Muruudul"
15.2	Choi Joo	"Choniin Nair"

=== Week 1: Team Bold ===
Episode	Coach	Order	Artist	Song	Result
Episode 16 (April 29)	Bold	1	Nasanbuyan	"Whole Lotta Love"	Eliminated
Episode 16 (April 29)	Bold	2	Telmen	"My Love"	Eliminated
Episode 16 (April 29)	Bold	3	Munkhbayar	"Too Good at Goodbyes"	Public's Vote
Episode 16 (April 29)	Bold	4	Odmandakh	"Eejiin Buuveitei Orchlon"	Eliminated
Episode 16 (April 29)	Bold	5	Byambakhishig	"Love On Top"	Eliminated
Episode 16 (April 29)	Bold	6	Sainbileg	"Human"	Bold's Choice
Episode 16 (April 29)	Bold	7	Ariunjargal	"That's What I Like"	Bold's Choice
Episode 16 (April 29)	Bold	8	Bujinlkham	"Empire"	Public's Vote

Non-competition performances
Order	Performer(s)	Song
16.1	Team Otgoo (Narankhuu, Bolormaa, Sanchir, Munkhzul, Munkh-Erdene, Zandanshagai, Zoljargal and Dagiisuren)	"Walk This Way"
16.2	Bat-Orgil and Ononbat	"Zovlon Jargal"

=== Week 2: Team Otgoo ===
Episode	Coach	Order	Artist	Song	Result
Episode 17 (May 5)	Otgoo	1	Zoljargal	"The Show Must Go On"	Otgonbayar's Choice
Episode 17 (May 5)	Otgoo	2	Zandanshagai	"Zuud"	Eliminated
Episode 17 (May 5)	Otgoo	3	Narankhuu	"Aav Eej Hoyor Mini"	Eliminated
Episode 17 (May 5)	Otgoo	4	Sanchir	"Love of My Life"	Otgonbayar's Choice
Episode 17 (May 5)	Otgoo	5	Munkhzul	"Cry Me Out"	Eliminated
Episode 17 (May 5)	Otgoo	6	Dagiisuren	"It's My Life"	Eliminated
Episode 17 (May 5)	Otgoo	7	Bolormaa	"Chi mini"	Public's Vote
Episode 17 (May 5)	Otgoo	8	Munkh-Erdene	"Sign of the Times"	Public's Vote

Non-competition performances
Order	Performer(s)	Song
17.1	Team Ononbat (Buren-Ireedui, Usukhbayar, Okhintenger, Nomin, Enkhsukh, Batdul, Bayarmandakh and Bayarjargal)	"Mongolian Songs Collection"
17.2	Chono	"Uuhai"

=== Team Ononbat (May 6) ===
Episode	Coach	Order	Artist	Song	Result
Episode 18 (May 6)	Ononbat	1	Ohintenger	"Alsiin Gazriin Zereglee"	Ononbat's Choice
Episode 18 (May 6)	Ononbat	2	Batdul	"Toothbrush"	Eliminated
Episode 18 (May 6)	Ononbat	3	Bayarmandah	"Lady"	Eliminated
Episode 18 (May 6)	Ononbat	4	Nomin	"Toxic"	Eliminated
Episode 18 (May 6)	Ononbat	5	Bayarjargal	"Love Me Again"	Eliminated
Episode 18 (May 6)	Ononbat	6	Enhsuh	"When a Man Loves a Woman"	Public's Vote
Episode 18 (May 6)	Ononbat	7	Buren-Ireedui	"The Sound of Silence"	Ononbat's Choice
Episode 18 (May 6)	Ononbat	8	Usuhbayar	"Run"	Public's Vote

Non-competition performances
Order	Performer(s)	Song
18.1	Uka	"Don't Stop"

== Quarter-finals (Mongolian songs) ==
The quarter-finals aired from May 12 to the 13th. Each coach had 4 contestants on their team. In the quarter-finals, the remaining 16 contestants sang only Mongolian songs, respectively. Two teams' contestants performed in one day. After the first team's performances, the coach had to choose only one contestant, who advanced to the next round. After that, the public voted remaining 3 contestants. The most voted contestant advanced to the next round.

Color key:

Artist was Saved by the Public's Votes
Artist was Saved by the Coach
Artist was eliminated

=== Week 3: Team Ononbat & Team Uka ===
Episode	Coach	Order	Artist	Song	Result
Episode 19 (May 12)	Ononbat	1	Buren-Ireedui	"Buural Aav"	Eliminated
Episode 19 (May 12)	Ononbat	2	Ohintenger	"Durlasan Tsas"	Eliminated
Episode 19 (May 12)	Ononbat	3	Enhsuh	"Hojimdson Gemshil"	Public's Vote
Episode 19 (May 12)	Ononbat	4	Usuhbayar	"Huleelt"	Ononbat's Choice
Episode 19 (May 12)	Uka	5	Margad	"Myangan Beer"	Eliminated
Episode 19 (May 12)	Uka	6	Buyangerel	"Ene bol Durlal Bish"	Eliminated
Episode 19 (May 12)	Uka	7	Enguun	"Chi Nad shig Durlaj Chadah uu?"	Uka's Choice
Episode 19 (May 12)	Uka	8	Batbayar	"Margaashiin Nar luu Hamt Aylah uu?"	Public's Vote

Non-competition performances
Order	Performer(s)	Song
19.1	The Colors	"Chi Miniih Bolno"
19.2	Ariunbaatar	"Mongoliin Tal Nutag"

=== Week 3: Team Bold & Team Otgoo ===
Episode	Coach	Order	Artist	Song	Result
Episode 20 (May 13)	Bold	1	Bujinlham	"Chin Hair Mini"	Bold's Choice
Episode 20 (May 13)	Bold	2	Munhbayar	"Bi Durlamaar Baina"	Eliminated
Episode 20 (May 13)	Bold	3	Sainbileg	"Dulguun"	Eliminated
Episode 20 (May 13)	Bold	4	Ariunjargal	"Jargaah Zurhen"	Public's Vote
Episode 20 (May 13)	Otgoo	5	Sanchir	"Haa ch Tsug"	Eliminated
Episode 20 (May 13)	Otgoo	6	Bolormaa	"Jargaj Uzeegui Zul Durlal Mini"	Public's Vote
Episode 20 (May 13)	Otgoo	7	Munh-Erdene	"Chimeegui Ireh Durlal"	Otgonbayar's Choice
Episode 20 (May 13)	Otgoo	8	Zoljargal	"Amidral"	Eliminated

Non-competition performances
Order	Performer(s)	Song
20.1	Mohanik	"Zuulun Misheel", "Chonon Bujig"

== Semi-finals ==
The semi-finals aired on May 20. Each coach had 2 contestants in their team. After the first team's performances, the public voted for their favorite contestants for only 5 minutes, and the most voted contestant advanced to the finals. Each coach had 1 contestant in the finals.

Color key

Artist was Saved by the Public's Votes
Artist was eliminated

=== Week 4 ===
Episode	Coach	Order	Artist	Song	Public's Vote %	Result
Episode 21 (May 20)	Otgoo	1	Bolormaa	"Girl on Fire"	56%	Public's Vote
Episode 21 (May 20)	Otgoo	2	Munh-Erdene	"When I Was Your Man"	44%	Eliminated
Episode 21 (May 20)	Ononbat	3	Enhsuh	"Where Is My Love?"	35%	Eliminated
Episode 21 (May 20)	Ononbat	4	Usuhbayar	"Hair"	65%	Public's Vote
Episode 21 (May 20)	Bold	5	Ariunjargal	"Dancing On My Own"	56%	Public's Vote
Episode 21 (May 20)	Bold	6	Bujinlham	"What Now?"	44%	Eliminated
Episode 21 (May 20)	Uka	7	Enguun	"Creep"	60%	Public's Vote
Episode 21 (May 20)	Uka	8	Batbayar	"Freedom"	40%	Eliminated

Non-competition performances
Order	Performer(s)	Song
21.1	Gantogoo	"Nad Shig Meder"
21.2	Sarantuya	"Ineemtgii Hun"
21.3	Hurd	"Eh Oron"

== Finals ==
Color key

- — Winner
- — Runner-up
- — Third/Fourth place

In the final rounds, (aired May 27 - last day of the season 1) each coach had 1 contestant in his/her team. Bolormaa from Team Otgoo, Ariunjargal from Team Bold, Enguun from Team Uka, Usuhbayar from Team Ononbat. First, the artists performed in order, then Public's Voting system's 1st round is opening, while the artists performing with their coaches, singing only Mongolian songs. Then the most-voted 2 contestants advanced to the next voting round. After, Public's Voting system's round 2 is opening, Public can vote only remaining 2 contestants.

Episode	Coach	Artist	Order	Solo Song	Order	Duet Song (with Coach)	1st Round Result	Order	Original Song	2nd Round Result
Episode 22 (May 27)	Ononbat	Usuhbayar	1	"You Raise Me Up"	6	"Gitariin Mini Uilah Duund"	Eliminated			Third/Fourth Place
Episode 22 (May 27)	Otgonbayar	Bolormaa	2	"The Best"	8	"Eh Ornii Tuluu"	Public's Vote	9	"Cham ruu Ursana"	Runner-up
Episode 22 (May 27)	Uka	Enguun	3	"Never Enough"	7	"Muruudul Bid 2"	Public's Vote	10	"Zuud Neg"	Winner
Episode 22 (May 27)	Bold	Ariunjargal	4	"Killing Me Softly", "Lemon "	5	"Zuvhun Cham ruu"	Eliminated			Third/Fourth Place

== Elimination Chart ==
=== Overall ===
Color key
Artist's info

- — Team Otgoo
- — Team Bold
- — Team Uka
- — Team Ononbat

Result details

- — Winner
- — Runner-up
- — Third place
- — Fourth place
- — Saved by His/Her Coach
- — Saved by the Public
- — Artist did not Perform on that Particular Week
- — Eliminated

Live show results per week
Artist	Battles	Week 1	Week 2	Week 3	Week 4	Finals
Enguun Ts.	Safe	Safe		Safe	Safe	Winner
Bolormaa A.	Safe		Safe	Safe	Safe	Runner-up
Ariunjargal J.	Safe	Safe		Safe	Safe	Third/Fourth Place
Usuhbayar B.	Safe		Safe	Safe	Safe	Third/Fourth Place
Bujinlham O.	Safe	Safe		Safe	Eliminated	Eliminated (semi-finals)
Batbayar B.	Safe	Safe		Safe	Eliminated	Eliminated (semi-finals)
Munh-Erdene G.	Safe		Safe	Safe	Eliminated	Eliminated (semi-finals)
Enhsuh E.	Safe		Safe	Safe	Eliminated	Eliminated (semi-finals)
Margad G.	Safe	Safe		Eliminated	Eliminated (quarter-finals)	
Buyangerel E.	Safe	Safe		Eliminated	Eliminated (quarter-finals)	
Buren-Ireedui G.	Safe		Safe	Eliminated	Eliminated (quarter-finals)	
Sanchir U.	Safe		Safe	Eliminated	Eliminated (quarter-finals)	
Ohintenger D.	Safe		Safe	Eliminated	Eliminated (quarter-finals)	
Munhbayar Sh.	Safe	Safe		Eliminated	Eliminated (quarter-finals)	
Zoljargal B.	Safe		Safe	Eliminated	Eliminated (quarter-finals)	
Sainbileg B.	Safe	Safe		Eliminated	Eliminated (quarter-finals)	
Bayarjargal Ts.	Safe		Eliminated	Eliminated (Week 2)		
Zandanshagai E.	Safe		Eliminated	Eliminated (Week 2)		
Nomin S.	Safe		Eliminated	Eliminated (Week 2)		
Dagiisuren P.	Safe		Eliminated	Eliminated (Week 2)		
Naranhuu T.	Safe		Eliminated	Eliminated (Week 2)		
Batdul J.	Safe		Eliminated	Eliminated (Week 2)		
Munhzul B.	Safe		Eliminated	Eliminated (Week 2)		
Bayarmandah B.	Safe		Eliminated	Eliminated (Week 2)		
Byambahishig D.	Safe	Eliminated	Eliminated (Week 1)			
Zaya A.	Safe	Eliminated	Eliminated (Week 1)			
Anhbayar O.	Safe	Eliminated	Eliminated (Week 1)			
Odmandah B.	Safe	Eliminated	Eliminated (Week 1)			
Orgil B.	Safe	Eliminated	Eliminated (Week 1)			
Nasanbuyan L.	Safe	Eliminated	Eliminated (Week 1)			
Bayarsaihan B.	Safe	Eliminated	Eliminated (Week 1)			
Telmen S.	Safe	Eliminated	Eliminated (Week 1)			

=== Team ===
Color key
Artist's info

- — Team Otgoo
- — Team Bold
- — Team Uka
- — Team Ononbat

Result Details

- — Winner
- — Runner-up
- — Third place
- — Fourth place
- — Saved by His/Her Coach
- — Saved by the public
- — Artist did not perform during that particular Week
- — Eliminated

Artist	Battles	Week 1	Week 2	Week 3	Week 4	Finals
Bolormaa A.	Advanced		Advanced	Advanced	Advanced	Runner-up
Munh-Erdene G.	Advanced		Advanced	Advanced	Eliminated	
Sanchir U.	Advanced		Advanced	Eliminated		
Zoljargal B.	Advanced		Advanced	Eliminated		
Zandanshagai E.	Advanced		Eliminated			
Dagiisuren P.	Advanced		Eliminated			
Naranhuu T.	Advanced		Eliminated			
Munhzul B.	Advanced		Eliminated			
Ariunjargal J.	Advanced	Advanced		Advanced	Advanced	Third/Fourth Place
Bujinlham O.	Advanced	Advanced		Advanced	Eliminated	
Munhbayar Sh.	Advanced	Advanced		Eliminated		
Sainbileg B.	Advanced	Advanced		Eliminated		
Byambahishig D.	Advanced	Eliminated				
Odmandah B.	Advanced	Eliminated				
Nasanbuyan L.	Advanced	Eliminated				
Telmen S.	Advanced	Eliminated				
Enguun Ts.	Advanced	Advanced		Advanced	Advanced	Winner
Batbayar B.	Advanced	Advanced		Advanced	Eliminated	
Margad G.	Advanced	Advanced		Eliminated		
Buyangerel E.	Advanced	Advanced		Eliminated		
Zaya A.	Advanced	Eliminated				
Anhbayar O.	Advanced	Eliminated				
Orgil B.	Advanced	Eliminated				
Bayarsaihan B.	Advanced	Eliminated				
Usuhbayar B.	Advanced		Advanced	Advanced	Advanced	Third/Fourth Place
Enhsuh E.	Advanced		Advanced	Advanced	Eliminated	
Buren-Ireedui G.	Advanced		Advanced	Eliminated		
Ohintenger D.	Advanced		Advanced	Eliminated		
Bayarjargal Ts.	Advanced		Eliminated			
Nomin S.	Advanced		Eliminated			
Batdul J.	Advanced		Eliminated			
Bayarmandah B.	Advanced		Eliminated			
