= Mongolia's Got Talent season 1 =

Mongolia's Got Talent
- Season 1
- Hosted by: Ankhabayar; Uuganbayar
- Judges: Odon Bayarsaikhan (Rokit Bay); Chimeglkham Delgertsetseg; Sarantsetseg Chimgee; Tserendorj Chuluunbat
- Winner: Egshiglent Chimee
- Runners-up: Khasbat Barkhuu; Boldbaatar Myagmartseren

Release
- Original network: Mongol HDTV

Season chronology
- Next → Season 2

Season 1 of the reality competition series Mongolia's Got Talent premiered in June 2015 and was broadcast in September 2015.

- Rokit Bay (Mongolian Rapper)
- Chimeglkham Delgertsetseg (a professional violist)
- Sarantsetseg Chimgee (a news commentator from Mongol TV)
- Tserendorj Chuluunbat (bass guitarist from Haranga rock band) was the 4 judges of the competition.

== First round ==
On the first round about 2100 contestants entered and 104 contestants were advanced to the second round. The first round began in July 2015 and was broadcast on September and finished in October 2015.

== Second round ==
The 104 winners of the judges round was picked by the judges without a contest and 32 contestants was entered the Semi Finals. But a group named Tsohiur Hogjmiin Chuulga was eliminated by own discussion so judges picked Erdene Nandinzaya who was eliminated at the second round.

== Semi-finals ==
The 32 contestants that qualified from round 2 will face each other in groups. The semi-final contains 4 groups and each group contains 8 contestants. The contestants with the most votes automatically advance for the final round and with the second and third most voted contestants will picked by the judges. The winner of the judges choice will qualify for the final round. If the judges choice draws the most voted one will be advanced.

| Key | Buzzed | Judges' choice | Advanced to the Finale | Won the judges' choice | Lost the judges' choice | Picked as Wild Card | Won the peoples' choice | Lost the peoples' choice | Eliminated by own choice |

=== Group 1 ===
| Act | Order | Performance description | Judges' choices | | | | Result |
| Act | Order | Performance description | Chuka | Chimgee | Deegii | Rokit Bay | Result |
|---|---|---|---|---|---|---|---|
| Narny Domog | 1 | Danced as a Cavemen | | | | | Eliminated |
| Jamts Sosorburam | 2 | Played a Mongolian traditional instrument | | | | | Eliminated |
| Erdene Nandinzayaa | 3 | Read and Acted a Mongolian Traditional Child Story about a Kid that doesn't cares about his book. | | | | | Lost the Judges Choice |
| Erdenechuluun Enkh-Amgalan | 4 | Sang and Danced with other Dancers | | | | | Eliminated |
| Erdenepurev Narangarav | 5 | Contested a Risky Acrobatics | | | | | Won the Judges Choice |
| Murat Abai | 6 | Played a Kazak traditional instrument Domber with a rock style | | | | | Eliminated |
| Munkhbaatar Galbaatar | 7 | Sang a Mongolian song | | | | | Eliminated |
| Altankhuyag Otgonbayar | 8 | Sang Elvis Presley's Can't Help Falling in Love | | | | | Advanced |

=== Group 2 ===
| Act | Order | Performance description | Judges' Choices | | | | Result |
| Act | Order | Performance description | Chuka | Chimgee | Deegii | Rokit Bay | Result |
|---|---|---|---|---|---|---|---|
| Ikhbayar Bayarkhuu | 1 | Played Drum | | | | | Eliminated |
| Agua Punsaldulam | 2 | Rapped her own written rhyme | | | | | Eliminated |
| Bulgan Mandukhai and Mongoljin | 3 | Sang Katy Perry's "Roar" | | | | | Eliminated |
| Manan | 4 | Played Mongolian traditional instruments | | | | | Eliminated |
| Narny Ohid | 5 | Acrobatics | | | | | Lost the Judjes Choice |
| Yanzgan Khuree | 6 | Acrobatics | | | | | Won the Judges Choice |
| Gendenjav Selenge | 7 | Sang | | | | | Eliminated |
| Otgonbayar Bayarsaikhan | 8 | Sang his own made song for his father | | | | | Advanced |

=== Group 3 ===
| Act | Order | Performance description | Judges' Choices | | | | Result |
| Act | Order | Performance description | Chuka | Chimgee | Deegii | Rokit Bay | Result |
|---|---|---|---|---|---|---|---|
| Tuvshinjargal Saruultugs | 1 | Danced | | | | | Lost the People's Choice |
| Altansukh Todgerel | 2 | Sang | | | | | Eliminated |
| Unurjargal Davaajargal | 3 | Acrobatics | | | | | Eliminated |
| Gankhuyag Chinchuluun | 4 | Sang | | | | | Eliminated |
| Egshiglent Chimee | 5 | Played Instruments | | | | | Advanced |
| Bat-Ulzii Temuulen Munkhbat Khaliun | 6 | Break Dance and Acrobatics | | | | | Won the People's Choice |
| Cansonans | 7 | Sang | | | | | Eliminated |
| Naranbaatar Bars-Od | 8 | None | None | None | None | None | Eliminated |

=== Group 4 ===
| Act | Order | Performance description | Judges' Choices | | | | Result |
| Act | Order | Performance description | Chuka | Chimgee | Deegii | Rokit Bay | Result |
|---|---|---|---|---|---|---|---|
| Borte Chonyn Urs | 1 | Danced | | | | | Eliminated |
| Purevsuren Tuguldur | 2 | Sang | | | | | Eliminated |
| Mongol Ongod | 3 | Sang | | | | | Eliminated |
| Jargalsaikhan Dulguun | 4 | Danced | | | | | Eliminated |
| Enkh-Amgalan Aldryngegeen | 5 | Sang Maroon 5's Payphone | | | | | Eliminated |
| Angarag Uranbileg | 6 | Air Acrobatics | | | | | Won the Judges' Choice |
| Khasbat Barkhuu Boldbaatar Myagmartseren | 7 | Played Flute and Yochin | | | | | Advanced |
| Purevnyam Khan-Uul | 8 | Sang | | | | | Lost the Judges' Choice |

== Finale ==
The Winners and the Runners-Up of the Semi Finals was faced each other in a single group. The Winner was Egshiglent Chimee and was awarded 100 Million ₮ about 50 Thousand $.

| Key | Buzzed | Winner | Runners-Up | 3rd place | 4th place | 5th place | 6th place | 7th place | 8th place |

=== Final group ===
| Act | Order | Performance description | Buzzes | | | | Result |
| Act | Order | Performance description | Chuka | Chimgee | Deegii | Rokit Bay | Result |
|---|---|---|---|---|---|---|---|
| Angarag Uranbileg | 1 | Ballet | | | | | 7th place |
| Altankhuyag Otgonbayar | 2 | Sang a Country Song | | | | | 3rd place |
| Egshiglent Chimee | 3 | Played Instrument | | | | | Winner |
| Erdenepurev Narangarav | 4 | Acrobatics | | | | | 5th place |
| Khasbat Barkhuu Boldbaatar Myagmartseren | 5 | Played Flute and Yochin | | | | | Runners-Up |
| Bat-Ulzii Temuulen Munkhbat Khaliun | 6 | Danced | | | | | 4th place |
| Otgonbayar Bayarsaikhan | 7 | Sang | | | | | 8th place |
| Yanzgan Khuree | 8 | Danced | | | | | 6th place |
