= Lkhagva Erdene =

Mongolian TV producer and reporter

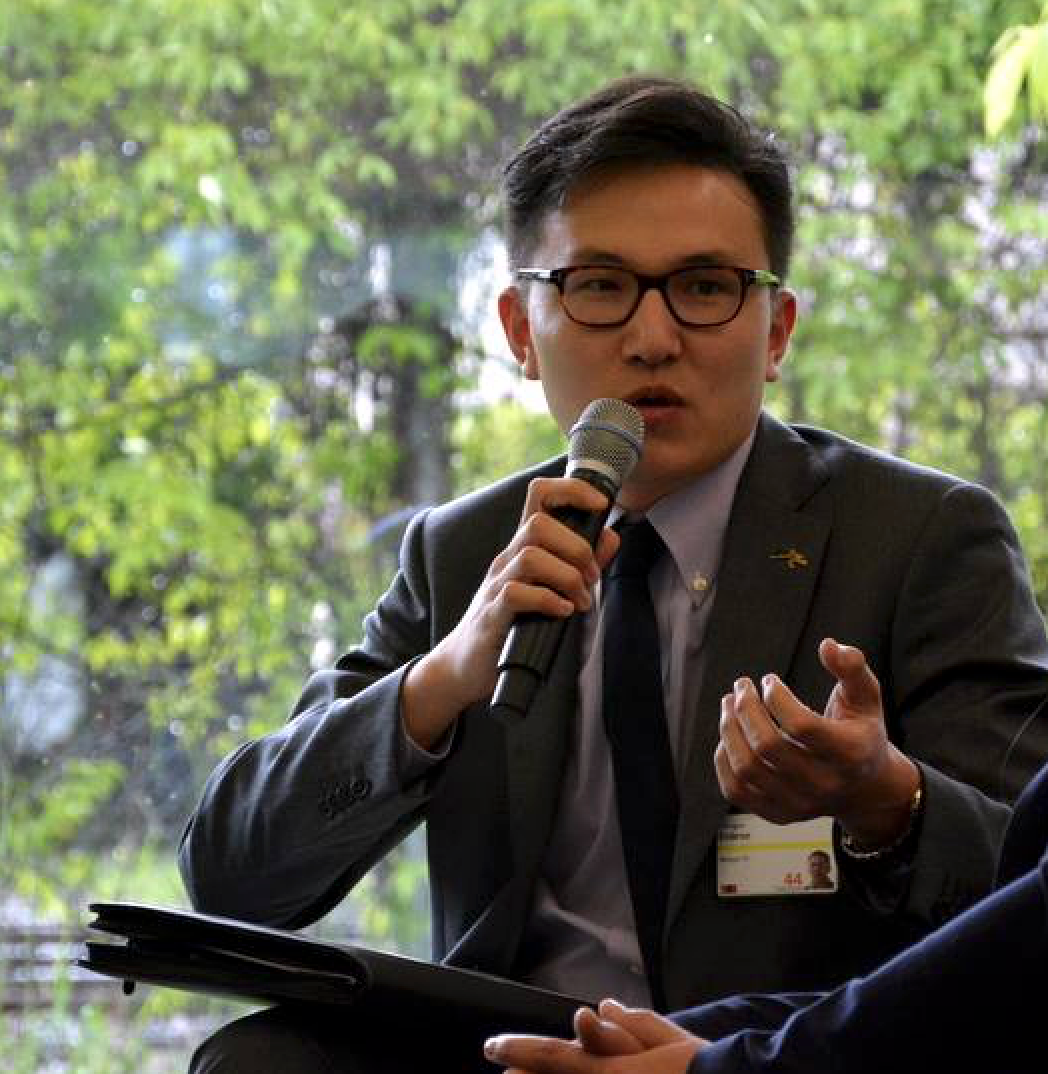
- Born: 11 March 1987 (age 39); Darkhan, Mongolian PR
- Occupations: Television producer; Investigative journalist
- Website: lhagva.com/about-lkhagva/

Lkhagva Erdene (born 11 March 1987) is a Mongolian TV host, television producer, investigative reporter and activist. He is the television host of Mongol TV's "Nuudel Shiidel" debate show and the channel's current Executive Producer of News. He has written for The Diplomat and is a regular contributor to Ikon.mn.

In 2017, Erdene along with a group of reporters from the International Council of Investigative Journalists (ICIJ) were awarded a Pulitzer Prize for Explanatory Reporting. He had collaborated with the group on the Panama Papers Investigation, exposing hidden offshore tax havens.

Erdene is best known in Mongolia for shedding light on political corruption cases and is known to audiences for his direct style. Through leadership in groups such as the Media Council of Mongolia, Erdene continues to play a role in strengthening the role and ethical standards of the media sector as a means to contribute to democratic development in the country.

== Early life ==
Lkhagva Erdene was born in Darkhan, Mongolia; as a geologist and Navagtseren, an engineer. He has a brother and sister. As a child, Erdene experienced the country's political and economic transition from communism to democracy.

At age 15, Erdene won a scholarship to study in New Hampshire. Not being able to afford tuition abroad, "scholarships were the only option", and eventually, Erdene earned a master's degree in journalism from the University of Hong Kong through the prestigious Rotary International scholarship. He aimed to study what would allow him to work to promote positive social change in his country and chose journalism as the field that scholarships would most likely fund.

== Career ==
Erdene started his career as a court interpreter and aide to Mongolia's Finance Minister. After completing a degree in journalism from the University of Hong Kong, Erdene became interested in investigative journalism in particular, which was sparked by the revelation that the former Finance Minister for whom Erdene had staffed, Bayartsogt Sangajav, had accumulated over $1 million in a Swiss bank account; coverage of this had emerged in the international media that year.

Erdene was surprised by the absence of media coverage inside the country, questioning the conflicts of interest among the mainstream media institutions in the country and their willingness to overlook corruption. Upset that the Mongolian media "[tending] to shy away from investigative reporting", he began to pursue the field.

== Mongol TV ==
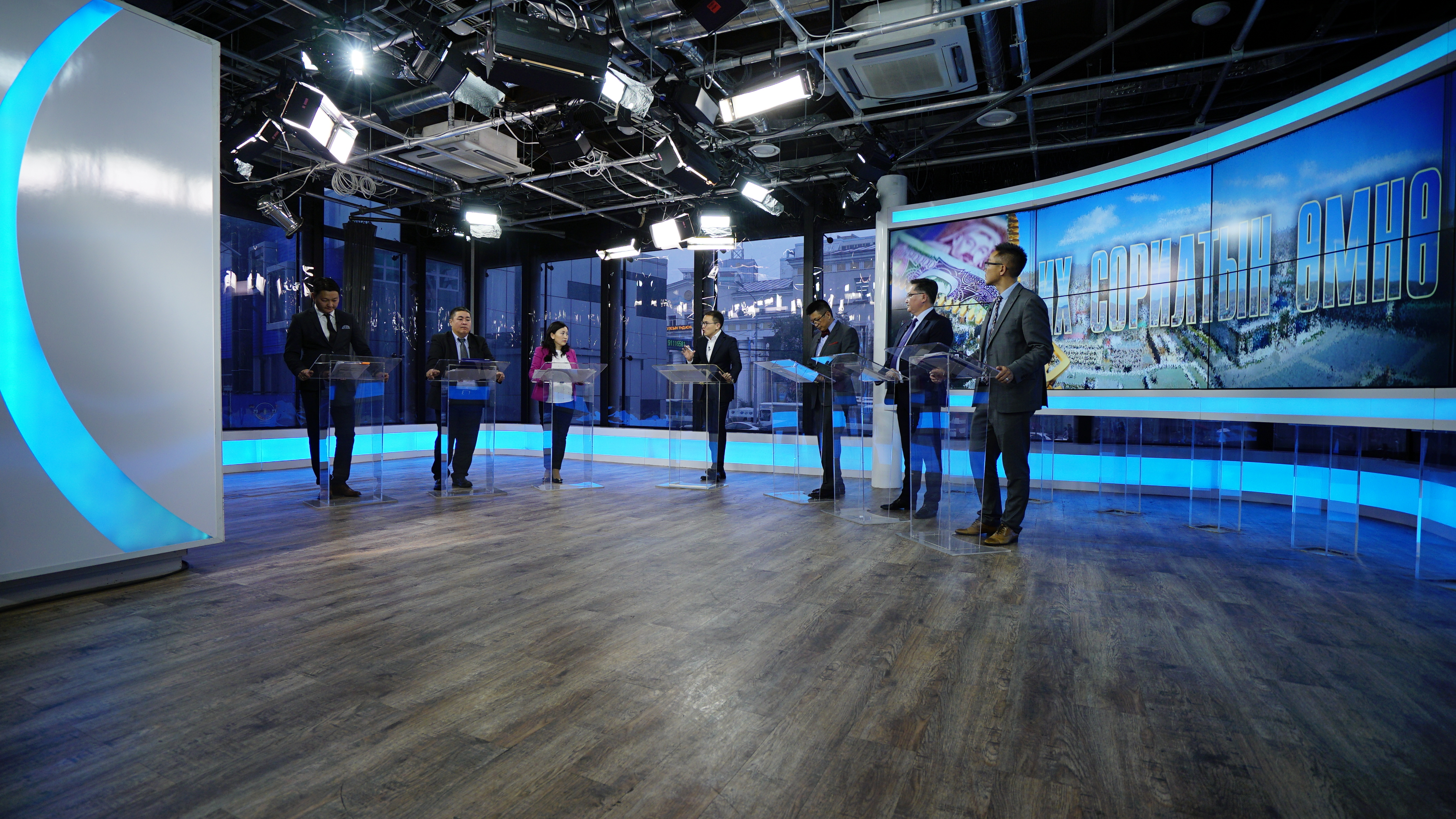
Erdene hosting the Nuudel Shidel debate program on Mongol TV in 2017

Erdene joined the relatively unknown and new Mongol TV television channel as a journalist upon returning to Ulaanbaatar in 2013, wanting to focus on investigative stories not tackled by mainstream media. He was subsequently promoted to lead the news division as its Executive Producer of News. In addition to this role at Mongol TV, he produced popular entertainment programs such as Mongolia's Got Talent.

In 2013, Erdene's team led an undercover investigation to reveal that 9 broadcasters, newspapers, and digital websites had been influenced by biased, paid sources. The Mongol TV news team planted fictitious stories of the McDonald's fast-food chain opening its first franchise operation in Mongolia among the news outlets, which ran the story as news unquestioningly without verification and fact-checking. This exposed the poor journalism standards and ethics prevalent among the media at the time.

Viewership of Mongol TV's news programs skyrocketed in popularity, becoming the most watched in the last quarter of 2016, with roughly half a million people tuning in and following on social media in a country with a population of three million people. The station has since become one of the most popular news outlets in Mongolia.

Discussing current issues and proposed legislative bills, Erdene appears on air each week as the host to the program "Nuudel Shiidel" (meaning "Actionable Solutions" in English). The show has invited high-profile guests such as mayors, lawmakers, former and current heads, challenging them within a debate format. The program plays a significant role in influencing the national political debate in Mongolia by making politicians' and political parties' agendas accessible to general audiences.

In April 2017, Erdene called attention to a censorship bill threatening media activities in the run-up to the presidential election. Working with a group of broadcasters and print media outlets in the country, they staged a 'blackout' by refraining from broadcasting the news. The protest called attention and triggered a public outcry regarding the bill.

== Panama Papers investigation ==
After the Panama Papers were released, Erdene immediately approached the International Council of Investigative Journalists to allow him and his investigative team to have access to the leaked files. From the data, they uncovered information pointing to the fact that the former prime minister, son of the mayor of Ulaanbaatar, and a foreign affairs advisor to the president, were linked to offshore companies and had been in possession of significant foreign assets. The discovery and dissemination of this information to the general public led to formulation of a new law prohibiting public servants from owning or using offshore financing mechanisms.

In May 2017, the 300 reporters who collaborated on the Panama Papers Investigation to expose hidden offshore tax havens were awarded a Pulitzer Prize for Explanatory Reporting at Columbia University.

== Controversy ==
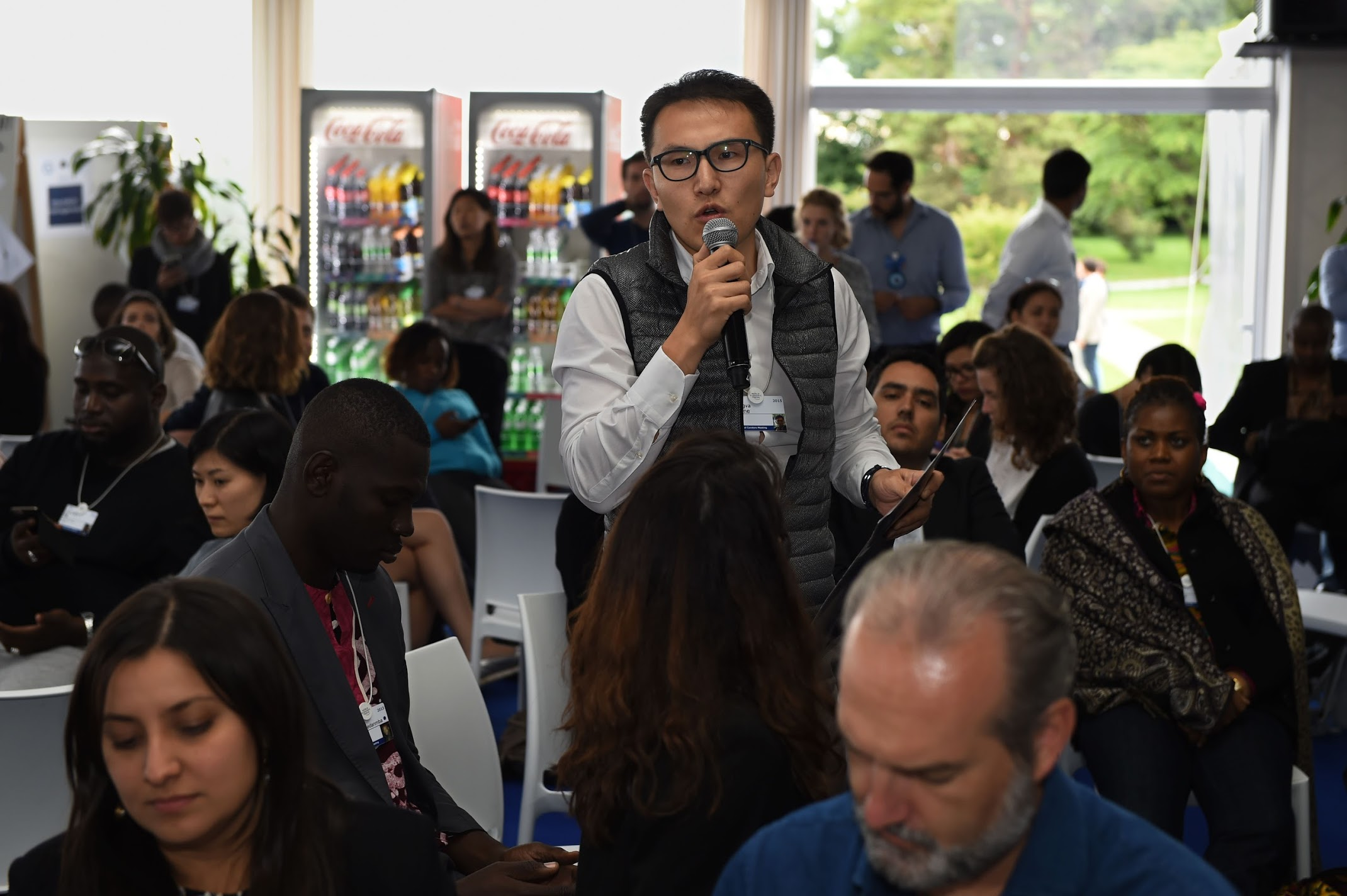
Erdene asking a question at the World Economic Forum Global Shapers Annual Curator's Meeting in Geneva.

Erdene's style as a debate program host and investigative reporter is known to be "direct and confrontational." His hardline style and being unafraid to confront politicians, businesses and fellow journalists has earned him a unique reputation.

At a press briefing on the air pollution issue in 2017, controversy arose when social media commentator pointed out that the former President of Mongolia, Tsakhiagiin Elbegdorj had shown favoritism during the briefing towards Erdene by picking on him and calling him out by name repeatedly. Other reporters later pointed to the fact that Erdene had in fact raised his hands first, thus Elbegori was simply picking the reporter in the room who was first to ask questions.

Erdene has also made the controversial statement aimed at politicians, saying that "his journalism is more meaningful than [other] campaign platforms."

== Media and development in Mongolia ==
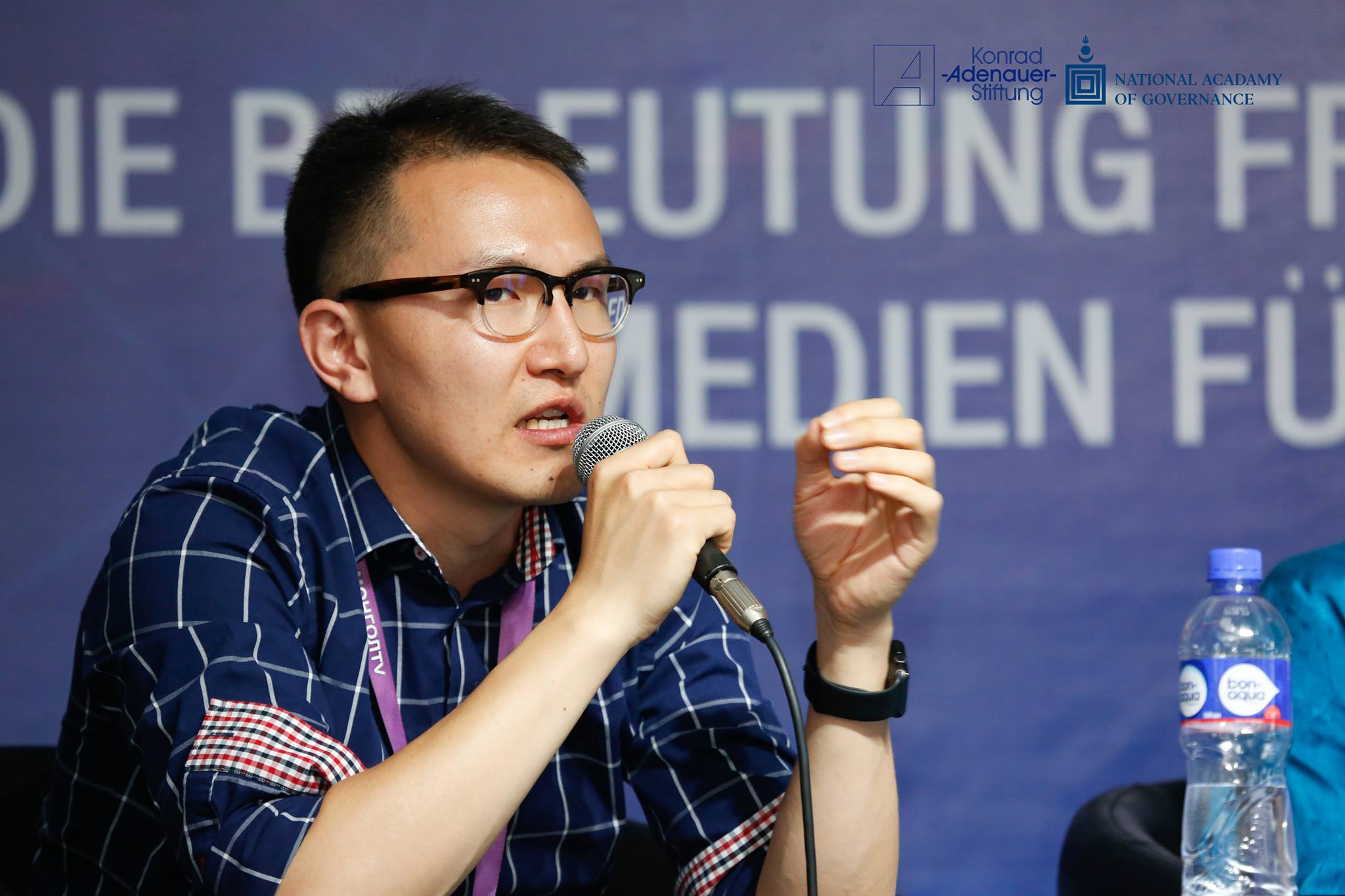
Erdene speaking on the role of media in Mongolia

Erdene is involved in efforts to strengthen the media and civil society sectors in Mongolia. He has said of development in Mongolia, "we want change, and we want it right now."

He noted, "I see journalism as a tool to fight corruption, platform to speak truth to power, and process to better our society." A key to a stronger democracy, Erdene elaborated, is through an independent, strong and ethical media that is able to stand up to the interests of politicians and businesses.

He and other journalists founded the Media Council of Mongolia in 2015 as the country's first initiative to promote higher reporting standards, media self-regulation and journalistic ethics. He continues to serve as an Ethics Committee member.

Erdene views the poor quality of journalistic ethics and the spread of fake news as destructive forces. To combat this, he has been working to launch a digital media company aimed at "in-depth reporting in the post-truth era with a more critical tone and better storytelling."

He served as Curator to the World Economic Forum's Ulaanbaatar Global Shapers Hub between 2015 and 2016.

== Miscellaneous ==
Erdene appears in Season 2 of the series Huang's World interviewing Eddie Huang in 2014. He also appears in an electro music video called "Never Cry Again" by Dash Berlin.
