= CNBC (disambiguation) =

CNBC is the Consumer News and Business Channel, a television business news channel based in Englewood Cliffs, New Jersey, United States.

- List of CNBC channels

CNBC may also refer to:

== Organizations ==
- Commercial Neutral Broadcasting Company, a pirate radio station from the Netherlands (1960–1961)
- Canadian Neutron Beam Centre, a national centre for materials research using neutrons
- Centre for Neuroscience and Cell Biology, a bioscience and biomedicine research institute of the University of Coimbra, Portugal
- Center for the Neural Basis of Cognition, a joint Carnegie Mellon University/University of Pittsburgh research center in Pittsburgh, Pennsylvania, United States; see Peter K. Machamer
