= Kiwi (band) =

Mongolian girl musical group

Kiwi/Киви
- Origin: Mongolia
- Genres: Pop, R&B, Disco
- Years active: 2004–2024
- Members: Ulambayar; Namuun; Khaliun
- Past members: Enkhzol; Solongo; Altantsetseg

Kiwi (Mongolian: Киви) is a girl group from Mongolia. The group initially consisted of Ulambayar, Namuun, and Enkhzol. The band was a personal project by producer Angirmaa.

The band has had a total of 6 different members during its 20-year run. The two permanent members during all its iterations were Uka and Namuun. They made their debut with their first album Khuslee Kheln in 2006. The group was named the "Best Band" in 2013.

As of 2010, the only active member of the band is Ulambayar. She has gone on to release six solo albums, I am in love, 11.06, Khugjim, Don't Stop, and Do it.

Kiwi is widely regarded as the best modern girl group in Mongolia since Three Girls, Lipstick, Emotion.

== Members ==
- "Uka" Ulambayar Davaa (Ука) (2004-2024)
- Khaliun - second member (Халиу)
- "Namuunaa" Namuun Tsolmon(Намуунаа) (2004-2024)

=== Former members ===
- Enkhzol - first member (Зогоо)
- "Agi" Altantsetseg Puntsag (Аги) (2007-2024)
- Solongo - third member (Соко)

== Discography ==
- Хүслээ хэлнэ (2006)
- Гурван сэтгэл нэг хүсэл (2007)
- Гурван сэтгэл нэг хүсэл DVD (2007)
- Чамд Амжилт Хүсье! (2008)
- Чамд Амжилт Хүсье! DVD (2008)
- Хүсэл (2009)
- Таван жил DVD (2010)
- Бидний дурлал (2010)
- I am in love (2011)
- Greatest Hits (2013)
- 2014 (2013)
- One moment (2015)
- 11.06 (2016)
- Хөгжим (2017)
- Өнгө аяс (2017)
- Удахгүй ээ (2017)
- Don't Stop (2018)
- Do It (2020)
- Ука New album
- Намуун New album
- Киви New album

== Lost Songs ==
- Гэрэлт-Од (2005)
- Сүүлчийн найраглал (2007)
- Two luv Birds (2011)
- Хар нүдэн бүсгүй
- Сартай шөнө
- Эхийн тухай дуу
- Улирлын сайхан авга
- Зүүдний ханхүү (Miss Mongolia 2011)
- Gun fire
- Хол хайр
- Харгуй замын эхэн адаг
- 2014 тоглолтын гадаад дуу

== Awards ==
- 10th Pentatonic awards, 2007, Best Debut Band
- UBS Music Video Awards 2008, Best Debut Single

== See also ==
- Music of Mongolia
