= Lipstick (band) =

Mongolian band

Lipstick (Mongolian: Уруулын будаг, Uruuliin budag) is a Mongolian all-female band. Lipstick's music varies between melodic pop songs, R&B, and pumping disco beats. They were formed on March 1, 1999. The next year they won the Pentatonic award, a national rock and pop music award, as the best debut band. Since then they have received several other prominent awards for their work and were very successful with the younger generation in Mongolia from 1999 to 2002. They all sing and play instruments such as keyboard, solo guitar, bass guitar and drums. They also used traditional instruments such as the Shanz (a 3-stringed plucked musical instrument) and the Yatga (a kind of zither) for their music, e.g. in the songs Khüree khüükhnüüd 'City ladies' and Sarnai tsetseg 'Rose'. As of 2007, the band is inactive, but still widely considered one of the representative Mongolian pop bands.

== Awards ==
- 2000, Pentatonic award (best debut band)
- 2001, UBS music award (Best video clip for Khüree Khüükhnüüd "City Ladies")
- 2002, Golden microphone (best band)

== Discography ==
- Хүрээ xүүxнүүд (Khüree khüükhnüüd 'City ladies'), 1999
- Unplugged, 2001
- Xэлж амжаагүй xайр (Khelj amjaagüi khair 'A love that I didn't manage to confess'), 2002

== Concerts ==
- Хүрээ xүүxнүүд (Khüree khüükhnüüd 'City Ladies'), at the State Circus (1999)
- "TV unplugged live concert of Lipstick" on Ulaanbaatar Broadcasting System (UBS) music channel, in UBS studio (2000)
- Уруулын будагтай xацар (Uruuliin budagtai khatsar 'Cheek with lipstick on it'), at the Wrestling Palace, (2000)
- Үүрдийн жаргалын эрэлд (Üürdiin jargaliin ereld 'On a search for eternal happiness'), in the UB Palace (2003)

== Current members ==
- Gereltuyaa (Gegeenee, Gerlee) - Keyboards
- Delgermaa (Deegii) - Rhythm and lead guitar
- Ichinkhorloo (Ichko) - Drums
- Ganchimeg (Ganaa) - Bass guitar

Former member:

- Enkhjargal (Enjii)
