= Mongolia's Got Talent =

- Created by: Simon Cowell
- Presented by: Ankhbayar; Uuganbayar
- Judges: Odon Bayrsaikhan (Rokit Bay); Tserenlham Delgertsetseg; Sarantsetseg Chimgee; Tserendorj Chuluunbat

Original release
- Network: Mongol HDTV
- Release: July 2015 – present

Mongolia's Got Talent (Mongolian: Авьяаслаг Монголчууд) began in June 2015 and the season 1 was broadcast in September 2015 on Mongol HDTV.

== Judges ==
Odon Bayrsaikhan (Rokit Bay)
Chimedlham Delgertsetseg (Deegii)

Sarantsetseg Chimgee (Chimgee)
Tserendorj Chuluunbat (Chuka) were the four judges of the season 1

== Season overview ==
=== Season 1 ===
The first season of this series began in July 2015 and ended on December 13, 2015. The winner was announced on the last day of the series, and an instrumental group called Egshiglent Chimee was the first-ever winner of Mongolia's Got Talent and was awarded 100 million ₮. The runners-up were another musical group with two men called Khasbat Barkhuu and Boldbaatar Myagmartseren. The two men played flute and yochin. The third-placed contestant, called Altanhuyag Otgonbayar, sang with lower pitch and had a sensation in Mongolia. The men had the most viewed video on Mongolia's Got Talent's YouTube Channel with 670,000 views and have almost 1 million views with all 3 videos combined.

=== Season 3 ===
The 3rd season of Mongolia's Got Talent had begun filming in summer 2018 and was broadcast in fall 2018. The winner was announced on the last day of the series, 16 December. Magician Bilegt C. was the winner of Mongolia's Got Talent season 3 and the runner-ups were Dulma and Pasha from Buriad, Russia. The winner Bilegt C. was initially earned the golden buzzer of judge Ariunbaatar, first ever magician who earned golden buzzer in show's history. Judges were Bayarsaikhan Odon/Rokit Bay "Rokit Bay". , Undarmaa Gonchig, Anujin Purev-Ochir, Ariunbaatar Ganbaatar and the host was Manduul B.

=== Season 4 ===
The 4th season of Mongolia's Got Talent began filming in the summer of 2022 and was broadcast in fall 2023. The winner was announced on the last day of the series, the 26th of November. Dancer Khasar. N and Naranchimeg. J won Mongolia's Got Talent season 4, and the runner-ups were Ogtorguin Okhid and Cherry Bomb. The winner Khasar.N, Naranchimeg.J initially earned the golden buzzer from Judge Delgertsetseg. Judges were Battur Batbaatar "Anguuch". , Erdenechimeg Gantugs, Delgertsetseg Chukhalaa, Chuluunbat Tserendorj and the host was Erkhbayar Ulamnemekh.
