= Enguun =

Mongolian violinist and singer

Enguun Цэендашийн Энгүүн
- Birth name: Engüün Tseyendash
- Also known as: Engüün
- Born: September 7, 2000 (age 24); Ulaanbaatar, Mongolia
- Genres: Pop; Contemporary R&B
- Occupations: Singer; Violinist
- Instruments: Vocals; Violin
- Years active: 2018–present

Tseyendashiin Engüün (Mongolian: Цэендашийн Энгүүн, born 7 September 2000) is a Mongolian professional violinist, and singer. She is the winner of season 1 of The Voice of Mongolia at the age of 17. After winning the show, Engüün was signed to Mongol Content LLC.

== Career ==
At her age of 5, Engüün enrolled in Mongolian State Conservatory as a disciple of professional violinist Enkh. J who is a graduate of Komitas State Conservatory of Yerevan. Engüün graduated in Mongolian State Condervatory in 2020. She majored in Musician of String Music Orchestra.

=== The Voice ===
Engüün mentioned on an interview that she always had a thought that she would enter if "The Voice" was organized in Mongolia. When Mongol TV announced that they were holding the show with official rights, she directly signed up for blind audition. It was her very first singing competition.

==== Performances on The Voice ====
Stage	Song	Original artist	Result
Blind Audition (1st stage)	"Runnin' (Lose It All)"	Naughty Boy ft. Beyoncé, Arrow Benjamin	Otgonbayar, Bold, Uka, and Ononbat turned. Joined Uka team.
The Battles (2nd stage)	"Winter"	Birdy	Saved by coach
The Knockouts (3rd stage)	"Human"	Christina Perri	Saved by public
The Quarter-Finals	"Chi nad shig durlaj chadah uu?"	Niciton	Saved by coach
Live Semi-finals	"Creep"	Radiohead	Saved by public
Live Final	"Never Enough"	"The Greatest Showman" OST	Saved by public
Live Final	"Muruudul Bid Hoyor"	Uka	Saved by public
Live Final	"Zuud neg"	Engüün	Winner

== Discography ==
Singles	Released Year	Writers		Music genre	Refs
Singles	Released Year	Lyrics	Music	Music genre	Refs
Kaleidoscope	2020	Munkhzul J. Enguun	Ocean Grey Enguun	Pop	
I'm in Love	2019	Enguun	Ocean Grey	Pop	
Bi uuriinhuuruu	2019	Togtuun G. (The Colors)	Dulguun B. (Magnolian)	Pop	
Chi nad shig durlaj chadah uu	2019	Khurelbaatar D.	Ulzii-Orshih D.	Ballad	
Uuchlalt guih gej	2019	Munkhbold D.		Ballad	
Haluun zurh OST	2019	Gantsetseg D.	Tsogbayar B.	OST	
