= CNBC (international) =

CNBC all channels list

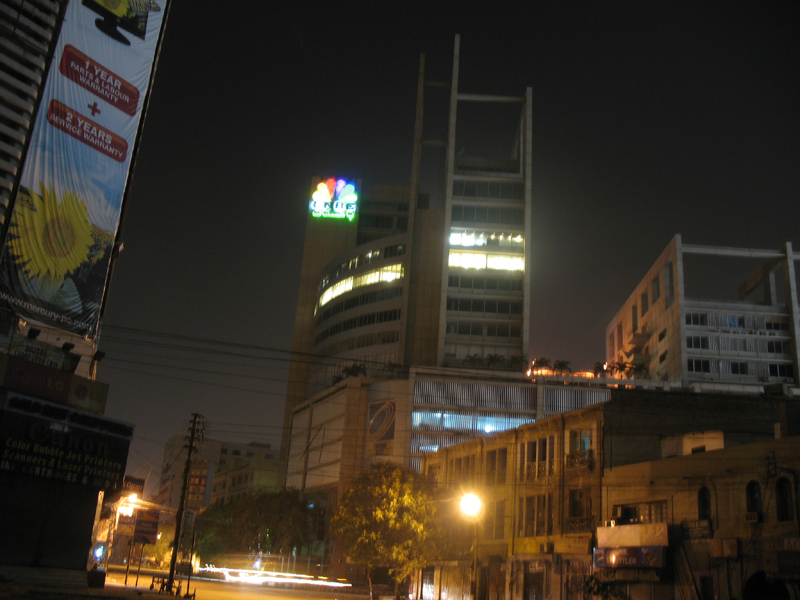
CNBC Pakistan headquarters in Lahore.

This is a list of channels broadcast under the CNBC brand (formerly Consumer News and Business Channel) by Versant and its affiliates around the world. Following on from the original United States–based channel, launched in 1989, European and Asian versions were established in 1995 and 1996 respectively. Since then, sub-continental and local language versions of the channel have been created in Europe, Asia, Africa, and South America, many under a licensing agreement. At present, sixteen distinct CNBC channels exist worldwide, of which seven are wholly owned by Versant and a further nine have Versant as a minority stakeholder or a licensor. A further channel, the Korean language operated SBS-CNBC, began broadcasting on December 28, 2009, in conjunction with Seoul Broadcasting System. Later, the Indonesian language–operated CNBC Indonesia was launched in 2018, in conjunction with Trans Media.

== List of channels ==
Channel	Established	Owner(s)^{[A]}	Language	Headquarters	Area served
Class CNBC	2000^{[B]}	Class Editori (60%), Mediaset (20%), Versant (20%)	Italian	Milan, Italy	Italy
CNBC	1989	Versant	English	Englewood Cliffs, New Jersey	United States, Canada
CNBC Africa	2007	Versant / Africa Business News	English	Johannesburg, South Africa	Africa
CNBC Arabia	2003	Middle East Business News (franchisee)	Arabic	Dubai, United Arab Emirates	Arab world
CNBC Asia	1995^{[C]}	Versant^{[D]}	English	Singapore	Asia
CNBC Awaaz	2005	TV18 and Versant	Hindi	Mumbai, India	India
Times Brasil^{[J]}	2024	Times Brasil (85%), Attention Economics (15%) (franchisee)	Portuguese	São Paulo, Brazil	Brazil
CNBC Europe	1996^{[E]}	Versant^{[F]}	English	London, England	Europe
CNBC TV18	1999^{[G]}	TV18 and Versant	English	Mumbai, India	India
CNBC World	2001	Versant^{[H]}	English	Englewood Cliffs, New Jersey	Worldwide
Nikkei CNBC	1999	Nikkei (51%), Versant, TV Tokyo, Jupiter TV	Japanese^{[I]}	Tokyo, Japan	Japan
CNBC Indonesia	2018	Trans Media (franchisee)	Indonesian	Jakarta, Indonesia	Indonesia
CNBC Bajar	2014	TV18 and Versant	Gujarati	New Delhi, India	India
CNBC-e	2024	Versant and İlbak Holding	Turkish	Istanbul, Turkey	Turkey
CNBC Mongolia	2025	Larisco Media Group	Mongolian	Ulaanbaatar, Mongolia	Mongolia

== Closed channels ==
TVN CNBC started in 2007 and closed in 2014, in Poland. MBN-CNBC started in 2002 and rechanged mbn in 2005 and relaunched general channel Maeil Broadcasting Network in 2011 in South Korea, CNBC was also cooperated with etomato and Chosun Ilbo (now cooperate with Seoul Broadcasting System). CNBC Pakistan started in 2005 and became Jaag TV in 2013 in Pakistan. SBS CNBC started on December 28, 2009, and closed on December 31, 2020, and became SBS Biz. In Thailand, JKN-CNBC started on January 6, 2020, and closed on September 30, 2020.

=== Local feeds ===
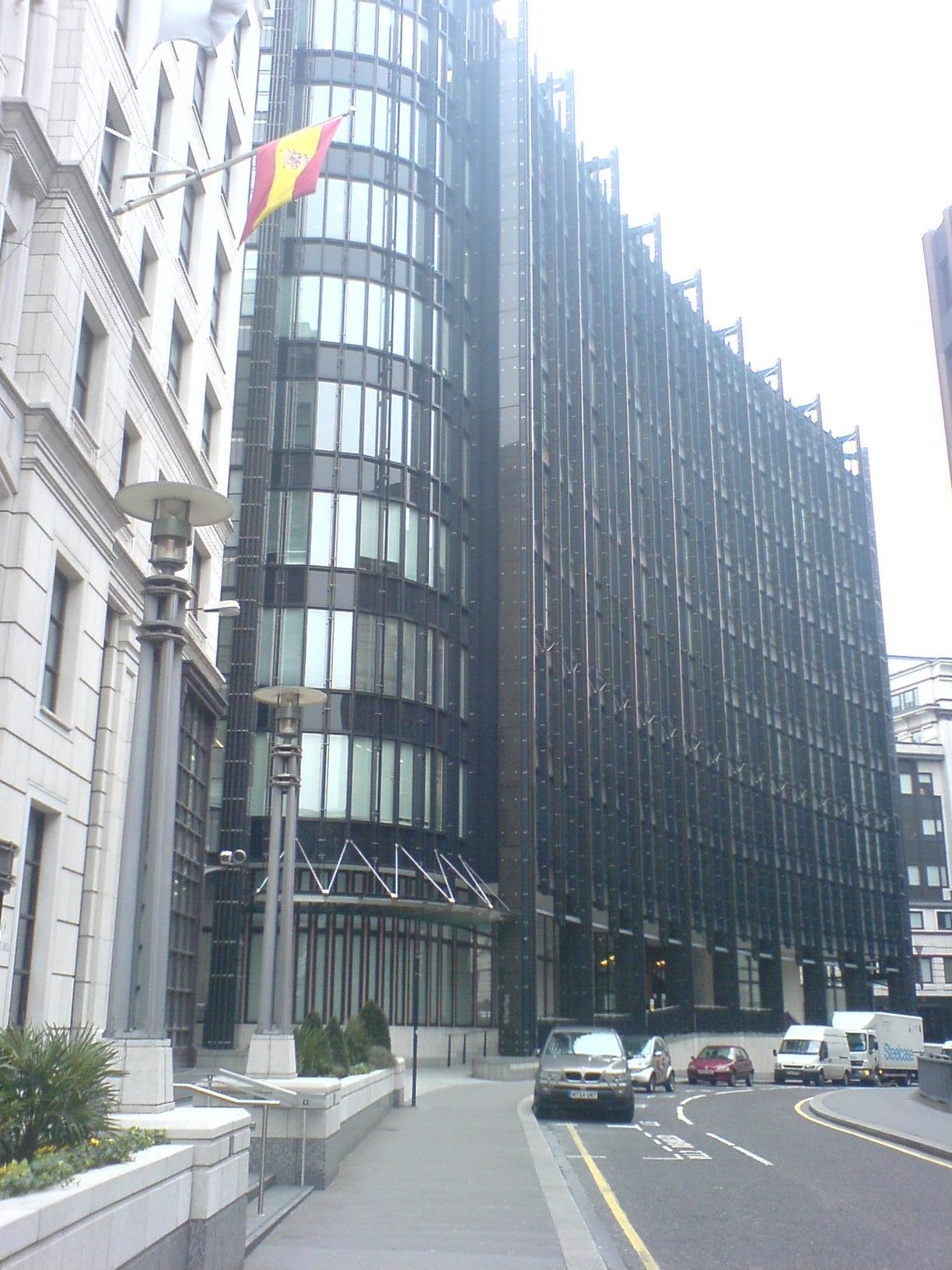
CNBC Europe headquarters in Fleet Place, London.

The following channels are not independent operational entities, but rather sub-regional services operated by CNBC Europe and Asia. They largely show identical programming to the main pan-regional feed, but operate a localised ticker relevant to that particular area and in some cases air area-specific advertising.

Channel	Parent	Headquarters	Notes
CNBC AU/NZ	CNBC Asia		Has some opt-out slots from pan-regional schedule for additional airings of Australian programming
CNBC Benelux	CNBC Europe		
CNBC Hong Kong	CNBC Asia	Hong Kong	
CNBC Nordic	CNBC Europe		Formerly aired some original programming
CNBC Singapore	CNBC Asia		
CNBC UK	CNBC Europe	London, England	Airs some local advertising and formerly aired some original programming

== Notes ==
^{A} Those channels in which Versant does not hold a stake are operated under a licensing agreement.
^{B} As CFN, later CFN/CNBC.
^{C} ^{E} Original launch date; merged with Dow Jones-owned competitors Asia Business News and European Business News in 1998.
^{D} ^{F} ^{H} Formerly co-owned with Dow Jones & Company.
^{G} As CNBC India.
^{I} Also airs some English-language programming from CNBC's international networks.
^{J} Identified on-air as Times Brasil, CNBC exclusive licensee due to this channel being only allowed by Versant to broadcast CNBC content instead of having a local version of the CNBC name
