= Camerton (band) =

Pop band from Mongolia

Camerton / Камертон / ᠺᠠᠮᠡᠷᠲᠤᠨ
- Origin: Ulaanbaatar, Mongolia
- Genres: Pop, soul, adult contemporary, R&B, hip hop
- Years active: 1995 – 2004, 2016 – present
- Members: Bold Dorjsuren; Erdenebat Batbayar; Mend-Amar Galbaatar; Gan-Erdene Lamjav

Camerton (Mongolian: Камертон, after the Russian word for tuning fork) is a Mongolian vocal group. They independently formed on June 24, 1995. The same year they won "Best Debut Group" at the Pentatonic Award, the biggest music awards in Mongolia.

Widely considered as the first and the most successful pop/boy band in Mongolia, Camerton have released a total of ten albums and EPs between 1996 and 2004. All four of the band's members were classmates since they were 6 years old at the Mongolian Music and Dance academy. And the band was born by the time they were 15 years old. At the peak of their success, the band's popularity spanned throughout East Asia, most notably in Taiwan, where they have exclusively released a "best of" compilation. Their song "Don't I think About You" has been included in an Asian All Stars' CD, named "Love is The Answer".

Following the release of "Celebration" EP in 2004, Camerton announced their hiatus. All four members of the group immediately went on to launch solo careers, most prominently Bold, who released several solo albums since 2005 and started a musical project named "Mongol Pop". The band occasionally reunites for one-time concerts and performances, most notable ones include their tenth and twentieth anniversary concerts in 2005 and 2015 respectively.

In January 2015, they released a brand new song called "Асах Гэрэл" (Asakh Gerel), a soundtrack for the film "Давхар Цохилт" (Davkhar Tsohilt), with a new music video. In November 2015, the band played another sold-out concert in Ulaanbaatar. The concert named '18 Years' (the original title of their debut concert in 1996) consisted of 40 songs. Following their hugely successful concert, Bold announced via his Facebook page that Camerton would be releasing a new album in 2016, the band's first release in more than a decade.

== Discography ==
- 18 нас (18 Years, 1995)
- Уйлахдаа ухаар (Uilakhdaa Ukhaar, 1998)
- Амин нутаг EP (Beloved Motherland, 1999)
- June 24 (2000)
- Retro II Remix (2000)
- Төгсөшгүй (Endless, 2001)
- Өнөөдөр (Today, 2003)
- Хайрын хот EP (City of Love, 2003)
- June 2004 (2004)
- Celebration EP (2004)
- Хязгааргүй EP (2017)
