= Haranga =

Mongolian hard rock/progressive rock band

Haranga / Харанга
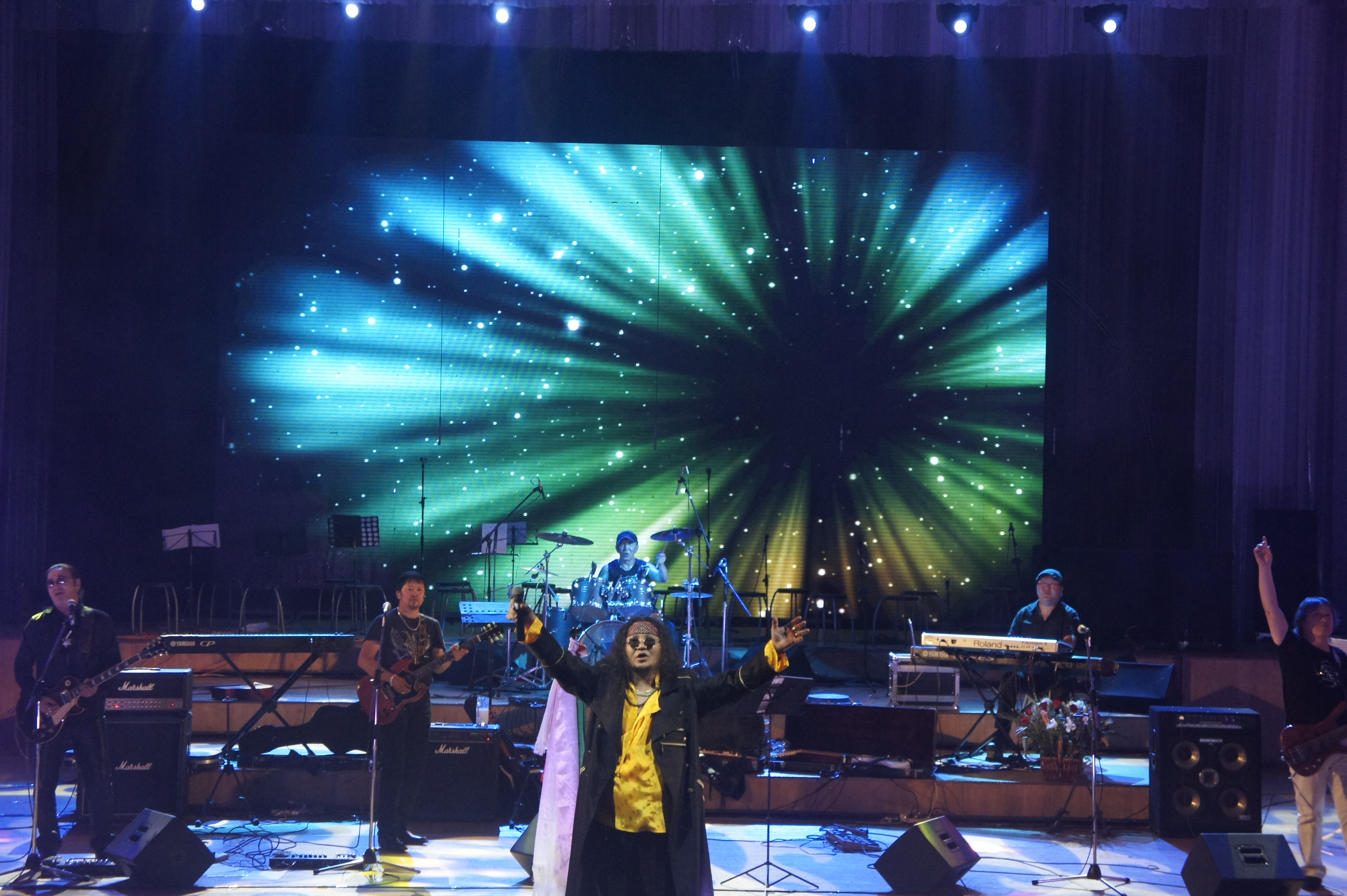
- 2013.07.14

Background information
- Origin: Mongolia
- Genres: Hard rock, Progressive rock
- Years active: 1989 – present
- Members: Khatanbaatar Lkhagvasuren; Tserendorj Chuluunbat; Tsendsuren Enkhmanlai; Yarinpil Odsuren; Nemekh Purevdash
- Past members: Khangal Bulgan

Haranga (Mongolian: Харанга, gong) is a hard rock/progressive rock band from Ulaanbaatar, Mongolia, established in 1989 as the first Mongolian hard rock group. It has been performing in Mongolia since the early 1990s. In 1997, the group recorded two CDs in Germany, sponsored by Daimler-Chrysler and Siemens Nixdorf.

== History ==
In the 1990s, their "Shuuder tsetseg" and "Uguilen sanana" became hits. And title name of "Only in Mongolia" became a popular quote in everyday life of Mongolia. They participated in Mongolian National TV's New Year's program "Tsenkher Delgets".

== Members ==
- Lkhagvasuren Khatanbaatar: vocal, trumpet /1989 - to present/
- Chuluunbat Tserendorj: bass, double-bass, vocal /1989 - to present/
- Enkhmanlai Tsendsuren: lead guitar, vocal /deceased/ /1989 - 2025/
- Odsuren Yarinpil: rhythm guitar, vocal /1989 - to present/
- Purevdash Nemekh: drums, percussion /1989 - to present/
- Bulgan Hangal: keyboards, accordion /deceased/ /1991 - 1999/

== Discography ==
- Эрин зууны хөг (The Sound of the Century 1997)
- Best of Haranga (1997)
- Бодлын тэнгис (Bodlyn Tengis, The Ocean of Thought, Unplugged, 2000)
- Ертөнцийн өнгө (Color of the World, 2003)
- Special Edition Gold (2007)
- Амьдрал-2 (Life-2)
