= Mongol HD TV =

Television channel of Mongolia

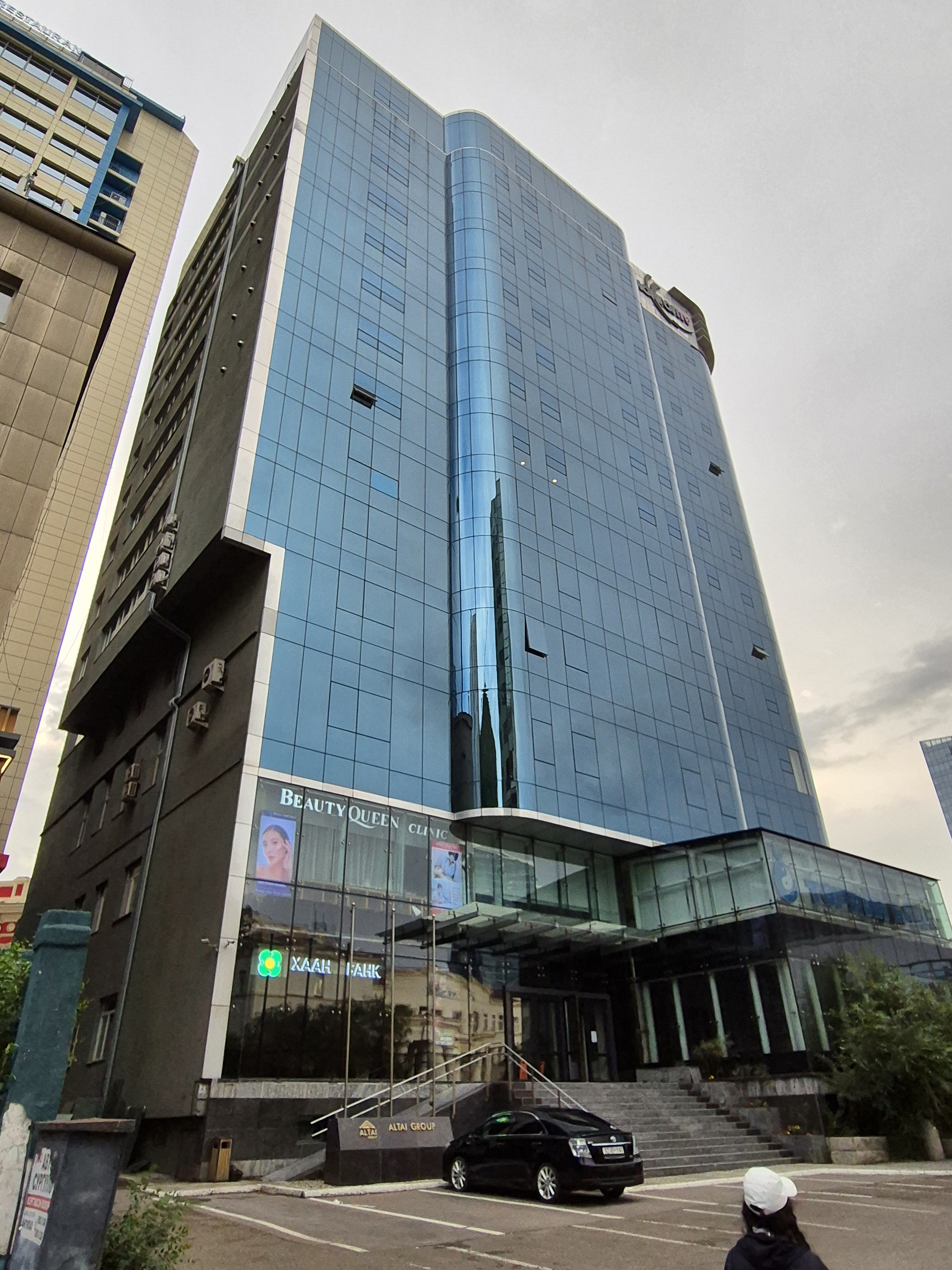
- Mongol TV Tower which houses the Mongol HD TV
- Country: Mongolia
- Headquarters: Ulaanbaatar

Ownership
- Owner: Chinbat Lkhagva

History
- Launched: 10 September 2009

Links
- Website: Official website

Mongol HD TV (Mongolian: Монгол HD телевиз) is a television broadcaster in Mongolia.

It was established in 2009 by Chinbat Lkhagva after the acquisition of a license for approximately US$402 million.

The channel also broadcasts popular shows such as, Mongolia's Got Talent, Shark Tank Mongolia, The Voice of Mongolia, Dancing with the Stars and The Apprentice Mongolia.

== See also ==
- Media of Mongolia
- Communications in Mongolia
