= Bold (singer) =

Mongolian singer, producer, and television personality

- Болд Доржсүрэн
- Born: Bold Dorjsuren; November 16, 1978 (age 47); Ulaanbaatar, Mongolia
- Occupations: Singer; Songwriter; television personality
- Years active: 1995-present
- Website: http://bproduction.mn

Bold Dorjsuren (born on November 16, 1978) is a Mongolian singer, producer, and television personality. He enrolled in “School of music and dance” in 1986 and he graduated as a professional violinist in 1996. He began his career as a member of a Mongolian boy band Camerton in 1995. in 2015, Bold started his solo music career with his debut album "Hairiin huch” in 2005. Since then he released twelve albums. He graduated “University of Art and Culture” as a professional singer in 2013. As of 2018, he has released more than 250 songs, and 12 albums under his record label B Production.

Bold was selected one of the four coaches of "The Voice of Mongolia" season one, along with Otgonbayar, Uka, and Ononbat. He also produced, and sang the show's anthem song "Gunig buhen bayartai".

== Discography ==
- Hairiin Huch (2006)
- 440 Hz (2006)
- Only One (2008)
- Amidraliin Gol Dur (2008)
- My Duets (2011)
- Mongol Pop (2011)
- Mongol Pop-2 (2012)
- Huvtsasaa taichaad shid (2014)
- BOLD (2018)
- Best of BOLD (2021)

== Television ==
- The Voice of Mongolia (season 1)
- The Voice of Mongolia (season 2)

== Awards and nominations ==
Award	Year	Recipient	Category	Result	Ref.
UBS Music Video Awards	2009	Bold for "Crazy fashion"	Best Music Video Producer	Won	
