= Uka (singer) =

Mongolian singer, actress, and TV personality

- Даваагийн Уламбаяр
- Born: Davaagiin Ulambayar; 6 November 1982 (age 43); Ulaanbaatar, Mongolia
- Occupations: Singer; actress; television personality
- Years active: 2004-present
- Height: 1.68 m (5 ft 6 in)
- Spouse: Erdenechuluun G.
- Children: 2

Davaagiin Ulambayar (Mongolian: Даваагийн Уламбаяр; born 6 November 1982), known professionally as Uka (Mongolian: Ука), is a Mongolian singer, actress, and TV personality. Born into a family of eight, she first gained attention as a member of a girl group "Kiwi" in 2004. With her trademark blonde hair, and unorthodox dance moves, she was often the face of the group. After her band went inactive in 2014, she pursued a solo career. She has since released four studio albums, "I am in love" (2015), "11.06" (2015), "Hug-Jim" (2017), and "Don't Stop" (2018).

Uka was one of the four judges in the first season of a Mongolian talent show, "The Voice of Mongolia", alongside Otgonbayar, Bold, and Ononbat. The eventual winner, Enguun Tseyendash, was selected from her team, "Team Uka".

Her single, "Don't Stop", was included in the "Asian Top Hip Hop" album in 2018. Uka is considered to be one of the most innovative modern artist in Mongolia.

== Life and career ==
=== 1982–2004: Early life and career beginnings ===
Uka was born as one of the six children into the family of Davaa and Zamand. As a child, she attended the 44th secondary school in Ulaanbaatar. She spent her summers at her grandma's summer house, and often squabbled with her sisters over who got to wear what. She attended and graduated from the "Mongolian Arts and Culture Academy". She has stated that one of her older sisters also attended the academy with her, and has a good singing voice, but never pursued a singing career.

After the academy, she joined a break-dancing group, named "Neg Khoroolol". During this time, she was infamous as a rather poor singer. Her dance-group members insisted that she attend "Nature Sound" studio's, then newly established, singing school. Upon graduation, she stayed at the school as a dance instructor. It is there, where she decided to join with Namuunaa and Enkhzol, forming the first iteration of "Kiwi".

=== 2004–2014: Kiwi ===
Kiwi was a personal project by Angirmaa B., a Mongolian producer and former singer. The group released 7 studio albums, and several DVD's. During its 10 year run, the group has had 6 different members. Uka and Namuunaa were the only permanent members. At the 10th annual Pentatonic awards, Kiwi was named the "Best Debut Band". Kiwi has had many singles which charted at the Mongolian billboards, including "Хүслээ хэлнэ", "Болдоггүй шүү", "Хайр хайраа өөрөө олдог", "Араас чинь тэврэлгүй явууллаа", and "Hot Line". Uka has attributed much of her success to the methods, and work ethic taught by Angirmaa.

=== 2014–present: Solo career ===
After Kiwi went inactive in 2014, she immediately sought to start her own solo career. Her first album, "I am in love", was released in 2015. Then "11.06" in 2015, "Khug-jim" in 2017, and her best album yet "Don't Stop" in 2018. From her latest album, the titular song "Don't Stop" was named as one of the best hip hop songs in Asia. As of April 2019, she is the second most viewed artist in Mongolia on YouTube, behind only the Korean girl group Blackpink, making her the most viewed Mongolian artist.

== Television ==
A Mongolian version of the show The Voice of Mongolia (season 1), was announced in late 2017. When later revealed, Uka was chosen as one of the four judges who will support its contestants throughout the series. Unique to the show, the judges not only judge the contestants, but also choose and recruit them into their own team, and personally train them to be a better artist. The show went on for four months, totaling eight episodes of blind auditions, and five more weeks of knockout stages. In the end, Enguun Tseyendash, a member of "Team Uka", was named the winner of the show.

Uka was cast in a movie, "Hi Honey", in January, 2018. The movie was released to the public on the 5th of April in theaters.

== Personal life ==
Uka is married to Erdenechuluun G, a mining businessman. Together they have 2 children. Her husband has appeared in the video for her song, "Gurvan Ugee Heleh uu".

== Discography ==
=== Studio albums ===
- I Am In love (2015)
- 11.06 (2015)
- Hug-Jim (2017)
- Don't Stop (2018)

=== Music videos ===
- "Margaashiin Nar Luu Hamt Ayalah uu"
- "DO IT"
- "Don't Stop" feat. DJ Zaya
- "Erh Chuluulnu"
- "Gurvan Ugee Heleh uu"
- "Gantsaardlaas Buu Ai"
- "Araas Min Tevreech"
- "Sahiulsan Tenger"
- "Muruudul Bid Hoyor"
- "Gerel Asaa"
- "Uul" feat. Degi
- "Hairtai Gej Heleech" feat. Luuya, Lil Thug E

== See also ==
- Kiwi (band)
- The Voice of Mongolia (season 1)
