= 1932 in comics =

Notable events of 1932 in comics.

== Events and publications ==
=== Year overall ===
- Rudolf Petersson creates 91:an.
- Lino Palacio creates Don Fulgencio.

=== January ===
- January 10: First publication of the Silly Symphony comic strip by Earl Duvall and Al Taliaferro, which also marks the debut of the character Bucky Bug.
- January 11: The first episode of Mickey Mouse and the Great Orphanage Robbery, by Floyd Gottrfedson, is published.
- January 10: Clarence D. Russell's Pete the Tramp makes its debut. It will run until 12 December 1963.

=== March ===
- March 6: The first episode of Roland Davies' Come On, Steve is published and will run until 1949.
- March 19: Carl Anderson's Henry makes its debut.
- March 20: In E.C. Segar's Thimble Theatre J. Wellington Wimpy first quotes his classic line: "I would gladly pay you Tuesday for a hamburger today."
- March: George Lichty's Grin and Bear It makes its debut. It will run until May 3, 2015.

=== May ===
- May 16: The first episode of Mickey Mouse sails for Treasure Island by Floyd Gottrfedson, is published.

=== June ===
- June 6: Clifford McBride's Napoleon and Uncle Elby makes its debut.

=== August ===
- August 14: Frederick Burr Opper's Happy Hooligan comes to an end after 32 years of syndication.

=== September ===
- September 8: In Dick Tracy, his future adoptive son Junior Tracy makes his debut.
- September 12: First appearance of Bluto and George W. Geezil in E.C. Segar's Thimble Theatre.
- September 18: First appearance of Morty and Ferdie Fieldmouse, the nephews of Mickey Mouse in Floyd Gottfreson's story Mickey’s nephews.
- September 25: The first issue of the Flemish comics magazine Ons Volkske is published.

=== October ===
- October 14: Frederick Burr Opper's comic strip And Her Name Was Maud comes to an end, after being in syndication since 1904.
- October 29: Walter Quermann's comic strip Toy Talkies makes its debut and will later change its title to Hickory Hollow Folks. It will run until 1955.

=== November ===
- November 12: The first episode of Floyd Gottfredson's Mickey Mouse story Blaggard Castle is published.

=== December ===
- December 5: V.T. Hamlin's Alley Oop makes its debut.
- December 5: Norman Pett's Jane makes its debut and will run until 10 October 1959.
- December 8: Hergé's Tintin story The Cigars of the Pharaoh starts in prepublication in Le Petit Vingtième. Halfway the story Tintin's nemesis Roberto Rastapopoulos and the bumbling police inspectors Thompson and Thomson make their debut.
- December 17: The first issue of the Italian comics magazine Jumbo is published. It will run until 13 November 1938. It's the first in Italy to use the balloons, instead of the traditional rhymed captions.
- December 31: The first issue of the Italian Disney comics magazine Topolino is published. It will run until 9 April 1949.

== Births ==
=== September ===
- September 3: Stelio Fenzo, Italian cartoonist, (d. 2022).
- September 22: Ian Kennedy, British comics artist (Dan Dare, Ro-Busters, Judge Dredd), (d. 2022).

== Deaths ==
=== April ===
- April 2: Loron A. Taylor, American comics artist (Mom 'n' Pop, worked on The Romance of America), commits suicide at age 32.

=== May ===
- May 21: Raoul Barré, Canadian animator and comics artist (Pour Un Dîner de Noël, En Roulant Ma Boule, Histoire de Sauvage, Les Contes du Père Rheault, Noahzark Hotel), dies at age 58 from cancer.

=== June ===
- June 14: Dok Hager, American comics artist (Dok's Dippy Duck, later retitled The Adventures of Waddles), dies at age 63.

=== August ===
- August 17: S. Carlisle Martin, American cartoonist and comics artist (continued Weatherbird), dies at age 54.

=== November ===
- November 17: George Frink, American comics artist (Circus Solly, Slim Jim and the Force), dies at age 68.
- Specific date in November unknown: Dart, A.K.A. Martin, British comic artist (Tich), dies in a car accident at an unknown age.

=== December ===
- December 28: Oscar Chopin, American comics artist (continued Weatherbird), dies at age 59.
