= Hird (disambiguation) =

The hird, in Scandinavian history, was a retinue of companions, that later developed into the royal court household.

Hird may also refer to:

- Hird (surname)
- Hirdman (surname)
- Hirden ('the hird'), a paramilitary organisation during the Nazi occupation of Norway

== See also ==
- Herd (disambiguation)
- Hurd (disambiguation)
- Heard (disambiguation)
