= Best Collection =

Best Collection may refer to:

== Literary Awards ==
- Best Collection, British Fantasy Award
- Best Collection, Forward Prizes for Poetry

== Music ==
- Best Collection (Toni Qattan album)
- Best Collection, album by Andy Hui 2005
- Best Collection I, 1993-1995 debut album of Mongolian heavy metal band Hurd, from Hurd discography
- Best Collection II, Unplugged (1995-1999) Hurd (band)
- Coquillage: The Best Collection II Kokia's second greatest hits album 2009
- Best Collection, Teddy Afro
