= Dan Martin (cartoonist) =

American cartoonist

Dan Martin is a 20th and 21st century American cartoonist.

Martin, a St. Louis native, was graduated from Lindbergh High School. At age 16, He worked at Six Flags Over Mid-America as caricaturist. He joined the St. Louis Post-Dispatch in 1980 out of the University of Kansas.

Martin draws the Weatherbird for the Post-Dispatch. He is the sixth cartoonist to draw the Weatherbird, which debuted in 1901 and appears every day on the paper's front page. He is the second-longest serving Weatherbird artist (after Amadee Wohlschlaeger), having taken over the strip in 1986. "Albert Schweitzer, who was drawing the Bird at the time, told me he was planning to retire" Martin said. "After I had practiced for about a year, we took 10 Weatherbird drawings of mine mixed in with 10 of Albert’s and showed them to editor Bill Woo, who couldn’t tell the difference... So I got the job."

In 1987, Martin eliminated the cigar which had been emblematic of the character since its inception, He also restored the bird's beak to some degree (previous Weatherbird cartoonists had atrophied the beak to the point of a flat-faced Weatherbird). It usually takes Martin about 45 minutes to create a Weatherbird cartoon.

Martin also drew the weekly cartoon "Postcard From Mound City" for the Post-Dispatch editorial page ("Mound City" is a nickname for St. Louis, based on the nearby Cahokia Mounds).

Martin went into semi-retirement in 2023. He still draws the Weatherbird, but gave up additional cartooning duties.

== Works ==
- Martin, Dan (2001). The Story of the First 100 Years of the St. Louis Post-Dispatch Weatherbird: The Oldest Continuously Running Daily Cartoon in American Journalism. Virginia Publishing. ISBN 978-1891442155.
- Martin, Dan (2008). See You in the Funny Papers: The Rich Tradition of St. Louis Cartooning. Reedy Press. ISBN 978-1933370279.
