= Albert Schweitzer (disambiguation) =

Albert Schweitzer most commonly refers to the German-French theologian and philosopher (1875–1965).

Albert Schweitzer may also refer to:

- Albert Schweitzer (artist), American artist (1921–2023)
- Albert Schweitzer (film), 1957 film about the theologian
- Albert Schweitzer (train), train named after the theologian
- Albert Schweitzer (2009 film), see Template:Gavin Millar
