= Uuhai =

Mongolian folk metal band

- Origin: Ulaanbaatar, Mongolia
- Genres: Folk metal
- Years active: 2020–present
- Label: Napalm Records
- Members: Otgonbaatar Damba; Khurtsgerel Damiranjav; Zorigoo Battsooj; Saruul Tsogt-Erdene; Batbayar Dulamsuren; Dalaitseren Nasanbuyan; Anand Naranbaatar

Uuhai is a Mongolian folk metal band formed in 2020. They are known for incorporating traditional Mongolian music with heavy metal.

== History ==
Uuhai was formed in Ulaanbaatar, Mongolia in 2020 by Otgonbaatar Damba, a member of the heavy metal band Hurd. The name Uuhai, which means "Hoorah" in English, refers to deep cultural traditions, as "shouting ‘uuhai' in unison which has roots as a spiritual mantra as a sign of goodwill leading to good fortune and had been used as a way of releasing energy, emboldening one’s spirits and stimulating the elements of one’s body." In 2022, Uuhai released their first music videos for the songs "Khun Sureg", "Ser Ser" and their self-titled song, the latter which features the band Hurd. In 2023, the band toured Europe for the first time, starting with a concert in Paris in June.

On 6 November 2025, Uuhai announced they signed with Napalm Records, their debut studio album Human Herds and released its lead eponymous lead single "Uuhai". On 4 December, the band released the album's second single "Khar Khulz". On 6 January, they released the third single from the album "Secret History of the Mongols".

== Members ==
- Otgonbaatar Damba – drums (2020–present)
- Khurtsgerel Damiranjav – horsehead fiddle, throat singing (2020–present)
- Zorigoo Battsooj – horsehead fiddle, throat singing (2020–present)
- Saruul Tsogt-Erdene – vocals (2020–present)
- Batbayar Dulamsuren – percussion (2020–present)
- Dalaitseren Nasanbuyan – guitar (2020–present)
- Anand Naranbaatar – bass guitar (2020–present)

== Discography ==
=== Studio albums ===
List of studio albums, showing selected details
Title	Details
Human Herds	Released: 9 January 2026; Label: Napalm Records; Formats: CD, digital download, streaming, Vinyl

=== Singles ===
Title	Year	Album
"Uuhai"	2025	Human Herds
"Khar Khulz"	2025	Human Herds
"Secret History of the Mongols"	2026	Human Herds
