= Hurd (disambiguation) =

GNU Hurd or Hurd, is a Unix-like kernel that sets the base for the GNU operating system.

Hurd may also refer to:

== Places ==
- Hurd Peninsula, in the South Shetland Islands
- Hurd's Deep, submarine valley in the English Channel
- Hurds Lake, Ontario
- Hurds Pond, a lake in Maine
- Renfrew/Hurds Lake Water Aerodrome, also called Hurds Lake Water Aerodrome, in Ontario, Canada

== Other uses ==
- Hurd (band), a Mongolian heavy metal band
- Hurd (surname)
- Hemp hurd, the left-over fragments of hemp stems and stalk after removal of fibers
- "The Hurds", or "Odds and Ends", a German fairy tale collected by the Brothers Grimm

== See also ==
- Herd (disambiguation)
- Heard (disambiguation)
- Hird (disambiguation)
- Hurdy-gurdy
