= Herd (disambiguation) =

A herd is a social group of certain animals of the same species.

Herd may also refer to:

- Herding, bringing individual animals together into a group
- Herd (surname), including a list of people with the name
- Herd (2016 film), a Serbian comedy
- Herd (2023 film), an American horror film
- Herd, a 1999 short film directed by Mike Mitchell

== See also ==
- The Herd (disambiguation)
- Herding cats (disambiguation)
- Heard (disambiguation)
- Hird (disambiguation)
- Hurd (disambiguation)
- Bachelor herd, a herd of juvenile male animals who are still sexually immature
- Crowd control, a public security practice
- Collective animal behavior
- Herd behavior, the behavior of individuals in a group acting collectively without centralized direction
- Herding dog, trained in herding livestock or of a breed developed for herding
- List of animal names, including collective nouns such as "herd"
- Sheepdog trial, competitive sport involving dogs working herds of sheep
