= Hird (surname) =

Hird is a surname. Notable people with the surname include:

- Allan Hird (disambiguation), multiple people
- Harold Hird (born 1942), Australian politician
- Harry Hird (1896–1974), English footballer
- James Hird (born 1973), Australian rules footballer
- Marita Hird (born 1971), Australian equestrian
- Thora Hird (1911–2003), English actress and comedian of stage and screen, presenter and writer
