= S. Carlisle Martin =

American cartoonist

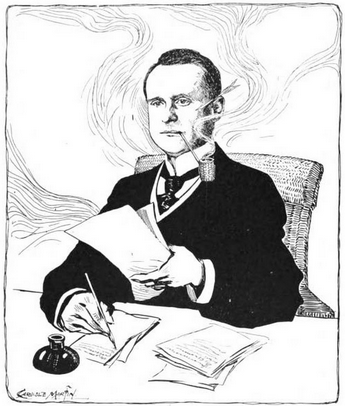
A 1904 illustration by Martin: "Pipe Dream", illustrating the poem "The Missouri Meerschaum" (a corncob pipe) for the Baltimore and Ohio Railroad's passenger magazine

Samuel Carlisle Martin (1867–1932) was an American newspaper cartoonist and illustrator.

Martin was born in St. Louis on November 13, 1867, to John and Hattie Martin; John Martin was railroad agent. Martin had a twin brother (who also became a newspaper illustrator) and other siblings. He attended the St. Louis School of Fine Arts at Washington University.

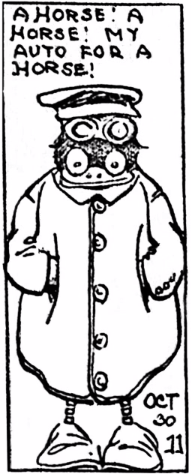
Martin's Weatherbird of October 30, 1911

Martin was an illustrator for the St. Louis Post-Dispatch and was the third cartoonist to draw that paper's Weatherbird, taking over from Oscar Chopin. He drew the strip (which continues to this day) from 1910 to 1932. Martin began the practice of having the Weatherbird comment on current events, and set the standards of six words maximum for the "birdline" (the Weatherbird's comments).

Assisted by reporter Carlos Hurd (who helped write the birdlines), Martin drew the Weatherbird until his death. He was succeeded by Amadee Wohlschlaeger (then just out of his teens), who went on to draw the strip for a half century.

== Personal life and death ==
Martin married Lynn Shackleford on October 30, 1897. They had a son, Samuel Jr., and a daughter. Martin died on August 17, 1932, in St. Louis.
