= Hurd discography =

Mongolian heavy metal band discography

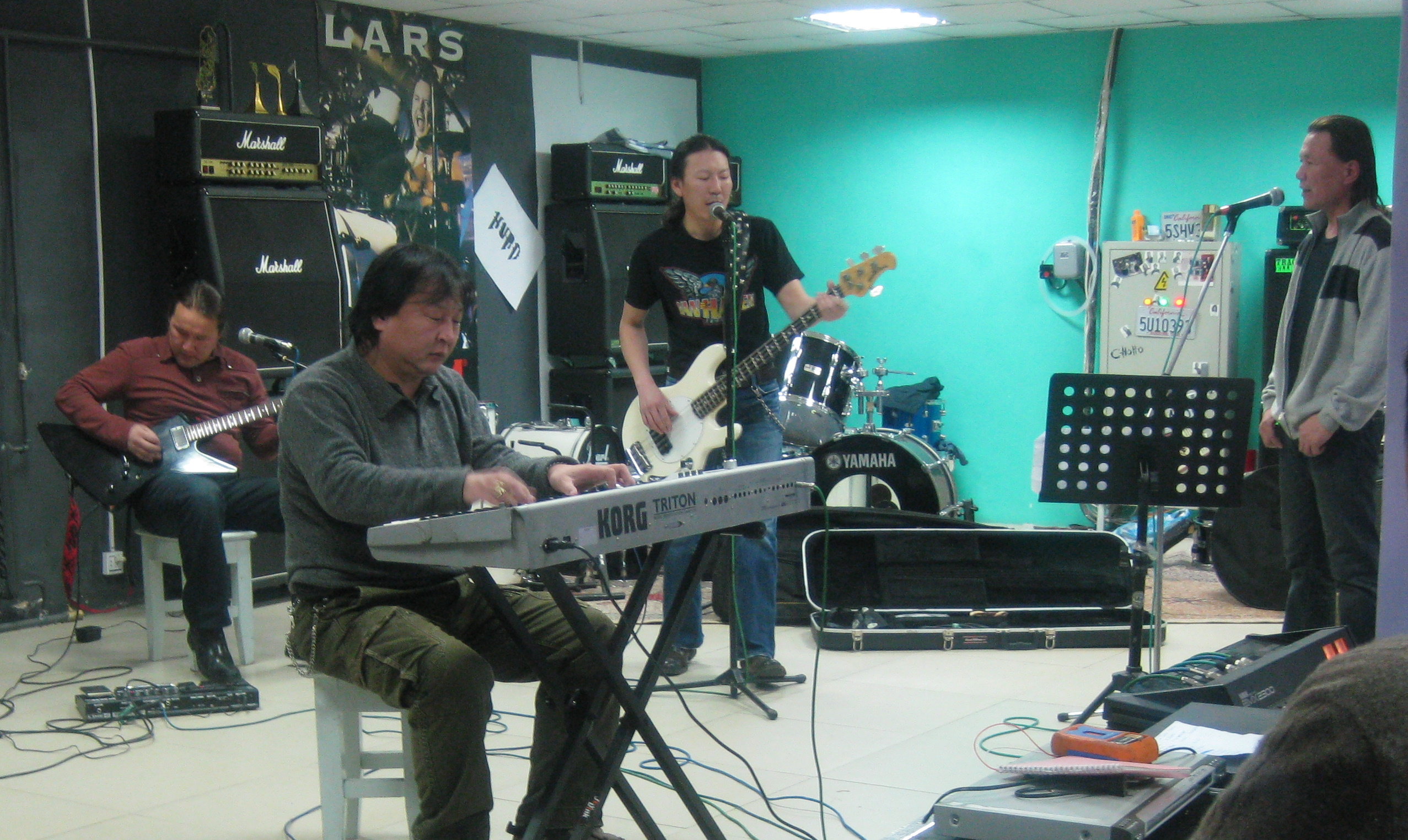
- Hurd rehearsing in their Ulan Bator studio in 2009. From left to right : D.Otgonbayar, D.Ganbayar, N.Naranbaatar, D.Tömörtsog.
- Studio albums: 9
- Live albums: 1
- Compilation albums: 1
- Video albums: 2
- Box sets: 1

This is a discography of the Mongolian heavy metal band Hurd.

== Studio albums ==
=== The Best Collection I ===
The Best Collection I

Studio album by Hurd
- Released: 1997
- Recorded: 1993–1995, Sonor Studio, Ulan Bator, Mongolia
- Genre: Heavy metal
- Length: 62:15

The Best Collection I is Hurd's debut album. Recorded between the years of 1993–1995, and released along with The Best Collection II, it is considered to be one of the first heavy metal albums in Mongolian music history. It contains such hit songs as Chimeegüi irekh durlal, Saikhan büsgüi and Eejdee, which are hugely popular among Mongolian music lovers, and are frequently included in the live set.

5 songs from The Best Collection I were re-arranged and played acoustically during the 1998 Unplugged concert.

Hurd released their first music video for Chono, where the band is seen playing the song near an abandoned factory. It also contains numerous battle scenes from a 1945 movie about Tsogt Taij. It is told that the band members grew quickly tired and behaved impatiently during the filming, as they were not yet familiar with the process.

Mongolian traditional music instruments were used for the recording of Bakharkhal, most notably the Morin khuur. This song is among the first in a long list of patriotic songs written by Hurd.

Track listing

No.	Title	Lyrics	Music	Transliterated title	Length
1.	"Чоно"	Kh.Lkhagvasuren	Dambyn Ganbayar	Chono	4:51
2.	"Алив бос"	R.Mönkhsaikhan	D.Ganbayar	Aliv bos	4:42
3.	"Нар сар"	L.Enkh-Amgalan	T.Naranbaatar	Nar sar	5:29
4.	"Чимээгүй ирэх дурлал"	N.Khongor	Dambyn Otgonbayar	Chimeegüi irekh durlal	3:39
5.	"Сэрүүн бухимдал"	P.Kherlen	D.Otgonbayar	Serüün bukhimdal	7:49
6.	"Залуу нас"	B.Luvsanjurmed	D.Otgonbayar	Zaluu nas	4:31
7.	"Эх орны төлөө"	L.Tümürbat	D.Otgonbayar	Ekh orny tölöö	6:33
8.	"Сайхан бүсгүй"	Kh.Davaadash	Sangaagiin Ishkhüü, D.Otgonbayar	Saikhan büsgüi	4:54
9.	"Өөрийгөө би"	L.Enkh-Amgalan	T.Naranbaatar	Ööriigöö bi	3:54
10.	"Ээждээ"	D.Boldbaatar	S.Ishkhüü, Namsraijavyn Naranbaatar	Eejdee	4:25
11.	"Бахархал"	A.Zandangarav	D.Ganbayar	Bakharkhal	6:23
12.	"Шартаж үхлээ"	B.Galsansukh	D.Otgonbayar	Shartaj ükhlee	5:05

Additional personnel

- S.Ishkhüü - keyboards
- Kh.Bayarbold - technician
- A.Bayarmagnai - technician

=== The Best Collection II ===
The Best Collection II

Studio album by Hurd
- Released: 1997
- Recorded: 1993–1995, Sonor Studio, Ulan Bator, Mongolia
- Genre: Heavy metal
- Length: 59:27

The Best Collection II is Hurd's second studio album. It was recorded and released in conjunction with The Best Collection I, and as a result the two albums are sometimes seen together as a double album.

Compared to its counterpart, the style and lyrical theme of The Best Collection II is somewhat darker (dealing with night, darkness, fear, cemetery, ...), and the songs are rather fast-paced, with Khar darsan züüd being one of the fastest songs in Hurd's repertoire.

The hugely successful Tsergiin bodol ("Soldier's Thoughts") is considered a classic and allowed the band to reach celebrity. The song was written by Dambyn Ganbold, the older brother of founder Ganbayar, in 1978, while he was in military service, his fellow soldiers helping him up on the lyrics. It is told that, during a performance in an all-star concert, Hurd had a 3-song setlist that included Tsergiin bodol, but under popular demand they ended up playing the song three times in a row. Other famous songs from the album include Baga nas, Zurag shig büsgüi and Nulimsaa tevch'ye.

Hurd's 1998 Unplugged acoustic concert includes no less than 8 songs from The Best Collection II.

Track listing

No.	Title	Lyrics	Music	Transliterated title	Length
1.	"Болтугай"	N.Chuluunbaatar	Dambyn Otgonbaatar	Boltugai	4:05
2.	"Хар дарсан зүүд"	R.Mönkhsaikhan	D.Ganbayar	Khar darsan züüd	3:59
3.	"Сохор номин"	P.Kherlen	D.Otgonbayar	Sokhor nomin	4:17
4.	"Бага нас"	T.Bat-orgil	D.Otgonbayar	Baga nas	6:38
5.	"Цэргийн бодол"	D.Ganbold	D.Ganbold	Tsergiin bodol	4:40
6.	"Хэрээ мэд"	B.Luvsanjurmed	D.Otgonbayar	Kheree med	3:51
7.	"Харанхуй"	D.Banzragch	D.Otgonbayar	Kharankhui	4:20
8.	"Зураг шиг бүсгүй"	D.Amgalan, D.Otgonbaatar	S.Ishkhüü, D.Otgonbayar	Zurag shig büsgüi	4:40
9.	"Миний дайсан"	B.Luvsanjurmed	D.Otgonbayar	Minii daisan	3:34
10.	"Нулимсаа тэвчье"	S.Ishkhüü	D.Otgonbayar	Nulimsaa tevch'ye	5:18
11.	"Булш"	P.Kherlen	D.Otgonbayar	Bulsh	6:27
12.	"Миний Монгол"	B.Galsansükh	D.Ganbayar	Minii Mongol	4:01
13.	"Шөнө"	Sh.Mönkhbat	D.Ganbayar	Shönö	3:37

Additional personnel

- S.Ishkhüü - keyboards
- Kh.Bayarbold - technician
- A.Bayarmagnai - technician

=== Ödör Shönö ===
Ödör Shönö Өдөр шөнө

Studio album by Hurd
- Released: 1999
- Recorded: 1998–1999, Ulan Bator, Mongolia ("Tanygaa dursana" intro recorded 1978)
- Genre: Heavy metal
- Length: 71:45

Ödör Shönö (Mongolian: Өдөр шөнө, "day and night") is Hurd's third studio album.

It is the only album where the band has changed its name to "Erel-Hurd", the album being the beginning of their 8-year partnership with Erel company. The name "Erel-Hurd" also appears on the compilation cassette Shildeg duu from the era.

Tanygaa dursana was written by D. Ganbold, the older brother of Hurd founder Ganbayar, who also authored the hugely successful Tsergiin bodol from The Best Collection II. The track contains a recording from 1978 of Ganbold singing Tsergiin bodol.

Süns zalrakhui was not listed on the original release of the album, leading fans to give it the title Önö ertnii uyees (Өнө эртний үеэс), based on the chorus of the song, before the release of the Black Box boxset in 2013, where the official name of the song was finally revealed. On the original 1999 release, the track was track 4, but it was moved to the end of the album on the Black Box and the 30th anniversary reissue.

Track listing

No.	Title	Lyrics	Music	Transliterated title	Length
1.	"Дүлий хорвоо"	T.Erdenetsogt	D.Otgonbayar	Dülii khorvoo	3:54
2.	"Гүйдэлтэй газар"	J.Batsükh	D.Otgonbayar	Güideltei gazar	3:55
3.	"Чи минь байгаа болхоор"	Sh.Jargalsaikhan	D.Otgonbayar	Chi min' baigaa bolkhoor	4:12
4.	"Сүнс залрахуй" (Moved to the end of the album on all reissues since the Black Box)	D.Ganbayar	D.Ganbayar	Süns zalrakhui	4:54
5.	"Хоёулаа үгүй"	T.Erdenetsogt	D.Otgonbayar	Khoyulaa ügüi	3:39
6.	"Жаргалтай нүдэнд нулимс зохихгүй"	D.Otgonbayar	D.Otgonbayar	Jargaltai nüdend nulims zokhikhgüi	3:23
7.	"Аян замд"	T.Erdenetsogt	D.Otgonbayar	Ayan zamd	5:23
8.	"Ээж минь"	D.Otgonbaatar	D.Otgonbaatar	Eej min'	4:55
9.	"Цагаан шонхор"	B.Galsansükh	D.Ganbayar	Tsagaan shonkhor	5:13
10.	"Тэр цаг"	P.Kherlen	D.Otgonbayar	Ter tsag	4:27
11.	"Уур хилэн"	D.Otgonbaatar	D.Otgonbayar	Uur khilen	5:03
12.	"Аавдаа би хайртай"	I.Chilaajav	S.Ishkhüü	Aavdaa bi khairtai	5:16
13.	"Өдөр шөнө"	D.Otgonbaatar	D.Otgonbaatar	Ödör shönö	4:05
14.	"Ханьдаа дуулъя"	R.Gerel	D.Otgonbayar	Khan'daa duulya	4:46
15.	"Таныгаа дурсана"	D.Ganbold	D.Ganbold	Tanygaa dursana	4:24
16.	"Урагшаа"	B.Luvsanjurmed	N.Naranbaatar	Uragshaa	3:56

=== Myangan Jild Gants ===
Myangan Jild Gants Мянган жилд ганц

Studio album by Hurd
- Released: 2001
- Recorded: 1993, 1998, 2001, Chugu, RITM and Sonor Studios, Ulan Bator, Mongolia
- Genres: Heavy metal, Nu metal
- Length: 72:02

Myangan Jild Gants (Mongolian: Мянган жилд ганц, "once in a thousand years") is Hurd's fourth studio album.

In this album, besides their usual rock ballads and heavy metal songs, Hurd has made their first attempts of writing nu metal material. That can be attested by such songs as Üg sons or Gar utas, as some of the singing is rapped and there is some use of turntables. Hurd would continue the rap rock theme on their song "Sain muu", on the followup album Mongold Törsön.

Khelekh n' khegjüün is the fastest and also the shortest song in all of Hurd's catalog. Shine jil is an outtake from the Best Collection sessions and previously appeared on The Best Collection 3.

Track listing

No.	Title	Lyrics	Music	Transliterated title	Length
1.	"Хүн"	Bayandalai	D.Otgonbayar	Khün	4:31
2.	"Атаархал"	Bayandalai	D.Otgonbayar	Ataarkhal	5:54
3.	"Бүсгүй"	Kh.Chilaajav	S.Ishkhüü	Büsgüi	5:00
4.	"Өнгөрсөн шөнө"		D.Ganbayar	Öngörsön shönö	4:15
5.	"Та"	Sumya	D.Otgonbayar	Ta	5:08
6.	"Чамайгаа үнсье"	Khishigjargal	D.Otgonbayar	Chamaigaa üns'ye	3:41
7.	"13-н ааш"	Sumya	D.Otgonbayar	13-n aash	4:33
8.	"Үг сонс"		D.Otgonbaatar	Üg sons	4:42
9.	"Очиж чадаагүй"	Gerel	D.Ganbayar	Ochij chadaagüi	4:25
10.	"Яалаа ийлээ"	Kh.Chilaajav	T.Naranbaatar	Yaalaa iilee	4:25
11.	"Шинэ жил"	Kh.Chilaajav	D.Otgonbayar	Shine jil	4:08
12.	"Санаж байна"		S.Ishkhüü	Sanaj baina	5:20
13.	"Ганцаардал"	Sumya	D.Otgonbayar	Gantsaardal	4:52
14.	"Гар утас"	Kh.Chilaajav	D.Otgonbayar	Gar utas	3:43
15.	"Үнэгүй юм"	Bayandalai	D.Otgonbayar	Ünegüi yum	5:16
16.	"Хэлэх нь хэгжүүн"	Sumya	D.Otgonbayar	Khelekh n' khegjüün	2:09

Additional personnel

- Kh.Nergüi - engineering, mixing
- Kh.Bayarbold - technician
- B.Batbayar - technician
- B.Bat-Erdene - technician
- N.Byambadorj - technician

=== Mongold Törsön ===
Mongold Törsön Монголд төрсөн

Studio album by Hurd
- Released: 2004
- Recorded: 2003, Ulan Bator, Mongolia
- Genres: Hard rock, Rock and roll
- Length: 70:56; 75:49 (Black Box version)

Mongold Törsön (Mongolian: Монголд төрсөн, "born in Mongolia") is Hurd's fifth studio album.

According to the band's comments in the Enhanced CD section, they wanted to make a softer sounding album and try out different rock music genres. For the first time, Hurd has written songs in rock and roll style. Also notable is the collaboration with hip-hop artists Ice Top, Digital and 2 Khüü on Sain muu. Nutag min' ünertdeg features two famous Mongolian wrestling champions G. Ösökhbayar and D. Mönkh-Erdene.

The band also comments that Mongold Törsön was specially dedicated to all the Mongolians living abroad. Indeed, the overarching theme of the album is family, homeland, and national pride.

In 2004, Hurd's tour supporting Mongold Törsön in Inner Mongolia was cancelled, as reportedly the Chinese authorities feared civil unrest.

The song Rock n' roll was later retitled to Namaig toogoogüi büsgüid bayar khürgeye (Намайг тоогоогүй бүсгүйд баяр хүргэе).

Track listing

No.	Title	Lyrics	Music	Transliterated title	Length
1.	"Монголд төрсөн юм"	P.Kherlen	D.Otgonbayar	Mongold törsön yum	4:31
2.	"Нулимс дуслахгүй хайр"	D.Chimgee, P.Kherlen	D.Otgonbaatar	Nulims duslakhgüi khair	4:49
3.	"Хүлээсэн сэтгэл"	P.Enkhbaatar	S.Ishkhüü	Khüleesen setgel	4:54
4.	"Даанч дэндүү"	Kh.Chilaajav	D.Otgonbayar	Daanch dendüü	4:12
5.	"Хайрын сарнай"	Sh.Gürbazar, J.Batsükh	D.Otgonbayar	Khairyn sarnai	4:22
6.	"Бүүвэй аялна"	Sh.Gürbazar	L.Balkhjav	Büüvei ayalna	5:19
7.	"Rock n' roll"	Kh.Chilaajav	T.Naranbaatar		4:11
8.	"Хүү нь гомдоогүй"	Sh.Gürbazar	L.Balkhjav	Khüü n' gomdoogüi	6:16
9.	"Нутаг минь үнэртдэг" (featuring G.Ösökhbayar and D.Mönkh-Erdene)	J.Mönkhbat	B.Ganbold	Nutag min' ünertdeg	4:18
10.	"Би дурлаж байна"	Sh.Gürbazar	D.Otgonbayar	Bi durlaj baina	3:50
11.	"Ээж хайрхан"		D.Otgonbayar	Eej khairkhan	5:07
12.	"Сайн муу" (featuring Ice Top, Digital and 2 Khuu)	Ice Top, Digital, 2 Khuu	D.Otgonbayar	Sain muu	4:25
13.	"Харуусал"	S.Erdene	S.Ishkhüü	Kharuusal	5:31
14.	"Хэзээ ч битгий"	P.Kherlen	D.Otgonbaatar	Khezee ch bitgii	4:41
15.	"Манайд ирээрэй" (Not on the original album despite being listed, only appears on the Black Box reissue)	G.Mend-Ooyoo	R.Enkhbazar	Manaid ireerei	4:22
16.	"Монголоороо гоёдог"	Sh.Gürbazar	D.Otgonbayar	Mongolooroo goyodog	4:31

=== Züirlekh Argagüi ===
Züirlekh Argagüi Зүйрлэх аргагүй

Studio album by Hurd
- Released: 2005
- Recorded: 2004, RITM Studio, Ulan Bator, Mongolia
- Genres: Heavy metal, Rock and roll
- Length: 76:12

Züirlekh Argagüi (Mongolian: Зүйрлэх аргагүй, "uncomparable") is Hurd's sixth studio album.

Track listing

No.	Title	Lyrics	Music	Transliterated title	Length
1.	"Алаг нүдэн"	T.Erdenetsogt	D.Otgonbaatar	Alag nüden	3:56
2.	"Энд нэг л биш ээ"	B.Oidov	D.Otgonbayar	End neg l bish ee	3:05
3.	"Яг л чам шиг"	Sükhzorig	D.Otgonbayar	Yag l cham shig	5:48
4.	"Зэвүүн харц"	B.Oidov, P.Kherlen	D.Otgonbaatar	Zevüün kharts	4:16
5.	"Алт"	B.Oidov	D.Otgonbaatar	Alt	4:33
6.	"Зөрөөд өнгөрсөн бүсгүй"		D.Otgonbayar	Zörööd öngörsön büsgüi	4:31
7.	"Намуухан орчлон"	T.Erdenetsogt	D.Otgonbayar	Namuukhan orchlon	5:36
8.	"Ер бусын сүм"	T.Erdenetsogt	D.Otgonbaatar	Yer busyn süm	4:03
9.	"Би дуртай"	Ts.Khulan	D.Otgonbaatar	Bi durtai	4:41
10.	"Цоглог оюутан"	B.Oidov	D.Otgonbayar	Tsoglog oyutan	4:10
11.	"Би амьдарч чадна"	B.Oidov	D.Otgonbayar	Bi am'darch chadna	5:04
12.	"Тоотой санагдах юм"	Kh.Purev	S.Ishkhüü	Tootoi sanagdakh yum	6:46
13.	"Зүйрлэх аргагүй"	Kh.Chilaajav	D.Otgonbayar	Züirlekh argagüi	4:03
14.	"Нүүдлийн кино театр"	B.Oidov	D.Otgonbayar	Nüüdliin kino teatr	5:22
15.	"Хонгор сэтгэл"	B.Bayandalai	D.Otgonbayar	Khongor setgel	5:32
16.	"Хөгшин атаман"	B.Oidov	D.Otgonbaatar	Khögshin ataman	4:46

Additional personnel

- D.Lkhagvaa - technician
- N.Bondoo - technician

=== Khairyn Salkhi ===
Khairyn Salkhi Хайрын салхи

Studio album by Hurd
- Released: 2013 (with Black Box boxset)
- Recorded: 2009–2010, Ulan Bator, Mongolia
- Genres: Hard rock, Rock and roll
- Length: 53:53

In November 2009, the band has announced through their official website the upcoming release of their seventh studio album, Khairyn Salkhi (Mongolian: Хайрын салхи, "wind of love").

The album took 1 year to be finished and contains 12 songs that revolve around the theme of love. Its cover was uploaded, but only a few homemade cassette and CD-R copies of the album circulated. At least one (semi-)official silver CD pressing was done in Inner Mongolia, although it is very rare and the only copy located does not have any identifying marks on it. The album was finally given an official release in 2013 in the Black Box boxset.

The songs Nogoon shugüi and Chamaig zorino date back to at least 1998, being recorded at the concert at Top Ten nightclub in Ulaanbaatar that was immortalised on the 1999 album Unplugged. On the initial tape copies, Nogoon shugüi was labeled as Durlaj üzsengüi.

Track listing

No.	Title	Transliterated title	Length
1.	"Зүүд биелэх болов уу"	Züüd biyelekh bolov uu	4:28
2.	"Хайрын салхи"	Khairyn salkhi	4:14
3.	"Хагдрах цэцэг"	Khagdrakh tsetseg	5:30
4.	"Тансаг гоо бүсгүй"	Tansag goo büsgüi	3:38
5.	"Хайрын нулимс"	Khairyn nulims	4:59
6.	"Эндүүрэл"	Endüürel	3:59
7.	"Тавилан"	Tavilan	3:38
8.	"Чамайг зорино"	Chamaig zorino	5:08
9.	"Ногоон шугүй"	Nogoon shugüi	3:48
10.	"Дурлалд битгий яар"	Durlald bitgii yaar	4:58
11.	"Нэг ангийнхан"	Neg angiinkhan	5:22
12.	"Амьдаръя"	Am'dar"ya	3:57

=== Narlag Divaajin ===
Narlag Divaajin Нарлаг диваажин

Studio album by Hurd
- Released: 2016
- Recorded: 2014, Ulan Bator, Mongolia
- Genres: Hard rock, Rock and roll
- Length: 83:48

Narlag Divaajin (Mongolian: Нарлаг диваажин, "sunny paradise") is Hurd's eighth studio album, released as a double album in 2016.

Track listing

Disc one
No.	Title	Lyrics	Music	Transliterated title	Length
1.	"Монгол"	B.Gankhürel	Dambyn Otgonbayar	Mongol	5:33
2.	"Сануулсаар байтал"	B.Boldsaikhan	D.Otgonbayar	Sanuulsaar baital	4:14
3.	"Нандин хайр"	B.Gankhürel, Luvsanravdan	D.Otgonbayar	Nandin khair	4:41
4.	"Сэмэрч нураагүй"	B.Gankhürel	Sangaagiin Ishkhüü	Semerch nuraagüi	3:49
5.	"Нарлаг диваажин"	P.Kherlen	D.Otgonbayar	Narlag divaajin	5:40
6.	"Яарсангүй"	S.Shürentsetseg	D.Otgonbayar	Yaarsangüi	5:17
7.	"Найзууд"	B.Lkhagvasüren	D.Otgonbayar	Naizuud	4:16
8.	"Амгалан оршиг"	Sh.Gürbazar	Kh.Mönkh-Yertünts	Amgalan orshig	4:44
9.	"Өнгө төгөлдөр"	P.Kherlen	D.Otgonbayar	Öngö tögöldör	3:20

Disc two
No.	Title	Lyrics	Music	Transliterated title	Length
1.	"Бүсгүйчүүд инээмсэглэ"	Kh.Tergel	D.Otgonbayar	Büsgüichüüd ineemsegle	4:08
2.	"Хатан эрдэнэ"	B.Batregzedmaa	D.Otgonbayar	Khatan erdene	5:10
3.	"Гэгээн гуниг"		S.Ishkhüü	Gegeen gunig	4:21
4.	"Чин зүрх"	O.Dashbalbar	D.Otgonbayar	Chin zürkh	3:54
5.	"Амин цэцэг"	Sh.Ur'khan	D.Otgonbayar	Amin tsetseg	5:19
6.	"Амар мэндийн дуу"	Dambyn Otgonbaatar, B.Gankhürel	D.Otgonbaatar	Amar mendiin duu	5:31
7.	"Амьдралын эхлэл"	T.Nansalmaa	S.Ononbat, D.Otgonbayar	Am'dralyn ekhlel	4:08
8.	"Бид чоно"	D.Tsoodol	Dambyn Ganbayar	Bid chono	4:38
9.	"Хатан эрдэнэ (instrumental)"		D.Otgonbayar	Khatan erdene (instrumental)	5:05
Total length:					83:48

=== 7,000,000,000 ===
7,000,000,000

Studio album by Hurd
- Released: 2021
- Studio: Hurd Studio
- Genres: Hard rock, Rock and roll
- Length: 43:52

7,000,000,000 or Doloon Terbum (Mongolian: Долоон тэрбум, "7 billion") is Hurd's ninth studio album, released in 2021.

The title song Doloon terbum features Uka.

Track listing

No.	Title	Lyrics	Music	Transliterated title	Length
1.	"Долоон тэрбум" (featuring Uka)	T.Nansalmaa	D.Otgonbayar	Doloon terbum	3:31
2.	"Багаа хуул"	Battsengel	D.Otgonbayar	Bagaa khuul	4:11
3.	"Гэгээн гоо"	B.Boldsaikhan	D.Otgonbayar	Gegeen goo	4:12
4.	"Хагархай хэнгэрэг"	B.Gankhürel	D.Mönkhbat	Khagarkhai khengereg	3:48
5.	"Орхиж чадахгүй"	Ü.Khürelbaatar	D.Otgonbaatar	Orkhij chadakhgui	4:18
6.	"Норсон зүрх"	B.Gankhürel	D.Otgonbayar	Norson zürkh	5:01
7.	"Хүнд суртал"		D.Ganbayar	Khünd surtal	4:00
8.	"Дэргэд минь байгаарай"	L.Erdenetsetseg	D.Otgonbaatar	Derged min' baigaarai	4:16
9.	"Хурд"	N.Dügeree	N.Naranbaatar	Khurd	5:52
10.	"Сайхан хайр"	B.Batnasan	S.Ishkhüü	Saikhan khair	4:45
Total length:					43:52

Additional personnel

- N.Naranbaatar - recording engineer
- G.Battüvshin - recording engineer
- Maxim Komov - mixing and mastering

== Compilation albums ==
=== The Best Collection III ===
The Best Collection III

Studio album by Hurd
- Released: 2001
- Recorded: 1993–1998, Chugu Studio, RITM Studio, Ulan Bator, Mongolia
- Length: 56:54

The Best Collection III is an album by Hurd, composed of various B-sides and previously unreleased songs.

Ekh oron features late B.Damchaa, a famous Mongolian actor. Khamag Mongol features pop singer Sarantuya and former Chingis Khaan singer D.Jargalsaikhan.

Ekh oron, Manlailan devegchiin duu and Bi Mongoltoigoo adilkhan were released as a single in 1999. Züüdend irsen eej was released in 1999 as a B-side to the Aavdaa bi khairtai/Bayangol düüregtee örgökh duu single, while Shine jil was released later in 2001 on Myangan Jild Gants.

Track listing

No.	Title	Lyrics	Music	Transliterated title	Length
1.	"Эх орон" (featuring B.Damchaa)	Kh.Chilaajav	D.Ganbayar, D.Otgonbayar	Ekh oron	5:04
2.	"Буцааж нэхэхгүй хайр"	Kh.Chilaajav	S.Ishkhüü	Butsaaj nekhekhgüi khair	5:13
3.	"Төөрөг"	B.Galsansükh	D.Otgonbayar	Töörög	5:32
4.	"Зүүдэнд ирсэн ээж"	Kh.Davaadash	S.Ishkhüü	Züüdend irsen eej	3:44
5.	"Манлайлан дэвэгчийн дуу"	D.Danzan	D.Otgonbayar	Manlailan devegchiin duu	5:34
6.	"Би Монголтойгоо адилхан"	Sh.Gürbazar	L.Balkhjav	Bi Mongoltoigoo adilkhan	5:56
7.	"Алтан нутаг"	D.Törbat	D.Otgonbayar	Altan nutag	4:18
8.	"Шинэ жил"	Kh.Chilaajav	D.Otgonbayar	Shine jil	4:09
9.	"Эцэг өвгөдийн нутаг"	Ubaa	G.Pürevdorj	Etseg övgödiin nutag	6:26
10.	"Би аавтай хүн"	Chinzorig	L.Balkhjav	Bi aavtai khün	5:44
11.	"Хамаг Монгол" (featuring Sarantuya and D.Jargalsaikhan)	Kh.Chilaajav	D.Otgonbayar	Khamag Mongol	5:14

== Live albums ==
=== Unplugged ===
Unplugged

Live album by Hurd
- Released: 1999
- Recorded: Top Ten nightclub, Ulan Bator, Mongolia, October 1998
- Genre: Heavy metal
- Length: 77:16

In the fall of 1998, Hurd played a series of sold-out acoustic concerts at a now-defunct Ulan Bator nightclub, Top Ten. One of these concerts was recorded and released as Unplugged. The album features 8 songs from The Best Collection II, 5 from The Best Collection I and 3 previously unreleased songs.

Chamaig zorino is the only Hurd song written by singer D.Tömörtsog. Eejdee örgökh duu is a well known Mongolian folk song.

Chamaig zorino and Nogoon shugüi were recorded in the studio a decade later for Khairyn Salkhi.

When the album was originally released, Chamaig zorino and Kharankhui were indexed as one track. When the album was reissued in the Black Box boxset in 2013, the two songs were separated.

Track listing

No.	Title	Lyrics	Music	Transliterated title	Length
1.	"Хар дарсан зүүд"	R.Mönkhsaikhan	D.Ganbayar	Khar darsan züüd	5:25
2.	"Чоно"	Kh.Lkhagvasuren	D.Ganbayar	Chono	4:08
3.	"Чимээгүй ирэх дурлал"	N.Khongor	D.Otgonbayar	Chimeegüi irekh durlal	6:22
4.	"Чамайг зорино" (previously unreleased) "Харанхуй"	D.Tömörtsog; D.Banzragch	D.Tömörtsog; D.Otgonbayar	Chamaig zorino Kharankhui	4:55; 4:01
5.	"Ногоон шугуй" (previously unreleased)			Nogoon shugui	3:37
6.	"Сайхан бүсгүй"	Kh.Davaadash	S.Ishkhüü, D.Otgonbayar	Saikhan büsgüi	4:45
7.	"Нулимсаа тэвчье"	S.Ishkhüü	D.Otgonbayar	Nulimsaa tevch'ye	5:14
8.	"Шөнө"	Sh.Mönkhbat	D.Ganbayar	Shönö	4:39
9.	"Алив бос"	R.Mönkhsaikhan	D.Ganbayar	Aliv bos	5:35
10.	"Ээждээ" (featuring S.Ishkhüü)	D.Boldbaatar	S.Ishkhüü, N.Naranbaatar	Eejdee	4:59
11.	"Ээждээ өргөх дуу" (previously unreleased)			Eejdee örgökh duu	4:06
12.	"Миний дайсан"	B.Luvsanjurmed	D.Otgonbayar	Minii daisan	4:06
13.	"Зураг шиг бүсгүй"	D.Amgalan, D.Otgonbaatar	S.Ishkhüü, D.Otgonbayar	Zurag shig büsgüi	5:16
14.	"Цэргийн бодол"	D.Ganbold	D.Ganbold	Tsergiin bodol	5:43
15.	"Миний Монгол"	B.Galsansükh	D.Ganbayar	Minii Mongol	4:25

Additional personnel

- S.Ishkhüü - vocals on Eejdee
- S.Nergüi - engineering
- Kh.Bayarbold - mixing

== Video albums ==
=== Talarkhalyn Kontsert ===
Talarkhalyn Kontsert Талархалын концерт

Video by Hurd
- Released: June 26, 2009
- Recorded: Sükhbaatar Square, Ulan Bator, Mongolia, July 11, 2005
- Genre: Heavy metal
- Length: 1:31:56

Talarkhalyn Kontsert or "The Gratitude Concert" was one of Hurd's biggest outdoor shows, which took place at the Sükhbaatar Square on Naadam day. It was a free concert celebrating the band's 10th anniversary, held before a crowd of 80,000 to 100,000 people, which is a record for Mongolia.

On June 26, 2009, the band released a DVD of this show and organized a release party at the Grand Khan pub in Ulan Bator.

Track listing

No.	Title	Transliterated title	Length
1.	"Эхлэл"	Ekhlel (intro)
2.	"Болтугай"	Boltugai
3.	"Монголд төрсөн юм"	Mongold törsön yum
4.	"Чамайг зорино"	Chamaig zorino
5.	"Очиж чадаагүй"	Ochij chadaagüi
6.	"Хүн"	Khün
7.	"13 ааш"	13 aash
8.	"Чимээгүй ирэх дурлал"	Chimeegüi irekh durlal
9.	"Хайрын сарнай"	Khairyn sarnai
10.	"Зураг шиг бүсгүй"	Zurag shig büsgüi
11.	"Нулимсаа тэвчье"	Nulimsaa tevch'ye
12.	"Чи минь байгаа болхоор"	Chi min' baigaa bolkhoor
13.	"Цэргийн бодол"	Tsergiin bodol
14.	"Хөгжмийн номер"	Khögjmiin nomer (instrumental)
15.	"Намайг тоогоогүй бүсгүйд баяр хүргэе"	Namaig toogoogüi büsgüid bayar khürgeye
16.	"Ээждээ"	Eejdee
17.	"Миний аав адуучин" (previously unreleased)	Minii aav aduuchin
18.	"Миний Монгол"	Minii Mongol
19.	"Эх орон"	Ekh oron

Additional personnel

- D.Ganbayar - percussion, drums
- Mönkh-Erdene - keyboard

=== Unplugged II ===
Unplugged II

Video by Hurd
- Released: June 26, 2009
- Recorded: Cultural Palace, Ulan Bator, Mongolia, December 2005
- Genre: Heavy metal
- Length: 1:44:55

In December 2005, Hurd played a second acoustic concert, dubbed Unplugged II, at The Cultural Palace of Ulan Bator. In 2009, a DVD with the video footage of that concert was released.

A previous lower quality version of this DVD was released in 2006 for promotional purposes only, but had a limited distribution.

In 2012, the audio from this concert was released on iTunes.

Track listing

No.	Title	Transliterated title	Length
1.	"Сэрүүн бухимдал"	Serüün bukhimdal
2.	"Бага нас"	Baga nas
3.	"Очиж чадаагүй"	Ochij chadaagüi
4.	"Бүүвэй аялна"	Büüvei ayalna
5.	"13 ааш"	13 aash
6.	"Үнэгүй юм"	Ünegüi yum
7.	"Жаргалтай нүдэнд нулимс зохихгүй"	Jargaltai nüdend nulims zokhikhgüi
8.	"Бүсгүй"	Büsgüi
9.	"Би Монголтойгоо адилхан / Би аавтай хүн"	Bi Mongoltoigoo adilkhan / Bi aavtai khün
10.	"Нулимс дуслахгүй хайр"	Nulims duslakhgüi khair
11.	"Болтугай"	Boltugai
12.	"Хүү нь гомдоогүй"	Khüü n' gomdoogüi
13.	"Аавдаа би хайртай"	Aavdaa bi khairtai
14.	"Чи минь байгаа болхоор"	Chi min' baigaa bolkhoor
15.	"Алсын хараатай амьдрал" (previously unreleased)	Alsyn kharaatai am'dral
16.	"Хайрын сарнай"	Khairyn sarnai
17.	"Намайг тоогоогүй бүсгүйд баяр хүргэе"	Namaig toogoogüi büsgüid bayar khürgeye
18.	"Шинэ жил"	Shine jil

Additional personnel

- D.Ganbayar - mandolin, melodica, percussion
- Amgalan - classical guitar
- Mönkh-Erdene - keyboard
- Buyan-Arvijikh, D.Navaantseren - accordion
- Nyamtuya, Saranchimeg, Odontsetseg - backing vocals
