= Weatherbird =

Cartoon bird character

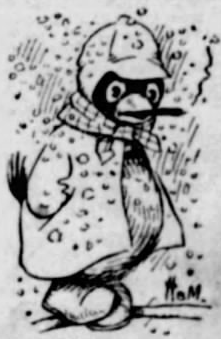
First Weatherbird appearance, February 11, 1901, drawn by Harry B. Martin

The Weatherbird is a cartoon character and a single-panel comic. It is printed on the front of the St. Louis Post-Dispatch and has been in the paper continuously since 1901, making it the longest-running American newspaper cartoon and a mascot of the newspaper.

== Cartoonists ==
The Weatherbird, in its long run, has been drawn by just six cartoonists (three of them, by coincidence, named Martin):

1. Harry B. Martin (1901 – 1903)
2. Oscar Chopin (1903 – 1910)
3. S. Carlisle Martin (1910 – 1932)
4. Amadee Wohlschlaeger (1932 – 1981)
5. Albert Schweitzer (1981 – 1986)
6. Dan Martin (1986 – present (as of 2021))

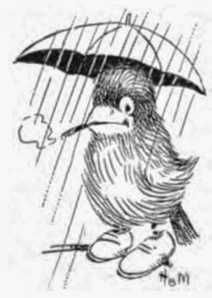
Another Harry Martin Weatherbird, showing the cigar associated with the character until the late 20th century

The character first appeared on February 11, 1901, Harry B. Martin originated the character, which was originally called "Dickey Bird" ('dicky-bird' is a generic slang term for any small bird). Martin had originally intended to rotate through just a few versions of the bird – one for rain, one for heat, etc. – but readers asked for a new drawing each day, which he then provided.

Martin later moved to New York where he drew the strips It Happened in Birdland (1907–1909) and Inbad the Tailor (1911–1912, for the New York American). Martin became a golf correspondent and an authority on golf (writing 15 books on the subject) and a founder of the American PGA.

Oscar Charles Chopin (1873 – 1932) inherited the Weatherbird from Martin, drawing it until 1910.

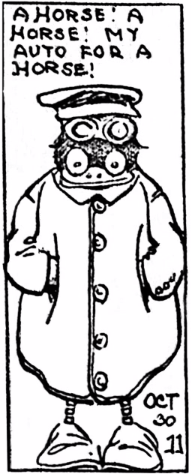
An S. Carlisle Martin Weatherbird

S. Carlisle Martin took over the Weatherbird in 1910. He started the tradition of making the Weatherbird comment on the news in addition to the weather, and started a pattern of six words or less for the bird's comments. He was assisted by Carlos Hurd, and drew the Weatherbird until his death in 1932.

In 1912, the Post-Dispatch began running a full-page, multiple-panel color strip on Sunday, titled "Jinx and the Weather Bird Family", and featuring the Weatherbird (called "George" in the strip), his wife, and their mischievous Katzenjammer Kids-like children in various putatively comical escapades. (Jinx was an imp who observed or initiated the hijinks; later the strip was later retitled to just "The Weather Bird Family".) Carlisle Martin drew the strip, but the scripts were by Jean Knott, who later drew and wrote strips in New York. The strip apparently did not last past 1912.

Amadee Wohlschlaeger had the longest tenure as Weatherbird artist: just short of fifty years. Wohlschlaeger was also the Post-Dispatch sports page cartoonist and drew for the Sporting News. Wohlschlaeger recalled that when barely out of his teens "I was doing sports art for the Post and when Carlisle died, I stayed up all night and drew 12 Weatherbirds so I could put them on the feature editor's desk the next morning. The feature editor grabbed me later in the day and said, 'You've got the job'". Wohlschlaeger retired in 1981 and lived until age 102, in 2014.

Dan Martin's Weatherbird (this one marking the 2004 death of Ronald Reagan). The Weatherbird has long since traded his wings and tail for hands. Martin's bird shows a bit of beak, though, in contrast to Amadee's entirely flat face.

In his nearly half-century-long tenure, Wohlschlaeger's Weatherbird commented on events such as D-Day, the assassination of John F. Kennedy, and the Apollo 11 Moon landing, but his favorite cartoon appeared on October 2, 1944: it showed the Weatherbird dressed in St. Louis Browns uniform and standing on his head, in honor of the Browns' first and only American League pennant.

Albert Schweitzer drew the first Weatherbirds to appear in color consistently. Schweitzer drew the Weatherbird with pink feathers, although he had appeared darkly shaded before. A long-time Post-Dispatch veteran, his retirement came just five years after he took over the strip.

Dan Martin took over the strip in 1986. He eliminated the Weatherbird's emblematic cigars and drew a bird with a bit more of a beak (previous cartoonists had atrophied the beak to the point of flatness). Martin wrote the book The Story of the First 100 Years of the St. Louis Post-Dispatch Weatherbird.

== Other manifestations ==
The Weatherbird inspired the name of John Hartford's "Weatherbird Reel".

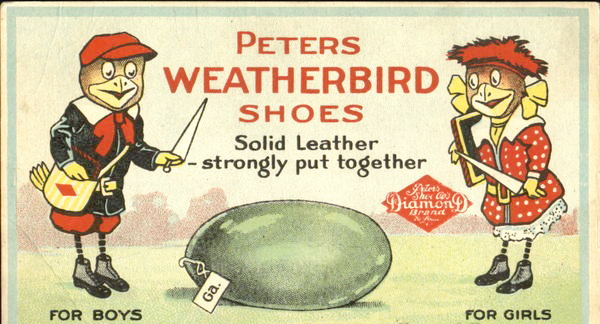

Weatherbird brand shoes for children, using pictures of the Weatherbird in advertising, were offered starting in 1901 by the St. Louis-based Peters Shoe Company, later part of International Shoe which continued to base the brand's image on the Weatherbird until 1932 (the brand itself continued at least through the 1950s).

Two of the original windows from the Peters Shoe Company factory, featuring pictures of the Weatherbird, adorn the Weatherbird Cafe in the St. Louis Post-Dispatch office.

A life-size Weatherbird costume is used by the Post-Dispatch for promotions such as meet-and-greets at local bars.
