= Los Angeles Examiner =

Newspaper in California, US (1903–1962)

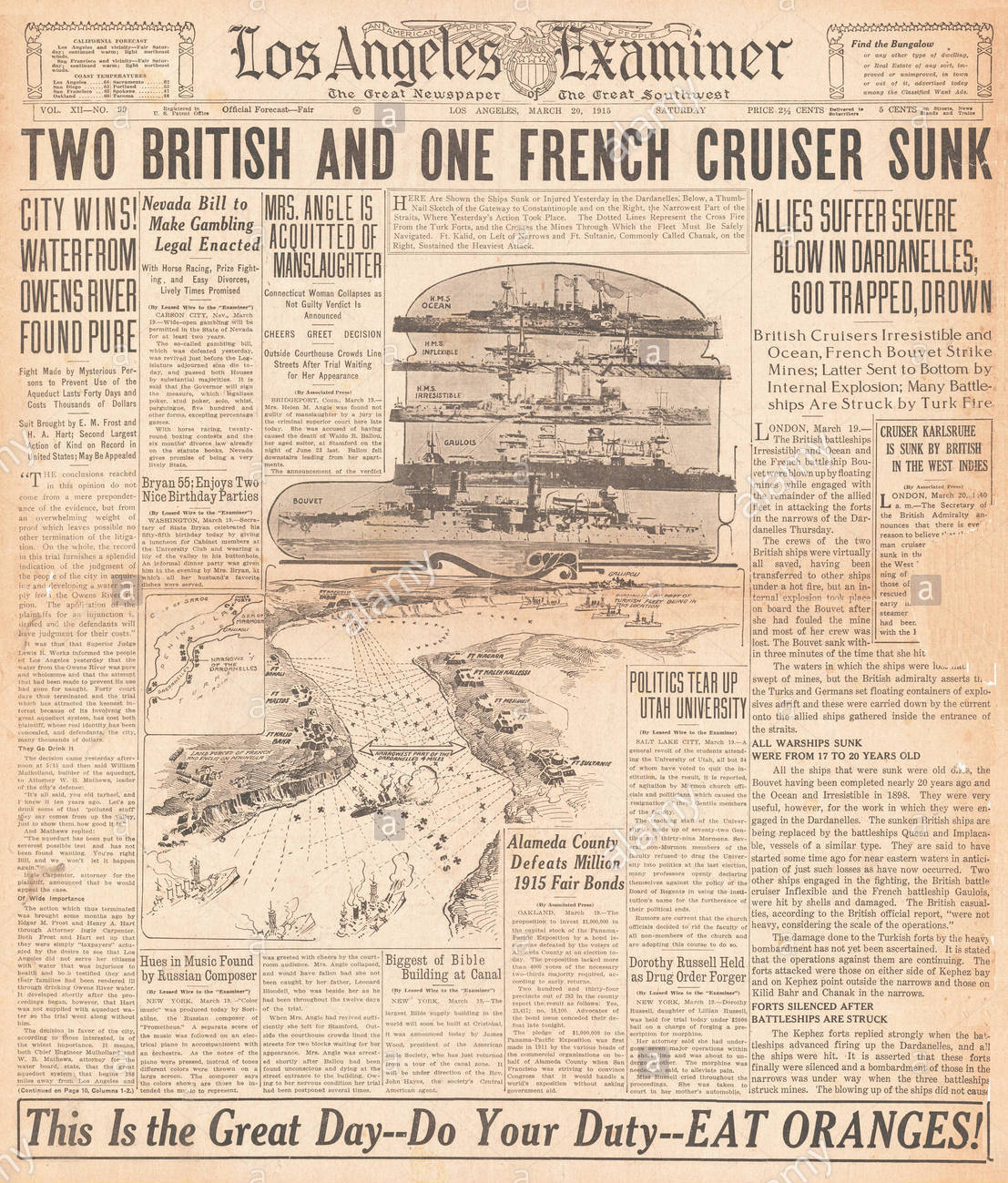
- Cover of Los Angeles Examiner on March 20, 1915
- Type: Morning daily newspaper
- Format: Print
- Founder: William Randolph Hearst
- Founded: December 13, 1903; Merged into Los Angeles Herald-Express in 1962 and continued as Los Angeles Herald Examiner until November 2, 1989
- Language: English

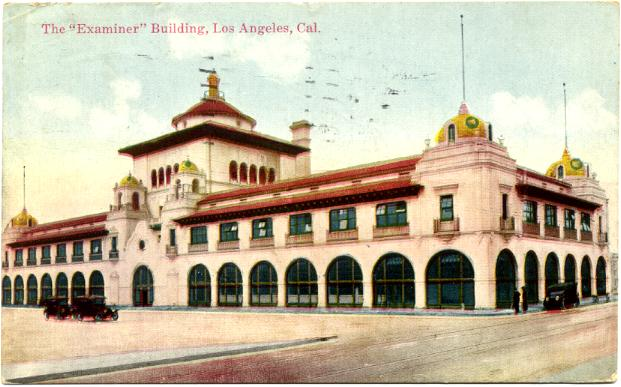
The Los Angeles Examiner building in the 1920s

The Los Angeles Examiner was a newspaper founded in 1903 by William Randolph Hearst in Los Angeles. The afternoon Los Angeles Herald-Express and the morning Los Angeles Examiner, both of which had been publishing in the city since the turn of the 20th century, merged in 1962. For a few years after this merger, the Los Angeles Herald Examiner claimed the largest afternoon-newspaper circulation in the country, publishing its last edition on November 2, 1989.

== Founding ==
The first edition was issued on Sunday, December 13, 1903, under the management of L. C. Strauss, who had managed the New York City office of the San Francisco Examiner, the first Hearst-owned newspaper. It was predicted to be Democratic in politics and to compete with the Republican-supporting Los Angeles Times, another morning newspaper.

The Examiner published a preview edition on Friday, December 11, to announce its platform, but its first regular "mammoth Sunday issue" (84 pages, "profusely illustrated") was dated December 13. "Fireworks, the booming of cannon and shouts of the populace greeted the appearance of the paper."

The Weekly Journal-Miner of Prescott, Arizona, wrote on December 16, 1903, of the Examiner:

The paper is a typical Hearst publication, a style of journalism which is original with Mr. Hearst and the only one of its kind in the United States and for that matter the world, except for the Phenix Enterprise (Phoenix Enterprise), which affects the Hearst style.

The Journal-Miner predicted the Examiner would be a pro-labor newspaper as opposed to the rival open-shop The Los Angeles Times.

== Building ==
The five-story Los Angeles Examiner Building on South Broadway at 11th Street was designed in a mix of Mission Revival and Spanish Colonial Revival styles by architect Julia Morgan. The 7,800-square-foot building was the largest structure in the United States devoted solely to the publication of a newspaper.

A train of nine freight cars arrived in Los Angeles on November 19, 1903, loaded with the machinery to print the paper. Five of the cars carried a mammoth Hoe printing press.

In 1918, a set for the motion picture The Empty Cab was a replica of the editorial rooms of the Examiner.

The Sunday Examiner building was displayed prominently in Laurel and Hardy's skyscraper, girder-walking sequence that was part of the silent Hal Roach comedy "Liberty" (1929).

== Patriotism controversy ==
In common with the other Hearst newspapers, the Examiner was opposed to American involvement in World War One and in 1918 attracted opposition and boycotts.

A "large number of editorials attacking the government's war policies," clipped from the Examiner, were seized in a raid by federal agents in a raid on a Santa Barbara school for boys called "Boyland." Five people were arrested and charged with espionage.

An organization called the California Loyal League claimed that the Examiner was "disloyal and a dangerous influence in this city." It included both the French and the British consuls in Los Angeles.

The University Club of Los Angeles and the Sierra Madre Club both banned the Examiner from its reading rooms. Examiner staffers were barred from taking photographs at a French national day celebration at the Shrine Auditorium. They were jeered on their way out of the building.

== Staffers manhandled and kidnapped ==
In 1934, automobile-race driver Al Reinke and driver Babe Stapp were indicted on charges of manhandling and then kidnapping reporter James Lee who went with photographer John Bennus to the funeral of Ernie Triplett, who had been killed in a racing accident in Imperial, California. Lee said five men threatened violence against the newspaper's workers if news photos were taken at the funerals of any race drivers. The newspaper had been campaigning against automobile-racing fatalities.

Reinke was killed in a racing accident before he could be tried.

== Merger ==
In 1962, the morning Examiner merged with the Los Angeles Herald-Express, an afternoon newspaper also owned by the Hearst organization. The Examiner published its last edition on Sunday, January 7. The succeeding newspaper was known as the Los Angeles Herald Examiner.

A Los Angeles historian wrote in 2010, “A 1962 merger [of the Examiner] with the Los Angeles Herald-Express, Hearst's afternoon paper, was merely a formality, as the two papers had shared workspace for decades.”

== Notable people ==
- Oscar Chopin, cartoonist
- Elliott Roosevelt, aviation editor
