= Herding Cats =

Herding cats is an English idiom that refers to attempting to control something that is hard to control. As a name, it may refer to:

- Herding Cats: A Life in Politics, a 2005 book by Trent Lott
- Herding Cats (album), by Gaelic Storm, 1999
- Herding Cats, a 2010 play by Lucinda Coxon
- Herding Cats, a 2010 book by Graeme Davies
- Herding Cats: Multiparty Mediation in a Complex World, a 1999 book by Chester Crocker and others
- Herding Cats, a 2018 Sarah's Scribbles collection of comics by Sarah Andersen
- Managing people is like Herding Cats: Warren Bennis on leadership, a 1997 book by Warren Bennis

== See also ==
- Cat Herders, a 2000 commercial for Electronic Data Systems (EDS)
- Herd (disambiguation)
