= Hurd (surname) =

Hurd is a surname. Notable people with the surname include:

- Andrew Hurd (born 1982), Canadian Olympic swimmer
- Anthony Hurd, Baron Hurd (1901–1966), former British politician in the Conservative Party
- Carlos Hurd (1876–1950), American journalist
- Clement Hurd (1908–1988), American illustrator of children's books
- David Hurd (born 1950), American composer, concert organist
- Douglas Hurd (born 1930), British politician in the Conservative Party
- Elizabeth Shakman Hurd, American academic
- Ethel Edgerton Hurd (1845–1929), American physician, suffragist, and social reformer
- Gale Anne Hurd (born 1955), American film producer
- Harvey B. Hurd (1808-1906), Chicago lawyer, abolitionist, and social reformer
- Helen Marr Hurd (1839–1909), American educator, poet
- Hugh Lincoln Hurd (1925–1995), an American actor and civil rights activist, and Michelle Hurd's father
- Jalen Hurd (born 1996), American football player
- Jud Hurd (1913–2005), American cartoonist
- Karen Hurd (born 1958), Wisconsin politician
- Mark Hurd (1957–2019), American CEO of Oracle Corp.
- Melody Hurd (born 2011), American actress, dancer and model
- Michael Hurd (1928–2006), composer, teacher and author
- Michelle Hurd (born 1966), American stage, film, and television actress, and Hugh Hurd's daughter
- Morgan Hurd (born 2001), American artistic gymnast
- Nick Hurd (born 1962), British politician in the Conservative Party
- Paige Hurd (born 1992), American actress
- Percy Hurd (1864–1950), former British politician in the Conservative Party
- Peter Hurd (1904–1984), American artist
- Rachel Hurd-Wood (born 1990), British actress
- Richard Hurd (bishop) (1720–1808), English clergyman and writer
- Richard Hurd (educator), American labor scholar
- Richard Melancthon Hurd (1865–1941), American real estate banker and political activist
- Robert Hurd (1905–1963), British architect
- Ryan Hurd (born 1986), American country singer
- Thacher Hurd (born 1949), American artist and author of children's picture books
- Thaddeus B. Hurd (1903–1989), American architect and amateur historian known for his research on Clyde, Ohio
- Theodore A. Hurd (1819–1899), Justice of the Kansas Supreme Court
- Thomas Hurd (1747–1823), British naval officer and hydrographer
- Steve Hurd (born 1956) visual artist, paintings and site-specific works
- Will Hurd (born 1977), American politician and member of the U.S. House of Representatives from Texas
- Will Hurd (rugby union) (born 1999), Scottish international rugby union player
- Annie May Hurd Karrer (1893–1984), American plant physiologist

== See also ==
- Herd (surname)
