= Harry B. Martin =

American cartoonist

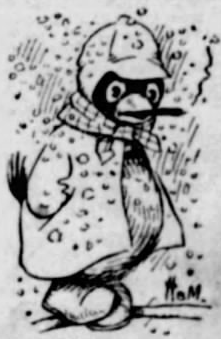
Martin's first Weatherbird, February 11, 1901

Harry B. "Dickie" Martin (26 May 1873– 15 April 1959) was an American cartoonist and golf writer, one of the founding members of the Professional Golfers' Association of America (PGA).

== Early life and cartooning ==
Martin was born on May 26, 1873, in Salem, Illinois. His given name was Horace. He was the third of four children of Thompson and Jennie Martin; Thompson Martin was a laborer. Martin studied at Vincennes University and began working in newspapers in Vincennes, Indiana in 1893.

In 1894, Martin was living in St. Louis and working as a cartoonist, and was hired by Chris von der Ahe as the secretary and official scorer for the St. Louis Browns.

Martin originated the Weatherbird character and single-panel comic strip for the St. Louis Post-Dispatch on February 11, 1901. Martin handed the strip off to Oscar Chopin in 1903. The Weatherbird continues in use to this day and is the oldest continuously-published strip. The bird was first named "Dickie Bird" ("dicky-bird" is a generic slang term for any small bird) and it is from this that Martin got his nickname.

Martin moved to New York City in 1904 and worked for the New York World, New York American, and New York Globe. He drew the strips It Happened In Birdland (April 12, 1907 – January 6, 1908 and February 26, 1909 – September 7, 1909 for the New York Evening Journal) and Inbad The Tailor (April 27, 1911 – June 18, 1912, for the New York American). He also drew sports cartoons.

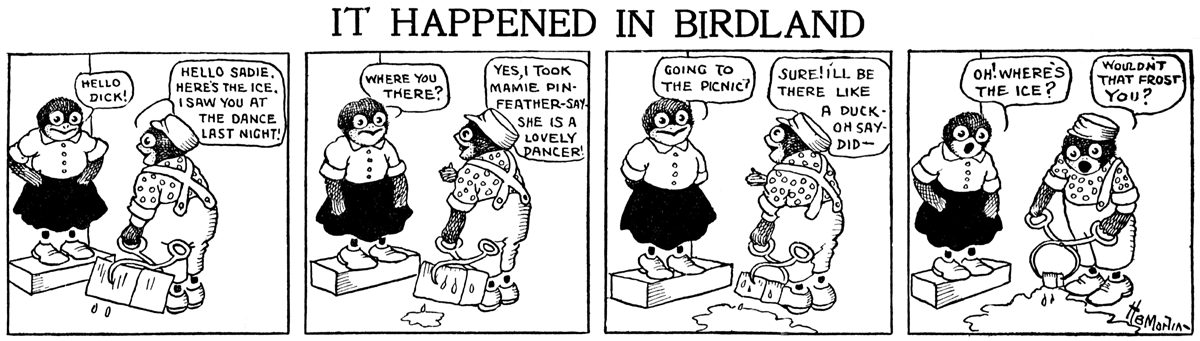
It Happened In Birdland

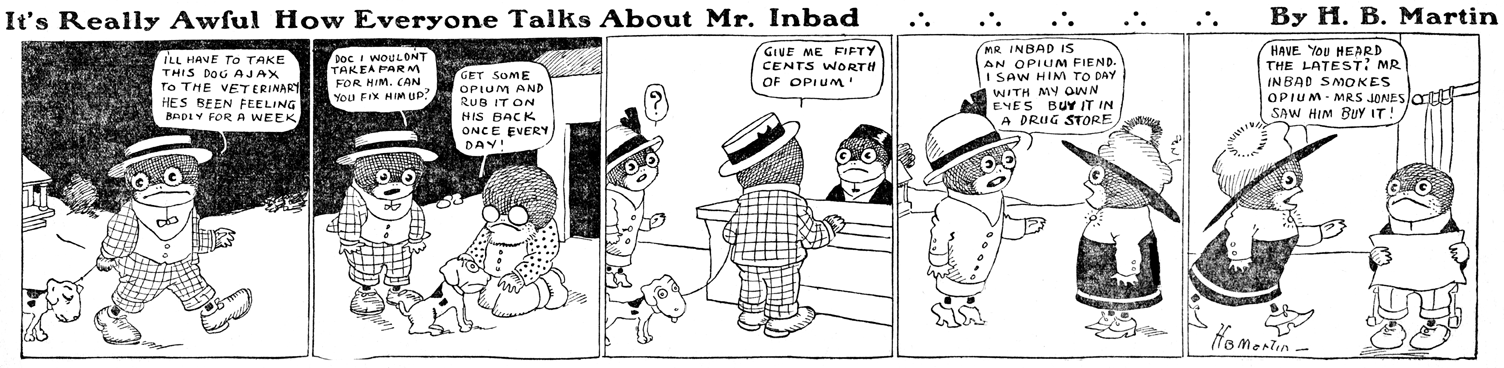
Inbad The Tailor

== Golf writer ==
Martin worked as a golf journalist (including covering matches overseas) and was an expert on golf. He wrote fifteen golf books and at one time was the editor of four golf magazines. He organized a number of exhibition golf matches and was a founder of the American PGA.

== Personal life and death ==
Martin married Susan Flanders on December 3, 1900, in St. Louis. They had two children. He died on April 15, 1959, in New York City.

== Publications ==
- Martin, Harry B. (1966) [1936]. 50 Years of American Golf. Foreword by Grantland Rice (Reprint ed.). Argosy Antiquarian Ltd 1966 (Dodd, Mead 1936). ISBN 978-0872660205.
- Martin, Harry B. Golf for Beginners
- Martin, Harry B. Golf Made Easy
- Martin, Harry B. What’s Wrong With Your Game?
- Martin, Harry B. Pictorial Golf
- Martin, Harry B. Graphic Golf
- Martin, Harry B. Great Golfers in the Making
