= The Herd =

The Herd may refer to:

== Film, television, and radio ==
- The Herd (1978 film), a Turkish drama
- The Herd (1998 film), a Canadian documentary
- The Herd (2025 film), a Nigerian crime thriller
- The Herd with Colin Cowherd, an FS1 and Fox Sports Radio program

== Music ==
- The Herd (Australian band), a hip-hop group from Sydney, Australia
  - The Herd (The Herd album), 2001
- The Herd (British band), the 1960s UK band that launched Peter Frampton's career
- The Herd (Wipers album), 1996

== Sports ==
- Marshall Thundering Herd, sports teams representing Marshall University
- Wisconsin Herd, an American basketball team
- Buffalo Bisons, an American baseball team, nicknamed "The Herd"
- The Herd (hooligan firm), a group of English football hooligans associated with Arsenal F.C.

== Other ==
- "The Herd", a Vietnam War-era nickname of United States Army 173rd Airborne Brigade Combat Team
- "the herd", a commonly used phrase in the book The Philosophy of Friedrich Nietzsche (1907) by H. L. Mencken
- Herd of Sheffield, a public art trail in Sheffield, UK

== See also ==
- Herd (disambiguation)
- Herding
