= Hirdman (surname) =

Hirdman is a Scandinavian surname. Notable people with the surname include:

- Sven Hirdman (born 1939), Swedish diplomat and ambassador
- Yvonne Hirdman (born 1943), Swedish historian and gender researcher
