= Sarantuya =

Mongolian singer

Sarantuya Сарантуяа
- Born: Batmönkhiin Sarantuyaa; 20 April 1970 (age 56); Ulaanbaatar, Mongolia
- Genre: Pop
- Occupation: Singer
- Instrument: Vocals
- Years active: 1986–present
- Labels: Hi-Fi Media group; Saraa's Music Production
- Children: 3

Batmönkhiin Sarantuyaa (Mongolian: Батмөнхийн Сарантуяа; born 20 April 1970), known mononymously as Sarantuya or simply Saraa, is a Mongolian mezzo-soprano singer who has been a major figure in the pop music scene of the Mongol people since the late 1980s. She is still very popular among the Mongolian population, and is recognized as the queen of Mongolian pop music. She uses a falsetto technique when singing.

Saraa is the highest-selling Mongolian artist of all time, with hits like "Torson Odriin Bayar", "Bi Jargaltai", "Argagui Amrag", and others.

Saraa was born in Ulaanbaatar, and started off singing in a small band called "Mungun Harandaa" (translated as "Silver Pencil"). Her first solo live-concert, named "Setgeliin Khug", was in 1994 with 2325 fans in attendance. Throughout her career, she has released total of 23 studio albums. Her 40th Anniversary concert named “Khairiin burkhan” was one of the hugest events of Mongolian pop industry.

== Awards ==
Known as the "Pop Diva", Saraa was named "Singer of the Century" - an unprecedented honor for a Mongolian. She has also received numerous other awards, one of which is "Best Artist" from Pentatonic, a mainstream music festival held annually.

== Personal life ==
Saraa's mother is of Yakut descent. Saraa is divorced and has two children, a son and daughter. She was once married to Boldkhuyag, a Golomt Bank executive.

== Discography ==
Title	Year
Зүүдний говь	1993
Инээмтгий хүн	1994
Аргагүй амраг	1996
Миний дуу (cassette)	1997
Эгэл сэтгэл	1998
Хайрын зөрлөг	2000
Тэгвэл хоёулаа (children's songs)	2001
Saraa De Mооn	2002
Би жаргалтай — 2 CD	2003
Шинэ жилийн аялгуу	2004
Өнөөдөр ирсэн дурлал	2007
Төрсөн өдрийн аялгуу	2009
Аргагүй Монгол аялгуу	2011
