= Albert Schweitzer (train) =

German express train (1980–1983)

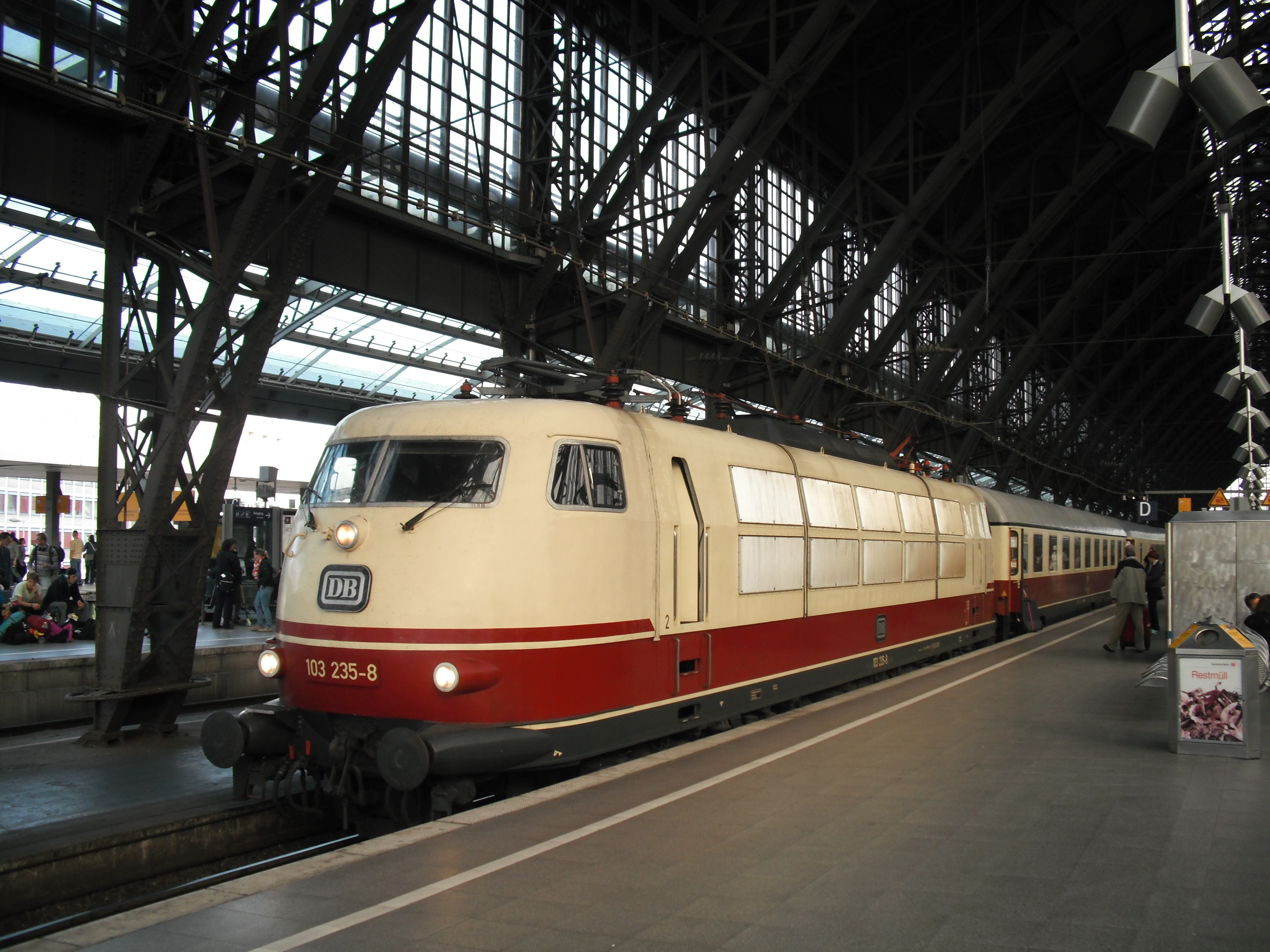

Overview
- Service type: Trans Europ Express (TEE)
- Status: Discontinued
- Locale: Germany; France
- First service: 2 June 1980
- Last service: 27 May 1983
- Former operator(s): Deutsche Bundesbahn (DB); SNCF

Route
- Termini: Dortmund Hbf; Strasbourg-Ville
- Stops: 12
- Service frequency: Daily, Monday to Friday
- Train number(s): TEE 8, 9

On-board services
- Class(es): First class only
- Catering facilities: Restaurant car

Technical
- Track gauge: 1,435 mm (4 ft 8 1/2 in)
- Electrification: 15 kV AC, 16.7 Hz (Germany)
Route placard (1983)
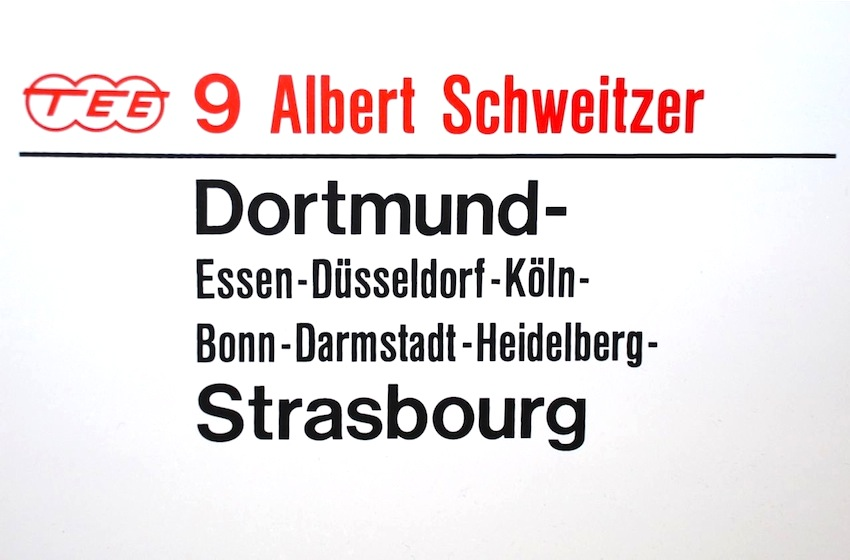
- Route placard from the TEE Albert Schweitzer

The Albert Schweitzer was a short-lived express train that linked Dortmund Hbf in Dortmund, Germany, with Strasbourg-Ville in Strasbourg, France. Introduced in 1980, it was operated by the Deutsche Bundesbahn (DB) and the SNCF.

The train was named after Albert Schweitzer (1875–1965), a German and then French theologian, organist, philosopher, physician, and medical missionary, who was born in the province of Alsace-Lorraine and educated partly in Strasbourg.

The Albert Schweitzer was a first-class-only Trans Europ Express (TEE) and operated on Mondays to Fridays only. It was intended mainly to provide transport between Bonn, then the capital of West Germany, and the European Parliament in Strasbourg. It was discontinued in 1983.

== Route and timetable ==
- Dortmund Hbf – Essen – Düsseldorf – Cologne (Köln) – Bonn – Darmstadt – Heidelberg – Karlsruhe – Strasbourg-Ville

The southbound train (TEE 9) was scheduled to depart from Dortmund at 6:35 and arrive in Strasbourg at 11:48. The northbound train (TEE 8) was scheduled to leave Strasbourg at 16:43 and reach Dortmund at 21:52.

== Formation (consist) ==
The train's coaches were all from German Federal Railways (DB) and included a separate restaurant car, operated by the German Sleeper and Dining Car Company (in German: Deutsche Schlafwagen- und Speisewagen-Gesellschaft, or DSG). Throughout its route, the train was hauled by electric locomotives, from DB within Germany and from SNCF within France.

== EC Albert Schweitzer ==
In June 2001, a EuroCity service was introduced with the name Albert Schweitzer, linking Frankfurt with Lyon via Strasbourg. In late 2002, the route was altered at its east end to originate and terminate in Stuttgart instead of Frankfurt. The EC Albert Schweitzer was still serving this route, Stuttgart – Strasbourg – Lyon (and vice versa), in summer 2003, but in September 2003 SNCF discontinued use of train names generally, and this EC service became unnamed.

== See also ==
- History of rail transport in France
- History of rail transport in Germany
- List of named passenger trains of Europe
