= List of Hurd band members =

This article discusses the members of the Mongolian heavy metal band Hurd. Five of the band's current members are brothers: Ganbayar, Tömörtsog, Otgonbayar, Otgonbaatar and Münkhbat are sons of Damba (see Mongolian name). All the members were born and raised in the railway district in Ulan Bator.

== Dambyn Ganbayar ==
Dambyn Ganbayar Дамбын Ганбаяр
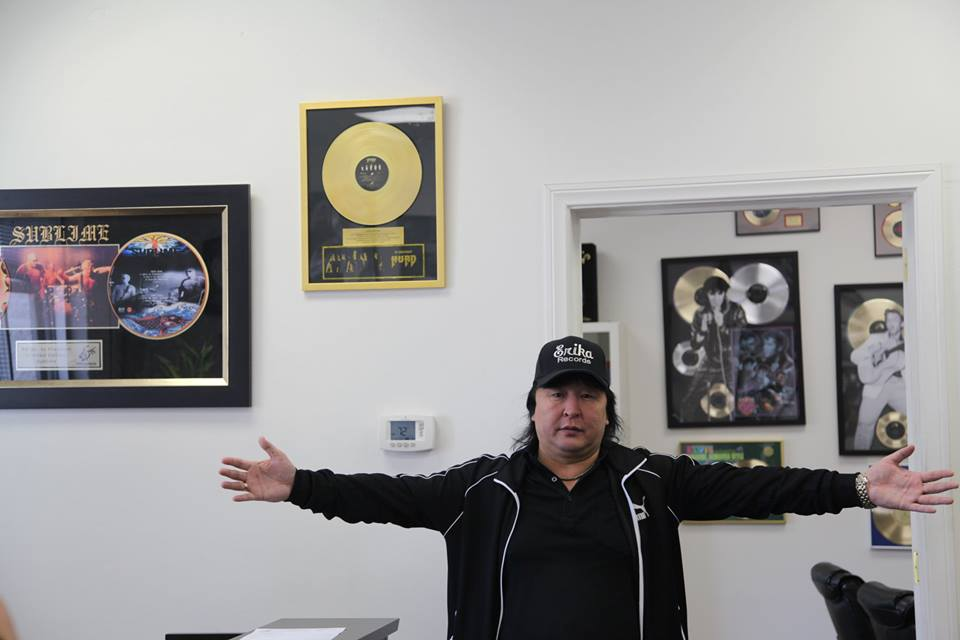

Background information
- Born: 6 June 1963 (age 62)
- Occupations: Multi-instrumentalist, songwriter, producer
- Instruments: Guitar, drums, piano
- Years active: 1975–present

Dambyn Ganbayar or Дамбын Ганбаяр (born 6 June 1963) is Hurd's founding member, manager and instrumentalist.

Ganbayar is the oldest member in the band and he has re-formed the second line-up of Hurd with lead guitarist D.Otgonbayar and bassist N.Naranbaatar starting from 1991. Although not officially carrying the title, he fulfills the managers and producers duties.

Ganbayar's interest in foreign heavy metal music dates back to 1975. Among his favourite bands are Metallica, Iron Maiden, Judas Priest, WASP. As a child, Ganbayar has played guitar, then drums in Gan Zam (Mongolian: Ган зам, "railway"), and later drums in Enkhiin tug (Mongolian: Энхийн туг, "flag of peace"). He continued playing in bands during his student years in Donetsk, Ukraine.

Ganbayar is a complete musician, capable of playing a wide variety of instruments. Originally he was Hurd's drummer, until the arrival of his younger brother Otgonbaatar in 1997. He often accompanies Hurd on a Korg Triton music workstation or percussion instruments. In Unplugged II, he is seen playing mandolin, melodica or harmonica. Since the departure of T.Naranbaatar in late 2008, Ganbayar has also been playing rhythm guitar, most of the time an Ovation Balladeer 6751 twelve-string acoustic.

Ganbayar has composed at least 10 songs for Hurd, most famous ones being Chono, Ekh oron, Minii Mongol or Ochij chadaagui. In 1999, Ganbayar won the "Best Musician" award at the Pentatonic Awards.

== Dambyn Tömörtsog ==
Dambyn Tömörtsog Дамбын Төмөрцог
- Also known as: Tsogoo / Цогоо
- Born: 18 June 1969 (age 56)
- Occupation: Singer
- Years active: 1993–present

Dambyn Tömörtsog or Дамбын Төмөрцог (born 18 June 1969) is Hurd's lead vocalist since 1993.

Tömörtsog loved music since he was little. He was nine years old when he began playing guitar, and today he is also capable of playing piano and drums. According to Tömörtsog, when in school, he was a "real trouble maker" and regularly got detention. Before joining Hurd, he was a herder, finished his military service and sold milk in Ulan Bator.

Tömörtsog is known for his powerful voice, capable of reaching very high notes. In his student years, he used to sing during the school-organized events. Today, he makes regular vocal exercises on a piano to keep his voice in good shape. More intensive rehearsals start about a month before a show takes place.

Tömörtsog has won the Merited Artist of Mongolia award in 2009 and a number of Pentatonic awards. Tömörtsog has one song to his credit, having written the music and the lyrics of the power ballad Chamaig zorino. Although the song was written very early on, it wasn't released on any of Hurd's studio albums before Khairyn Salkhi. Live versions are available on Unplugged and Talarkhalyn Kontsert.

Tömörtsog uses Shure wireless microphones for his on stage performances.

== Dambyn Otgonbayar ==
Dambyn Otgonbayar Дамбын Отгонбаяр
- Born: 28 December 1973 (age 52)
- Occupations: Musician, songwriter, singer
- Instruments: Guitar, piano
- Years active: 1991–present

Dambyn Otgonbayar or Дамбын Отгонбаяр (born 28 December 1973) is Hurd's lead guitarist since 1991.

Otgonbayar joined Hurd right after finishing secondary school in 1991. Otgonbayar is a Metallica fan and his musical style is much influenced by their music. Slash, Joe Satriani, Steve Vai and Ts.Enkhmanlai from Haranga are among his favorite guitarists.

Otgonbayar composed his first song for Hurd in 1993, a power ballad named Chimeegüi irekh durlal, later released on The Best Collection I. Being one of the most famous of Hurd's songs, it is played live at virtually every Hurd concert. To this day, Otgonbayar has written more than half of Hurd's music, with over 50 songs to his credit.

Otgonbayar uses mainly a Fender Stratocaster or an ESP EXP for recording sessions, as well as live performances. He is also known to possess a Gibson EDS-1275 double neck guitar. His acoustic guitars are of Taylor brand. Other equipment includes:

- Marshall amplifiers
- Korg ToneWorks AX3000G modeling signal processor
- Line 6 POD amp modeler
- Shure wireless receiver
- D'Addario strings
- Dunlop picks

Otgonbayar was a coach on The Voice of Mongolia.

=== Bi Bol ===
Bi Bol Би бол

Studio album by Dambyn Otgonbayar
- Released: 2003
- Recorded: 1995–2003
- Studio: Sonor and RITM Studios, Ulan Bator, Mongolia
- Genre: Heavy metal, Nu metal
- Length: 42:51

Dambyn Otgonbayar chronology
''Bi Bol; Би бол'' (2003)	Bi Yavsaar; Би явсаар (2012)

In 2003, Otgonbayar released a solo album titled Bi Bol (Mongolian: Би бол, "I am"), containing mainly instrumental songs written between 1995 and 2003. Some of them are instrumental reprises of Hurd songs, while others are previously unreleased recordings. A notable exception is Ödör shönö, which is just a remastered version of the same track from the 1999 album of the same name, with Dambyn Tömörtsog's original vocals.

Track listing

No.	Title	Lyrics	Music	Transliterated title	Length
1.	"Эрч хүч"		D.Otgonbayar	Erch khüch	5:32
2.	"Цэргийн бодол"		D.Otgonbayar, S.Ononbat	Tsergiin bodol	3:50
3.	"Өөрийгөө би"	L.Enkh-Amgalan	T.Naranbaatar	Ööriigöö bi	3:56
4.	"Янжмаа (охин)"		D.Otgonbayar	Yanjmaa (okhin)	2:58
5.	"Даяарчлал"		D.Otgonbayar	Dayaarchlal	3:09
6.	"Хилчний уянга"	J.Shagdar	Yu.Khönkhör	Khilchnii uyanga	3:13
7.	"Би бол"		D.Otgonbayar	Bi bol	2:07
8.	"Хүүхдүүд"		D.Otgonbayar	Khüükhdüüd	2:13
9.	"Ноён нуруу"	Ch.Boldbaatar	D.Otgonbayar	Noyon nuruu	5:06
10.	"Ээж хайрхан"		D.Otgonbayar	Eej khairkhan	5:06
11.	"Өдөр шөнө"	D.Otgonbaatar	D.Otgonbaatar	Ödör shönö	4:06
12.	"Хурд"		D.Otgonbayar	Khurd	2:43
Total length:					42:51

=== Bi Yavsaar... ===
Bi Yavsaar... Би явсаар...

Studio album by Dambyn Otgonbayar
- Released: 2012
- Genre: Heavy metal, Hard rock, Folk metal, Alternative rock

Dambyn Otgonbayar chronology
Bi Bol (2003)	''Bi Yavsaar... Би явсаар...'' (2012)

Released in 2012, Bi Yavsaar... (Mongolian: Би явсаар, "I am still going") is Otgonbayar's second instrumental album.

Track listing

No.	Title	Music	Transliterated title	Length
1.	"Эхэлье"	D.Otgonbayar	Ehel'ye	2:22
2.	"Салхи чи"	D.Otgonbayar	Salkhi chi	3:49
3.	"Чамайг санана"	D.Otgonbayar	Chamaig sanana	4:09
4.	"Аз жаргал"	D.Otgonbayar	Az jargal	3:50
5.	"Би явсаар л"	D.Otgonbayar	Bi yavsaar l	4:09
6.	"Ариусал"	D.Otgonbayar	Ariusal	4:55
7.	"Бид хоёр"	D.Otgonbayar	Bid khoyor	4:25
8.	"Бүр дээшээ"	D.Otgonbayar	Bür deeshee	3:55
9.	"Гараа өгөөч"	D.Otgonbayar	Garaa ögööch	3:52
10.	"Олон жил"	D.Otgonbayar	Olon jil	5:16
11.	"Миний гудамж"	D.Otgonbayar	Minii gudamj	3:23
12.	"Сонсоцгоо"	D.Otgonbayar	Sonsotsgoo	4:09
13.	"Ингэж тоглоё"	D.Otgonbayar	Ingej togloyo	2:04
14.	"Цахилгаан"	D.Otgonbayar	Tsakhilgaan	3:34
Total length:				53:52

== Namsraijavyn Naranbaatar ==
Namsraijavyn Naranbaatar Намсрайжавын Наранбаатар
- Also known as: Naaya / Нааяа
- Born: 24 July 1974 (age 51)
- Occupations: Musician, singer
- Instrument: Bass guitar
- Years active: 1992–present

Namsraijavyn Naranbaatar or Намсрайжавын Наранбаатар (born 24 July 1974) is one of Hurd's founding members and has been their bassist since 1992.

Naranbaatar grew up listening to speed metal bands of the 80's. He is primarily a fingerstyle player, but has been known to play with a pick sometimes.

is also the band's backing vocalist and studio engineer. He co-wrote with S.Ishkhüü the music to one of Hurd's most famous songs, Eejdee. In November 2009, Naranbaatar was awarded the Polar Star award for outstanding achievement.

Naranbaatar's main instrument is a Music Man StingRay. For acoustic sets, he uses a Taylor AB1 acoustic bass. Other equipment used by Naranbaatar includes:

- Trace Elliot amplifiers
- Dunlop wah-wah pedal
- Shure wireless receiver
- D'Addario strings
- Dunlop picks

== Dambyn Otgonbaatar ==
Dambyn Otgonbaatar Дамбын Отгонбаатар
- Born: 30 November 1974 (age 51)
- Occupations: Musician, songwriter
- Instruments: Drums, percussions
- Years active: 1997–present

Dambyn Otgonbaatar or Дамбын Отгонбаатар (born 30 November 1974) is Hurd's drummer since 1997.

Otgonbaatar grew up listening to heavy metal music of the 80's and began playing guitar at the age of ten. He then started learning drums at the age of fourteen, spending 8 hours a day practicing.

The first song Otgonbaatar ever wrote is Boltugai from The Best Collection II. He has composed the music of at least 12 songs in Hurd's catalog, which makes of him the second contributor behind Otgonbayar. His biggest songwriting contribution was for Züirlekh Argagüi, for which he wrote 6 songs.

Equipment

- Tama drums
  - 10"x10" tom
  - 12"x12" tom
  - 18"x00" floor tom
  - 16"x00" floor tom
  - 24"x00" bass drums
- Yamaha drums
  - 10"x10" tom
  - 12"x12" tom
  - 18"x18" floor tom
  - 16"x16" floor tom
  - 24" bass drums
- Zildjian cymbals
  - 16", 17", 18", 19" medium cymbals
  - 20" china trash
  - 13", 14" hi-hats
  - 20" custom china
- Paiste cymbals
  - 16", 17", 18", 19" medium cymbals
- Remo drum heads
- Tama Iron Cobra pedals
- Easton Ahead 5A drum sticks
- Vic Firth 5A drum sticks

=== Green Mask ===
In June 2007, Otgonbaatar has founded a percussion trio called Green Mask (Mongolian: Грийн Маск). The three members of Green Mask were chosen from Otgonbaatar's drum classes. While performing, they wear green masks, and they have chosen to avoid publicity and remain anonymous.
