= Albert Schweitzer (artist) =

American artist (1921–2023)

- Born: Albert L. Schweitzer; November 28, 1921
- Died: January 30, 2023 (aged 101)
- Occupation: Artist

Albert L. Schweitzer (November 28, 1921 – January 30, 2023) was an American artist. He was known for his work as a newspaper cartoonist for St. Louis Post-Dispatch. He illustrated its Weatherbird cartoon from 1981 to 1986.

== Biography ==
=== Early life and education ===
Schweitzer grew up in the Compton Heights neighborhood in St. Louis, Missouri. He was named after his father, a former prosecuting attorney and eventual president of the St. Louis Board of Aldermen.

Schweitzer attended Chaminade High School, St. Louis University, and the University of Missouri.

Schweitzer was in the United States Marine Corps in the 1940s. He served as a gunner on the South Dakota.

=== Career ===
After World War II, he worked for the St. Louis Star-Times and then the Post-Dispatch from 1950 to 1986, when he retired as chief artist. Later he reported that he had intended to stay with the paper for only two years and then open his own studio.

Schweitzer took over the illustration of the Weatherbird in 1981 following the retirement of Amadee Wohlschlaeger. Schweitzer frequently used a cigar and a bowtie on the Weatherbird. He was the first artist to consistently draw the character in color. Following Schweitzer's retirement from the newspaper in 1986, Dan Martin became the illustrator of the Weatherbird.

For eight years, Schweitzer created editorial cartoons for 44 Catholic newspapers in the United States and Canada. He received the Catholic Press Association Journalism award for Best Editorial Cartoon in 1961. He lost some newspapers due to his liberal stance on civil rights and his refusal to change his cartoons to the liking of southern editors.

Schweitzer was a member of the Missouri Athletic Club and served as its art director.

He taught art classes at Meramec Community College in Kirkwood, Missouri.

=== Personal life, death, and legacy ===
Schweitzer was inducted into the St. Louis Media History Foundation's Hall of Fame in 2017. He donated his papers to the St. Louis Mercantile Library.

Schweitzer lived in Brentwood, Missouri, a suburb of St. Louis. He was married and had two sons, Albert and Peter. Helene Soule Schweitzer, his wife, predeceased him in 2008.

Schweitzer died on Monday, January 30, 2023. He was buried at Resurrection Cemetery.
