= Herd (surname) =

Herd is a surname. Notable people with the surname include:

== People with the name ==
- Chris Herd (born 1989) Australian football player
- David Herd (anthologist) (1732–1810), Scottish anthologist
- David Herd (footballer) (1934–2016), Scottish former football player
- Fred Herd (1873–1954), Scottish professional golfer from St Andrews
- Richard Herd (1932–2020), American character actor in television and film
- Sandy Herd (1868–1944), Scottish professional golfer from St Andrews
- Stan Herd (born 1950), American earthworks artist from Kansas

== Fictional characters with the name ==
- Gregory Herd, character appearing in Marvel Comics stories

== See also ==
- Hurd (surname)
