= Allan Hird =

Allan Hird may refer to:

- Allan Hird Sr. (1918–2007), Australian rules footballer, grandfather of James Hird
- Allan Hird Jr. (born 1946), Australian rules footballer, father of James Hird
