= Heard =

Heard may refer to:

- Hearing, the ability to perceive sounds through an organ
- Heard (surname)
- The Heard, an American 1960s garage rock band
- Heard Island and McDonald Islands, an Australian external territory
- Heard County, Georgia, U.S.

== See also ==
- Herd (disambiguation)
- Hird
- Hurd (disambiguation)
