= Harry Hird =

English footballer

Personal information
- Full name: Henry Hird
- Date of birth: 30 July 1896
- Place of birth: Bolton, England
- Date of death: 1974 (aged 77–78)
- Position: Inside forward

Senior career*
Years	Team	Apps	(Gls)
1912–1913	Bolton Church Lads' Club		
1913–1914	Bolton Parish Church		
1914–1915	Horwich RMI		
1919–1922	Bury	63	(19)
1922–1923	Blackpool	4	(0)
1923–1924	Horwich RMI		
1924–1926	New Brighton	13	(3)
1926–1928	Horwich RMI		
1928-1930	Rossendale United	82	(42)
1931	Burscough Rangers		
1932	Horwich RMI		
Total		80	(22)
- * Club domestic league appearances and goals

Henry Hird (30 July 1896 – 1974) was an English footballer who played in the Football League for Blackpool, Bury and New Brighton.
