= Stelio Fenzo =

Italian comic book artist (1932–2022)

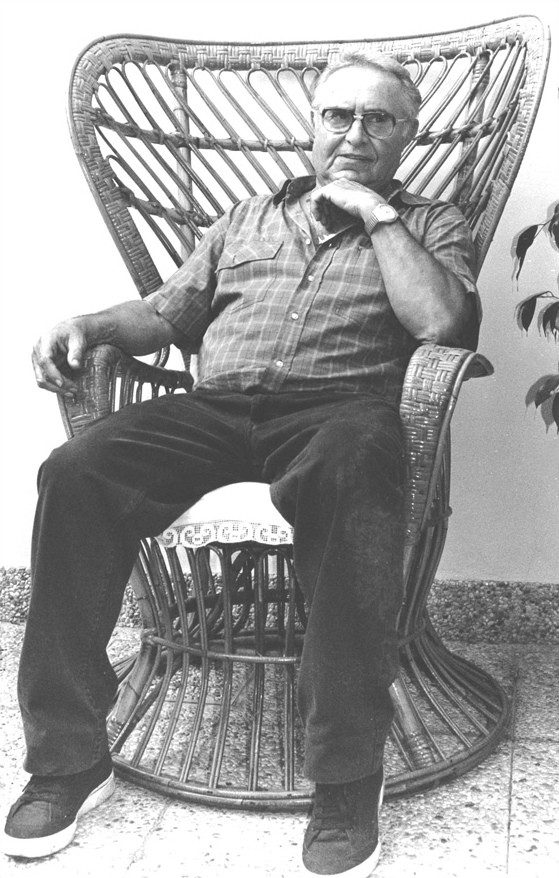
- Fenzo in 2000
- Born: 3 September 1932; Venice, Kingdom of Italy
- Died: 8 April 2022 (aged 89); Venice, Italy
- Occupation: Comic book artist

Stelio Fenzo (3 September 1932 – 8 April 2022) was an Italian comic book artist.

== Biography ==
After considering a career as an architect, he began writing comics in 1947. He joined the magazine L'Asso di Picche, becoming an assistant and friend to Hugo Pratt and publishing his first work, Indocina. He began working for Giornale illustrato in 1948 and Il Vittorioso in 1950.

In 1952, Fenzo left for England and worked for DC Thomson and Fleetway Publications for ten years. In 1962, he returned to Italy and created numerous series with Hugo Pratt, such as Capitaine Cormorant and Kiwi. In 1968, he turned to erotic comics, many of which were adapted into French, such as Contes Satyriques, Culbutant, Histoires Sanglantes, Outre-Tombe, and others.

Fenzo also collaborated with the Catholic magazine Il Giornalino, creating series such as I racconti del Saloon and Amar-Singh. He also adapted classic novels such as Kim and The Last of the Mohicans.

Stelio Fenzo died in Venice on 8 April 2022 at the age of 89.
