= William Woo =

American journalist

- Born: October 4, 1936; Shanghai
- Died: April 12, 2006 (aged 69); Palo Alto, California
- Education: University of Kansas
- Occupation: Journalist
- Years active: 1957–1996
- Known for: First Chinese American; Editor-in-chief of a major U.S. daily newspaper

William Franklin Woo (吳惠連, pinyin: Wú Huìlián; October 4, 1936 – April 12, 2006) was the first Chinese American to become editor of a major U.S. daily newspaper.

Woo was born in Shanghai to Kyatang Woo and American Elizabeth Hart, who met in the early '30s as graduate students at the University of Missouri School of Journalism. His parents divorced after World War II, and Woo and his mother moved to the United States in 1946 and settled in Kansas City, Missouri with her adoptive father.

Woo attended the University of Kansas and joined The Kansas City Times in 1957. From 1962 to 1996, Woo held a variety of posts at the St. Louis Post-Dispatch, founded by Joseph Pulitzer. In 1986, Woo became the first chief editor of the paper who was not named Joseph Pulitzer (there had been three). Joseph Pulitzer Jr., who had been Woo's mentor, died in 1995, and his half-brother, Michael Pulitzer, took over leadership of the company. In July 1996, Woo resigned under pressure to provide more bottom line - oriented leadership.

In September 1996, Woo became the Lorry I. Lokey visiting professor of professional journalism at Stanford University, a post he held until his death. He was a member of the Peabody Awards Board of Jurors from 1997 to 2003. Since 1999, he had also served as a visiting professor at the University of Hong Kong. When he died he was interim director of Stanford's Graduate Program in Journalism.

Woo was married three times, to Sonia Flournoy, Tricia Ernst Woo, and Martha Shirk. He and his wife, Martha Shirk, a former Post-Dispatch reporter and author of four books, were the parents of three sons (Thomas Woo of San Francisco, California; and Bennett Woo and Peter Woo, both of Palo Alto). Woo often wrote about his children in a column that appeared in the St. Louis Post-Dispatch from 1986 through his retirement.

Besides leaving behind wife Martha, he also left behind two half brothers (Robert C. Woo of St. Louis and John Woo of New York City); stepbrother Willie Woo of New York; half-sister Wendy Woo of San Mateo, California; and stepsister Elizabeth Li of Hong Kong.

Woo died of colon cancer at home in Palo Alto, California.

In 2007, the University of Missouri Press published "Letters from the Editor: Lessons from Journalism and Life," a collection of weekly letters that Woo wrote to his Stanford students about the craft of journalism. In his introduction, Philip Meyer, the editor, wrote: "The career of William F. Woo tracked what many of our generation once considered the golden age of newspaper journalism... For the students and journalists of the 21st Century, Bill Woo's platform is a reminder of the values worth preserving."
