= St. Louis Post-Dispatch =

Daily newspaper in Missouri, United States

- The November 7, 2026 front page of the St. Louis Post-Dispatch
- Type: Daily newspaper
- Format: Compact (March 23, 2009)
- Owner: Lee Enterprises
- Founder: Joseph Pulitzer
- Publisher: Ian Caso
- Editor: Alan Achkar
- Founded: December 12, 1878; 147 years ago
- Headquarters: 901 North 10th Street; St. Louis, Missouri 63101
- Circulation: 31,329 Average print circulation 52,887 Digital Subscribers
- ISSN: 1930-9600
- OCLC number: 1764810
- Website: stltoday.com

The St. Louis Post-Dispatch is a regional newspaper serving the St. Louis metropolitan area. Based in St. Louis, Missouri, it is the largest daily newspaper in the metropolitan area by circulation, surpassing the Belleville News-Democrat, Alton Telegraph, and Edwardsville Intelligencer. The publication has received 19 Pulitzer Prizes.

The paper is owned by Lee Enterprises of Davenport, Iowa, which purchased Pulitzer, Inc. in 2005 in a cash deal valued at $1.46 billion.

== Platform ==
On April 10, 1907, Joseph Pulitzer wrote what became known as the paper's platform:

I know that my retirement will make no difference in its cardinal principles, that it will always fight for progress and reform, never tolerate injustice or corruption, always fight demagogues of all parties, never belong to any party, always oppose privileged classes and public plunderers, never lack sympathy with the poor, always remain devoted to the public welfare, never be satisfied with merely printing news, always be drastically independent, never be afraid to attack wrong, whether by predatory plutocracy or predatory poverty.

== History ==
=== Early years ===
In 1878, Pulitzer purchased the bankrupt St. Louis Dispatch at a public auction and merged it with the St. Louis Evening Post to create the St. Louis Post and Dispatch, whose title was soon shortened to its current form. He appointed John A. Cockerill as the managing editor. Its first edition, 4,020 copies of four pages each, appeared on December 12, 1878.

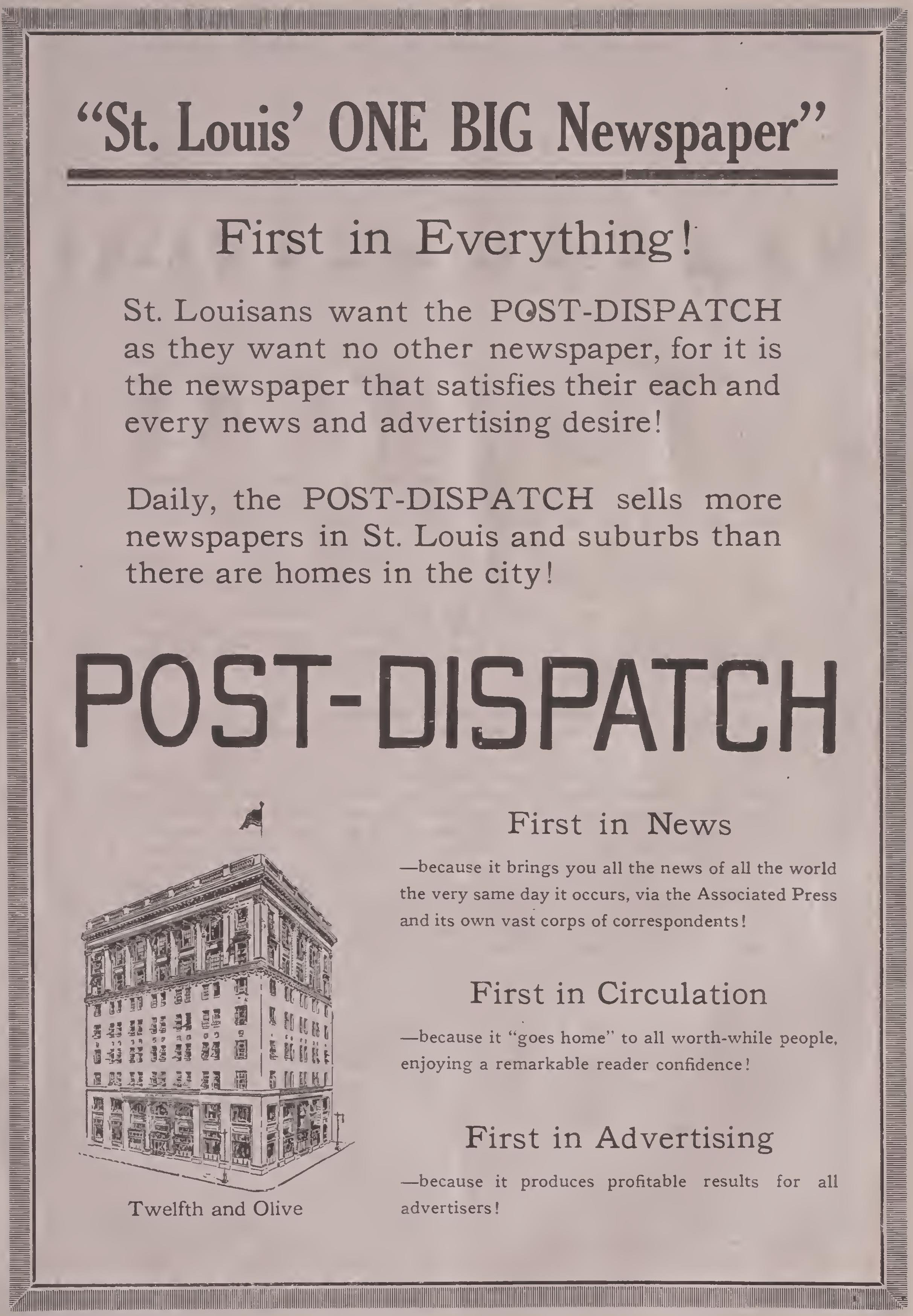
St. Louis Post-Dispatch ad in 1918

In 1882, James Overton Broadhead ran for Congress against John Glover. The St. Louis Post-Dispatch, at Cockerill's direction, ran a number of articles questioning Broadhead's role in a lawsuit between a gaslight company and the city; Broadhead never responded to the charges. Broadhead's friend and law partner, Alonzo W. Slayback, publicly defended Broadhead, asserting that the Post-Dispatch was nothing more than a "blackmailing sheet". The next day, October 13, 1882, Cockerill re-ran an offensive "card" by John Glover that the paper had published the prior year (November 11, 1881). Incensed, Slayback barged into Cockerill's offices at the paper demanding an apology. Cockerill shot and killed Slayback; he claimed self-defense, and a pistol was allegedly found on Slayback's body. A grand jury refused to indict Cockerill for murder, but the economic consequences for the paper were severe. In May 1883, Pulitzer sent Cockerill to New York to manage the New York World for him.

The Post-Dispatch was one of the first daily newspapers to print a comics section in color, on the back page of the features section, styled the "Everyday Magazine."

=== 20th century ===
At one time, the St. Louis Post-Dispatch had the second-largest news bureau in Washington, D.C., of any newspaper in the Midwestern United States.

After Joseph Pulitzer's retirement, generations of Pulitzers guided the newspaper, ending when great-grandson Joseph Pulitzer IV left the company in 1995.

The Post-Dispatch was characterized by a liberal editorial page and columnists, including Marquis Childs. The editorial page was noted also for political cartoons by Daniel R. Fitzpatrick, who won the 1955 Pulitzer Prize for editorial cartoons, and Bill Mauldin, who won the Pulitzer for editorial cartoons in 1959.

On May 22, 1946, the Post-Dispatch became the first newspaper in the world to publish the secret protocols for the 1939 Molotov–Ribbentrop Pact.

During the presidency of Harry S. Truman, the paper was one of his most outspoken critics. It associated him with the Pendergast machine in Kansas City, and constantly attacked his integrity.

In 1950, the Post-Dispatch sent a reporter, Dent McSkimming, to Brazil to cover the 1950 FIFA World Cup. The reporter paid for his own travelling expenses and was the only U.S. reporter in all of Brazil covering the event.

In 1959 the St. Louis Globe-Democrat entered into a joint operating agreement with the Post-Dispatch. The Post–Globe operation merged advertising, printing functions and shared profits. The Post-Dispatch, distributed evenings, had a smaller circulation than the Globe-Democrat, a morning daily. The Globe-Democrat announced it would fold in 1983, and followed through with that announcement three years later, leaving the Post-Dispatch as the only daily newspaper in the region.

In August 1973 a Teamsters union local representing Globe-Democrat and Post-Dispatch staffers went on strike, halting production for six weeks.

=== 21st century ===
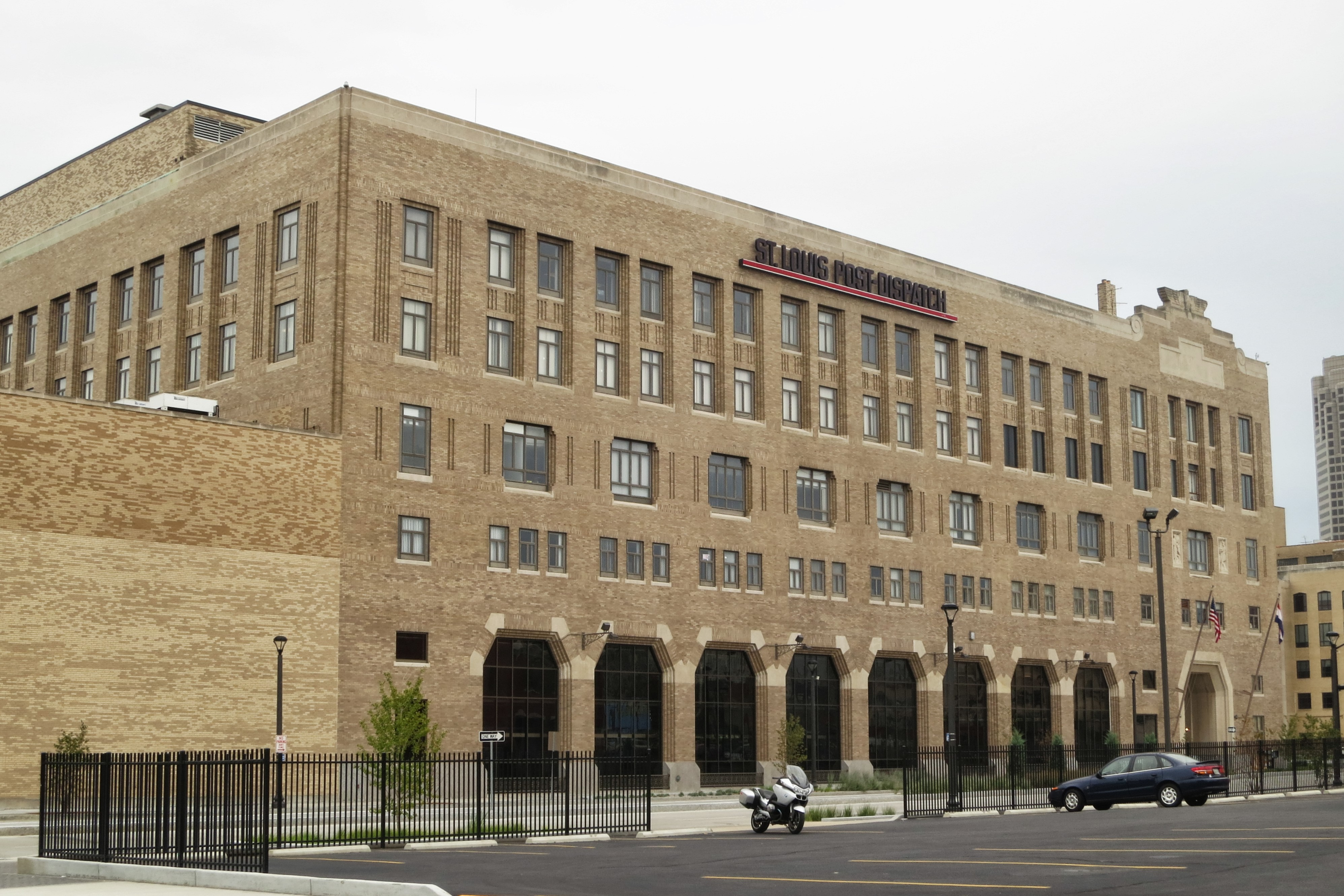
Former St. Louis Post-Dispatch headquarters

In September 2003, the Post-Dispatch accepted submissions for a 63rd anniversary special of Our Own Oddities, a lighthearted feature that ran from 1940 to 1991. The best submissions, including a duck-shaped cucumber and a woman born on December 7, 1941, with the initials W.A.R., were illustrated by Post-Dispatch artist Dan Martin and featured in the October 6, 2003, edition.

On January 13, 2004, the Post-Dispatch published a 125th-anniversary edition, which included some highlights of the paper's 125 years:

- Coverage of Charles Lindbergh, who flew across the Atlantic despite being denied financial or written support from the Post-Dispatch.
- A Pulitzer Prize-winning campaign to clean up smoke pollution in St. Louis. In the late 1930s and early 1940s, the city had the filthiest air in the United States.
- Sports coverage, including nine St. Louis Cardinals championships, an NBA title by the St. Louis Hawks in 1958, and the 2000 Super Bowl victory of the St. Louis Rams.
- Coverage of the city's "cultural icons" including Kate Chopin, Tennessee Williams, Chuck Berry, and Miles Davis.

On January 31, 2005, Michael Pulitzer announced the sale of Pulitzer, Inc. and all its assets, including the Post-Dispatch and a small share of the St. Louis Cardinals, to Lee Enterprises of Davenport, Iowa, for $1.46 billion. He said no family members would serve on the board of the merged company.

As of 2007, the Post-Dispatch was the fifth-largest newspaper in the midwestern United States and the 26th-largest newspaper in the U.S.

On March 12, 2007, the paper eliminated 31 jobs, mostly in its circulation, classified phone rooms, production, purchasing, telephone operations and marketing departments. Several rounds of layoffs have followed.

On March 23, 2009, the paper converted to a compact style every day from the previous broadsheet Sunday through Friday and tabloid on Saturday.

On May 4, 2012, the Post-Dispatch named a new editor, Gilbert Bailon.

In 2015, the paper was awarded the Pulitzer Prize for breaking news photography for its coverage of the Ferguson Uprising in Ferguson, Missouri.

In September 2024, six newsroom employees were laid off. The following month the paper announced it will shutter its St. Louis press facility and outsource to a printer in Columbia, Missouri. In total, 72 employees will lose their jobs.

In November 2025, the Post-Dispatch moved to a six day printing schedule, eliminating its printed Monday edition. Later in December, billionaire investor David Hoffmann became majority shareholder of Lee Enterprises.

In a February 2026 St. Louis Business Journal event, majority stockholder David Hoffmann announced his intention to move the company headquarters to Davenport, Iowa, and remarked that the newspaper was "a little too left" in news reporting and editorials. Hoffmann had purchased a majority share of Lee Enterprises after reportedly being unhappy with the Post-Dispatch's coverage of how his controversial $100 million investment plan to revitalize Augusta, Missouri, which promised helicopter tours and a golf course, collapsed and resulted in numerous lawsuits.

In March 2026, the Post-Dispatch started publishing AI-generated content under the direction of the new leadership.

=== Endorsements for U.S. president ===
Year	endorsement for president (*lost)	party
1972	George McGovern*	Democratic
1976	Jimmy Carter	Democratic
1980	Jimmy Carter*	Democratic
1984	Walter Mondale*	Democratic
1988	Michael Dukakis*	Democratic
1992	Bill Clinton	Democratic
1996	Bill Clinton	Democratic
2000	Al Gore	Democratic
2004	John Kerry*	Democratic
2008	Barack Obama	Democratic
2012	Barack Obama	Democratic
2016	Hillary Clinton*	Democratic
2020	Joe Biden	Democratic

== Circulation ==
Circulation dropped for the daily paper from 213,472 to 191,631 and then 178,801 for the two years after 2010, ending on September 30, 2011, and September 30, 2012, respectively. The Sunday paper also decreased from 401,427 to 332,825 and then to 299,227. The circulation as of September 30, 2016, was 98,104 daily and 157,543 on Sunday.

According to a 2017 press release from Lee Enterprises, the paper reaches more than 792,600 readers each week and stltoday.com has roughly 67 million page views a month.

== Weatherbird ==
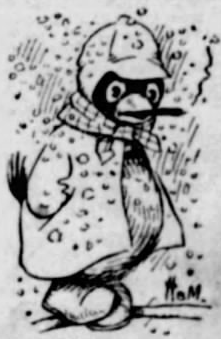
First appearance of the Weatherbird, February 11, 1901

On February 11, 1901, the paper introduced a front-page feature called the "Weatherbird", a cartoon bird accompanying the daily weather forecast. "Weatherbird" is the oldest continuously published cartoon in the United States. Created by Harry B. Martin, who drew it through 1903, it has since been drawn by Oscar Chopin (1903–1910); S. Carlisle Martin (1910–1932); Amadee Wohlschlaeger (1932–1981); Albert Schweitzer, the first one to draw the Weatherbird in color (1981–1986); and Dan Martin (1986–present).

== Notable people ==
- Jerry Berger, society columnist, 1980–2004
- Bob Broeg, Hall of Fame baseball writer, 1946–2004
- Jacob Burck, political cartoonist, 1937–1938
- Cole Charles Campbell, editor, 1996–2000
- Oscar Chopin, cartoonist, 1903–1910
- Richard Dudman, national affairs correspondent and Washington bureau chief, 1950–1981
- Daniel R. Fitzpatrick
- Derrick Goold, author and sportswriter
- Rick Hummel, Hall of Fame baseball writer, 1971–2023
- Clair Kenamore, foreign correspondent, telegraph editor, feature writer and Sunday magazine editor, early 20th century
- Joe Mahr, Pulitzer Prize–winning investigative journalist, 2006–2009
- Rose Marion (c. 1875–1947), feature writer
- Dan Martin, Weatherbird cartoonist
- Harry B. Martin, cartoonist and golf writer
- S. Carlisle Martin, cartoonist and illustrator
- Marguerite Martyn, reporter and artist (c. 1880–1948)
- Bill Mauldin, cartoonist
- Bernie Miklasz, sports columnist, 1985–2015
- Robert Minor, political cartoonist, 1907–1911
- Joseph Pulitzer, publisher
- Charlie Ross, chief Washington correspondent and editor, 1918–1945
- Neal Russo, baseball writer, 1947–1990
- Albert Schweitzer, cartoonist
- Elaine Viets, columnist, 1975–2000
- Rosa Kershaw Walker society column, 1870s
- Joe Williams, film critic, 1996–2015
- Amadee Wohlschlaeger, sports and Weatherbird cartoonist
- William Woo, journalist and editor-in-chief, 1962–1996

== See also ==
- St. Louis Globe-Democrat, a major competing St. Louis daily newspaper, located one block away on the same street, closed in 1986
- St. Louis Sun, a short-lived competing daily newspaper started in 1989
- 100 Neediest Cases, an annual charitable giving campaign sponsored in part by the Post-Dispatch
- Riverfront Times, a former St. Louis weekly newspaper
- The Sporting News, a sports magazine that was started in St. Louis
