= Oscar Chopin =

American artist (1873–1932)

Oscar Charles Chopin Jr. (September 24, 1873 – December 28, 1932) was an American artist known for his cartoon illustrations that appeared in several newspapers. He drew the St. Louis Post-Dispatch's Weatherbird cartoon from 1903 to 1910.

== Biography ==
Oscar Charles Chopin was born on September 24, 1873, to Oscar Chopin and Kate Chopin, a novelist, in St. Louis, Missouri.

Chopin worked in the Post-Dispatch art department from 1903 to 1910. He took over the illustration of the Weatherbird when creator Harry Martin left the newspaper. Chopin began using the Weatherbird character as a news cartoon. S. Carlisle Martin succeeded Chopin as the illustrator of the Weatherbird. Chopin also worked for the St. Louis Chronicle.

Chopin moved to California and became a cartoonist for the San Francisco Examiner. He drew political cartoons. He left that newspaper due to health problems in 1932, when he moved to the Los Angeles Examiner.

After traveling to Europe in search of an effective treatment for his health problems, Chopin died of heart disease in Los Angeles on December 28, 1932. He was buried in Calvary Cemetery in St. Louis in the family plot. He was survived by his wife, Louise Hinckley Chopin; his daughter, Kate Chopin; and other relatives.
