= Erel =

Erel can refer to:

- Erel Group, Mongolian company
- Erel (name), Hebrew and Turkish name
