= Hurd (band) =

Mongolian rock band

Hurd Хурд
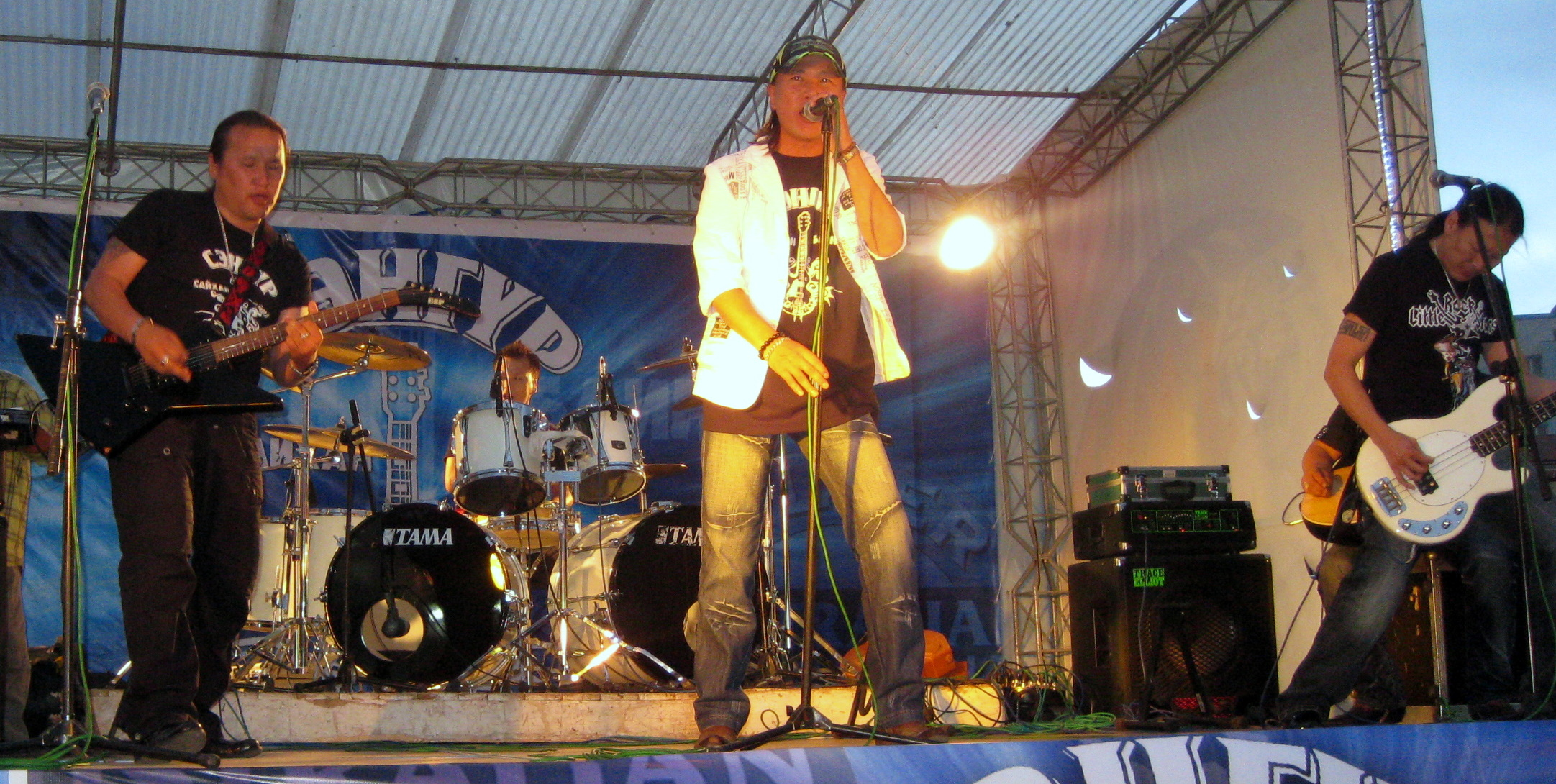
- Hurd at Grand Khan pub in 2009. From left to right: D.Otgonbayar, D.Otgonbaatar, D.Tömörtsog, N.Naranbaatar

Background information
- Also known as: Skorost / Скорость (1987–1993), Erel-Hurd / Эрэл-Хурд (1999)
- Origin: Ulaanbaatar, Mongolia
- Genres: Heavy metal, hard rock, rock and roll
- Years active: 1987–present
- Label: HURD
- Members: Dambyn Ganbayar; Dambyn Tömörtsog; Dambyn Otgonbayar; Dambyn Otgonbaatar; Namsraijavyn Naranbaatar; Dambyn Münkhbat
- Past members: T.Naranbaatar

Hurd (Mongolian: Хурд, [xʊrt], "speed") is a Mongolian rock band. Formed in 1987 as Skorost (Russian: Скорость, [ˈskorəsʲtʲ], also "speed") by drummer Dambyn Ganbayar, Hurd is considered the first band to have introduced the heavy metal genre into the Mongolian music landscape. Along with Chingis Khaan, Haranga or Niciton, they are considered "veterans" of the Mongolian pop rock scene, and, as such, they have greatly contributed to its diversification and encouraged the emergence of many new rock acts.

Hurd has released nine studio albums, one live album, one compilation album, two video albums and one box set. The band has won numerous Pentatonic Awards (Mongolia's equivalent of the Grammy Award) and Golden Microphone Awards. Guitarist Dambyn Otgonbayar is a member of the Pentatonic Academy. Drummer Dambyn Ganbayar is a board member of the Mongolian Drummers Association.

In November 2009, singer Dambyn Tömörtsog and bassist Namsraijavyn Naranbaatar were respectively awarded with the Merited Artist of Mongolia and the Polar Star awards.

== History ==
=== Early years (1987–1995) ===
In 1987, drummer Dambyn Ganbayar founded his first rock band with his fellow workers of Ulaanbaatar's train depot. The formation was dubbed Skorost by the depot's director, but Ganbayar renamed the group to the Mongolian Hurd. This early incarnation of Hurd won second place at the first Mongolian Pop and Rock Festival in 1989. As the members didn't really get along, this first line-up didn't last. In 1991, lead guitarist Dambyn Otgonbayar joined Hurd after having finished secondary school. He was followed the next year by bassist Namsraijavyn Naranbaatar. With the arrival of singer Dambyn Tömörtsog in 1993, this second formation was complete and thus began the modern band.

Rhythm guitarist T.Naranbaatar joined Hurd at some point between 1993 and 1995.

=== Best Collection I, Best Collection II, Unplugged (1995–1999) ===
Ticket to Hurd's Unplugged concert

The first major concert by Hurd, called Khar salkhi (Mongolian: Хар салхи, "black wind"), was held at the State Circus in March 1995. For this reason, Hurd is considered to be officially founded in 1995, although they were active since 1987.

Hurd started to be famous among music listeners, especially with the song Tsergiin bodol (Mongolian: Цэргийн бодол, "soldier's thoughts"), which quickly became a hit. From 1996 to 1997, Hurd made the Kharankhui (Mongolian: Харанхуй, "darkness") tour and released their first two albums - The Best Collection I and The Best Collection II. These albums are out of print today and have become rarities. Also in 1997, the band made their first tour outside of Mongolia, traveling to China's Inner Mongolia region.

Prior to 1993, the drummer's duties were filled by Ganbayar, until D.Otgonbaatar has joined the band. From that point on, Ganbayar concentrated more on the band's management and playing secondary instruments.

In another never-been-done move, in May 1998, Hurd held a series of acoustic concerts, later released on CD as Unplugged. The best of Hurd's songs were re-arranged for this event and performed accompanied by a string ensemble, a saxophonist, a morin khuur player and a pianist.

=== Ödör Shönö, Myangan Jild Gants, Best Collection III (1999–2003) ===
From 1999 to 2007, the band was under the patronage of Erel (a Mongolian mining company) and its owner B.Erdenebat. The founder of the Motherland Party provided the band with new equipment and a rehearsal space, in exchange for their electoral support and participation in the party campaigns. For the release of their 1999 album Ödör Shönö, the band used a new name - "Erel-Hurd" (Mongolian: Эрэл-Хурд), although it remains the sole occurrence other than a cassette tape compilation, Shildeg duu, from that era.

In 2001, the band released a third studio album, The Best Collection III. It contained the hit single Ekh oron, which was previously released in 1999, Ekh oron's B-sides and some more unreleased material from The Best Collection I and II's sessions, plus a new track, Shine jil, which was later put in their next album Myangan Jild Gants, which included nu metal styled songs.

=== Mongold Törsön, Züirlekh Argagüi, Talarkhalyn Kontsert, Unplugged II (2003–2009) ===
In 2004, they released Mongold Törsön, an album of patriotic songs, which was dedicated to the entire Mongol diaspora. The album is more hard rock and rock 'n roll based. In 2004, they experimented with industrial metal and recorded 16 songs with that theme, releasing them as Züirlekh Argagüi in 2005. On Naadam day, they played a concert in Sukhbaatar Square, releasing it as Talarkhalyn Kontsert in 2009.

In 2006, they recorded a second unplugged album, a DVD named Unplugged II, releasing it in 2009 (a CD version of the show was released in 2006 in Inner Mongolia).

In July 2007, when the band returned from a 4-month stay in the United States, Erel's managers ordered the band to leave the rehearsal space and ceased any further cooperation. The reasons that led the company management to proceed in that manner remain still unclear today.

Both sides came out of this 8-year partnership with their reputations damaged - the company for having exploited the band to achieve their political goals before rejecting them, and the band for having fraternized with politicians by interest.

Rhythm guitarist T.Naranbaatar has left Hurd at some point in late 2008 for undisclosed reasons.

=== Khairyn Salkhi, Black Box (2009–2014) ===
In 2010, they announced the release of their album Khairyn Salkhi, which contains 12 songs revolving around the theme of love. The album did not get released properly - only a few promotional card-sleeve CD copies, homemade CDrs and cassette tapes and at least one semi-official pressing for the Inner Mongolian market were released.

In 2013, they released a box set called "Black Box - 20th anniversary limited edition" which contains all their studio albums, "Unplugged", a CD version of "Acoustic Unplugged-II kontsert" and two bonus CDs, thus putting their older albums back into print and giving Khairyn Salkhi its first official release.

=== Narlag Divaajin and 7,000,000,000 (2014–present) ===
A new album, Narlag Divaajin, was recorded in 2014 and was released in 2016.

2018 marked Hurd's official 25th anniversary and the 40th anniversary of the song "Tsergiin bodol", originally written in 1978.

Hurd's ninth studio album 7,000,000,000 (7 Billion) was released in July 2021.

In 2023, Hurd celebrated its 30th anniversary with an Asian tour, including their first shows in Australia (they performed in Sydney and Perth).

== Style and lyrical themes ==
Influenced by heavy metal and hard rock bands such as Metallica, Iron Maiden, WASP, Judas Priest or Guns N' Roses, Hurd's earlier material was classic heavy metal. As their career unfolded, they kept on exploring rock music genres. Nu metal material was written for Myangan Jild Gants, whereas in Mongold Törsön the band displayed more rock and roll and hard rock influences. Züirlekh Argagüi saw the band's return to their heavy metal roots with a shade of industrial metal.

Some songs are reminiscent of traditional Mongolian music, using pentatonic scales, traditional melody styles and instruments, most notably morin khuur. Also characteristic are ballads, which often revolve around the theme of love, respect for parents or national pride. The band's roots in tradition and a focus on national pride make them especially popular in rural areas of Mongolia, as well as with Mongolian migrant workers abroad, such as in South Korea. They are also popular in China's Inner Mongolia Autonomous Region, and their sales figures for tapes and CDs are higher there than at home. When they first tried to enter into the Chinese market, they faced various problems: officials asked them to translate their lyrics from Mongolian into Chinese, and then banned some of them.

Hurd usually writes songs by composing music around proses and poems coming from either regular contributors or anonymous people.

== Members ==
Current members

- Dambyn Ganbayar (Дамбын Ганбаяр) - manager, percussion, keyboards, rhythm guitar
- Dambyn Tömörtsog (Дамбын Төмөрцог) - vocals
- Dambyn Otgonbayar (Дамбын Отгонбаяр) - lead guitar, vocals
- Dambyn Otgonbaatar (Дамбын Отгонбаатар) - drums, percussion
- Namsraijavyn Naranbaatar (Намсрайжавын Наранбаатар) - bass guitar, vocals
- Dambyn Münkhbat (Дамбын Мөнхбат) - rhythm guitar
- T.Naranbaatar (Т.Наранбаатар) - rhythm guitar (until 2008)

== Discography ==
- 1997: The Best Collection I
- 1997: The Best Collection II
- 1999: Ödör Shönö (Өдөр шөнө)
- 2001: Myangan Jild Gants (Мянган жилд ганц)
- 2003: Mongold Törsön (Монголд төрсөн)
- 2005: Züirlekh Argagüi (Зүйрлэх аргагүй)
- 2010: Khairyn Salkhi (Хайрын салхи)
- 2016: Narlag Divaajin (Нарлаг диваажин)
- 2021: 7,000,000,000 (Долоон тэрбум)
