= Amadee Wohlschlaeger =

American cartoonist

Amadee Wohlschlaeger (December 3, 1911 – June 24, 2014) was a 20th-century American sports cartoonist in St. Louis. He was known professionally as simply "Amadee", which was how he signed his cartoons. He was a long-time sports cartoonist for the St. Louis Post-Dispatch, in an era when newspaper sports pages usually included a prominent cartoon. He drew the Weatherbird cartoon for more than 49 years.

== Life and career ==
Wohlschlaeger was born on December 3, 1911, in St. Louis and grew up in the Carondelet neighborhood in the far south of that city, where he developed a passion for drawing when a small child. He did not attend high school (although he did later take art classes at Washington University in St. Louis). His father was a printer with the St. Louis Post-Dispatch, and the younger Wohlschlaeger took a job there at age 14, as a copy boy earning $7.50 (about $134.47 in 2024 dollars) a week. In 1929, at age 17, he was hired into the paper's art department.

In 1932, Wohlschlaeger became the fourth artist to draw the Post-Dispatch's Weatherbird, which was created in 1901 and remains in continuous daily use. He drew the Weatherbird, usually accompanied by a pithy observation on current events, from 1932 to 1981. His Weatherbird marked D-Day, the assassination of John F. Kennedy, and many other notable events. He was succeeded as illustrator by Albert Schweitzer.

Wohlschlaeger drew his first sports cartoon for the paper in 1936. Among his contributions was his "Cardinals Camp Capers" cartoon, sent in from spring training.

In 1939, he filled in as the Post-Dispatch's editorial cartoonist, drawing caricatures of Hitler and Mussolini as well as local politicians.

Wohlschlaeger drew many covers for the Sporting News, which was then produced in St. Louis and known as "The Baseball Bible". He also drew covers for University of Missouri football programs for more than 30 years, and covers for the annual St. Louis Baseball Writers dinner.

He was using a technique largely forgotten today. It was Ebony graphite and pencil on something called social board... Amadee actually learned a lot of this stuff from cartoonists in the 1890s. So you can make a direct line back from Amadee to 19th century newspapering almost.

— Dan Martin, Post Dispatch cartoonist dies at 102

Wohlschlaeger retired in 1981. He was inducted into the Missouri Sports Hall of Fame in 1992.

Wohlschlaeger was married to Violet Wohlschlaeger; they had a son, Amadee Wohlschlaeger Jr. Wohlschlaeger died June 24, 2014, in St. Louis County.

== Publications ==
- Reidenbaugh, Lowell (1983). Take Me Out to the Ball Park. Illustrated by Amadee. Sporting News. ISBN 978-0892041015.
