= Carlos Hurd =

American journalist (1876–1950)

Carlos F. Hurd (September 22 1876 – June 8 1950) was an American journalist, who wrote primarily for the St. Louis Post Dispatch.

== Titanic ==
In April 1912, Hurd and his wife boarded the RMS Carpathia for a two-month holiday. On the night of April 14, the Titanic sank in the Atlantic Ocean, and Hurd began recording the accounts of the disaster from the survivors, being noted as having to record stories on a roll of toilet paper. His report became one of the most notable recordings of the century.

Hurd died on June 8, 1950, and was buried at the Bellefontaine Cemetery in St. Louis.
