= Music of Mongolia =

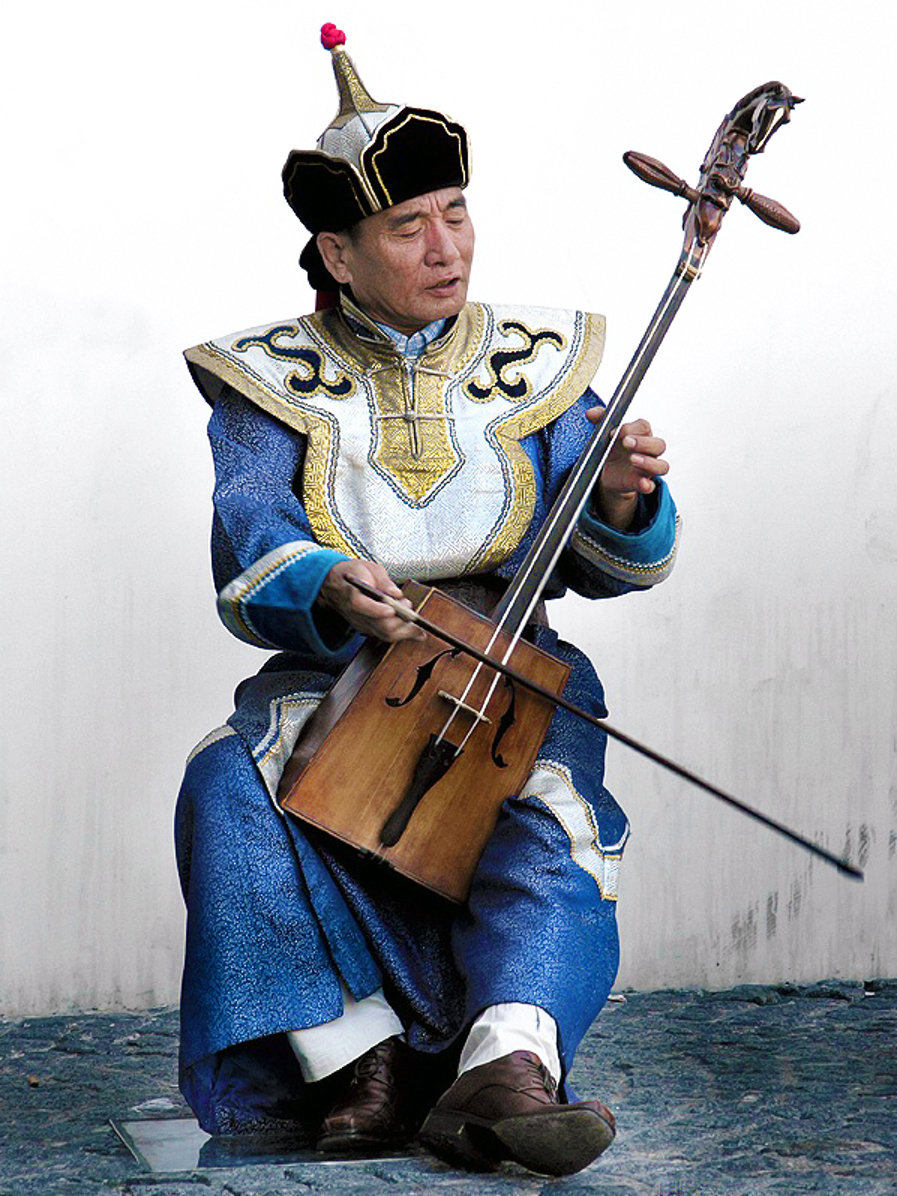
Sambuugiin Pürevjav of Altai Khairkhan playing a morin khuur

Music is an integral part of Mongolian culture. Among the unique contributions of Mongolia to the world's musical culture are the long songs, overtone singing, and morin khuur, the horse-headed fiddle, and the pentatonic scale. The music of Mongolia is also rich with varieties related to the various ethnic groups of the country: Oirats, Khotogoid, Tuvans, Darkhad, Buryats, Tsaatan, Dariganga, Uzemchin, Barga, and Khalkha Mongols.

Besides the traditional music, Western classical music and ballet flourished during the Mongolian People's Republic. Among the most popular forms of modern music in Mongolia are Western pop and rock genres and the mass songs, which are written by modern authors in a form of folk songs.

== Traditional music ==
=== Overtone singing ===
Overtone singing, known as höömij (throat), is a singing technique also found in the general Altai area. This type of singing is considered more as a type of instrument. It involves different ways of breathing: producing two distinctively audible pitches at the same time, one being a whistle like sound and the other being a drone bass. The sound is a result of locked breaths in the chest.

In Mongolia, the most famous throat-singers include Khalkhas like Gereltsogt and Sundui.

Khalkha singers have conceptualized Mongolian lyrical xöömei into several different styles while kharkhiraa remains a separate technique.

- uyangiin xöömii /melodic or lyrical xöömii
  - uruulyn / labial xöömii
  - tagnain /palatal xöömii
  - xamryn/ nasal xöömii
  - bagaIzuuryn, xooloin / glottal, throat xöömii
  - tseejiin xondiin, xeviiin / chest cavity, stomach xöömii
  - türlegt or xosmoljin xöömii / xöömii combined with long song

=== Long song ===
"Long songs" (Urtyin duu) are one of the main formats of Mongolian music. Firstly, when Genghis Khan first united Mongolia (13th century), many different tribes were brought together, and this allowed sharing of music that had not happened before. The song "Ertnii Saikhan" was a popular song at weddings and imperial meetings, and the song "Oyunt Khuu" was a popular song. The most distinguishing feature is that each syllable of text is extended for a long duration; a four-minute song may only consist of ten words. Other features are a slow tempo, wide intervals and no fixed rhythm. The richer and longer hold a singer has, the more appreciated the singer. Lyrical themes vary depending on context; they can be philosophical, religious, romance, or celebratory, and often use horses as a symbol or theme repeated throughout the song. Eastern Mongols typically use a morin khuur (horse-head fiddle) as accompaniment, sometimes with a type of indigenous flute named limbe. Oirat groups of the Western Mongols typically sing long songs unaccompanied or accompanied with the igil.

=== Court music ===
In neighboring China's autonomous region of Inner Mongolia, 15 notated chapters of the court music of the last Mongolian Great Khan Ligdan (1588–1634) were found in a temple near the ruins of his palace Chagan Haote (Ochirt Tsagan Khot). It was already known that the Qing Dynasty of China greatly valued Mongol court music and made it an integral part of its royal ceremonies, especially at feasts.

== Modern popular music ==
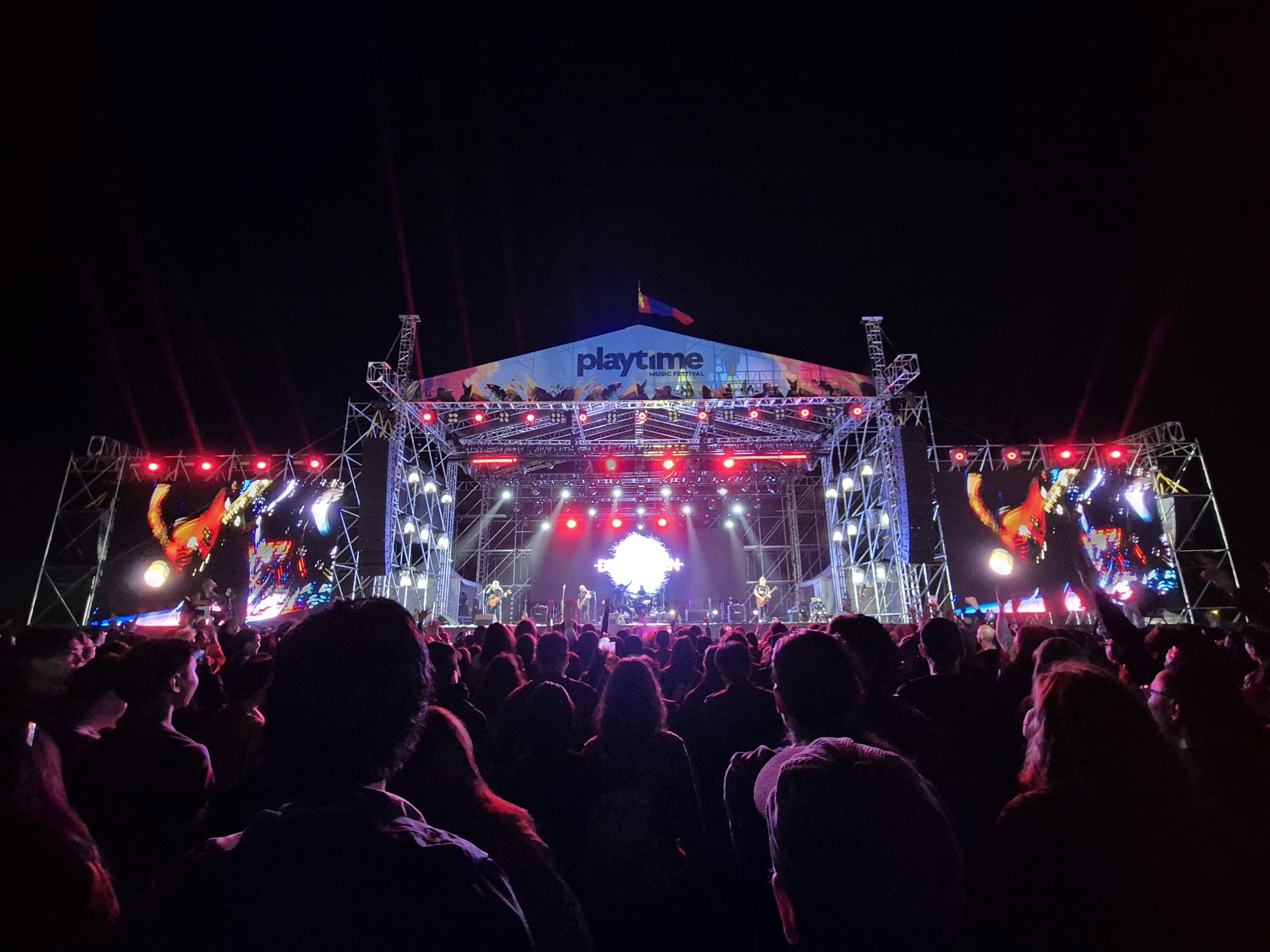
Playtime Festival, Mongolia's largest annual music festival

Largely unknown outside of Mongolia, there is a thriving popular music scene centred in the city of Ulaanbaatar, often subdivided into pop, contemporary R&B, EDM, rock, reggae, hip hop, and alternative (consisting of alternative rock and heavy metal).

The pop/R&B/EDM scene includes solo artists, such as the renowned Ariunaa, also Altantsetseg (a.k.a. Altaa), Ankhmaa, Bayartsetseg, Bold, BX, B.Azzaya, Chuluunchimeg, Delgermörön, Erdenechimeg, Erdenetsetseg, Gangaa, Hishigdalai, Jargalsaikhan.D, Khaliun, Maraljingoo, Michelle, Onon, Sarantuya (a.k.a. Saraa), Serchmaa, Uka, Zaya and others, the mixed-gender group Classic Gem, boy bands like Camerton, Nomin Talst and Motive, and girl groups like 3 Ohin, Anemone, Extacy, Foux, Gala, HoneyMoon, Kiwi, Lipstick, Sound of Kiss, SweetYmotion and The Wasabies. There are also EDM musicians and singers such as Odonbat & MO (Munkh-Orgil), and others. A few of the younger Mongolian popular artists are becoming increasingly well-established internationally, most notably, the young female singer Nominjin (singing in eight languages in a variety of genres), singer Enguun, the winner of the season 1 of The Voice of Mongolia, and Amarkhuu Borkhuu, a star of the Russian pop music.

The alternative scene bands include A-sound, Magnolian, Nisvanis, Night train, Otgoo, and The Lemons, the rock scene like the Pilots and Soyol Erdene, folk rock like Altan Urag, Jonon, The HU and Khusugtun, as well as hard rock bands like Chinggis khaan, Growl of Clown, Haranga, Hurd and Niciton. There are also some reggae singers like JiiJah, Macho and RatAbuZz, and techno bands such as the techno-rap bands Khar Sarnai and Khar Tas.

Among the Mongolian lyricists, the socialist-period dissident poet Ryenchinii Choinom stands out, nowadays, many of his love lyrics became popular songs and hip-hop compositions influence.

=== Hip hop and pop rap ===
Hip-hop/Rap has gained considerable popularity in Mongolia. From the early 1990s, Mongolian teenagers and youngsters formed dancing groups with anywhere between three and thirty members that started to compete in national tournaments. This was the beginning of the Mongolian hip-hop movement. For some reason, single rappers had never "made it" into the Mongolian hip-hop scene. Although, the Mongolian-Swedish rapper Battulga Munkhbayar, also known as The yellow Eminem and 50 öre, has made it to the big stages in Sweden because of his unique rap style. He wasn't so successful as a pickpocket on the streets of Bangkok, though, being arrested there for thieving a Slovak tourist's wallet in 2019.

Early bands include Khar Tas and Khar Sarnai. The latter two groups represented the beginning of rap in Mongolia. Their techno-rap compositions mostly stressed social issues, philosophy and rebellious ideas. A later generation consisted of bands and solo artists who had appear at the second half of the 1990s like 2 Khüü, Dain ba Enkh, Ice Top, Lumino, MCIT, as well as during the first decade of the 21st century like 4 Züg, B.A.T, Big Gee (a.k.a. Gee), Click Click Boom, Digital, Enkhtaivan, Epoch, Erkh-Chölöö, Gangsta Service, Metune, Mon-Ta-Rap, NC, Aka Odko, PacRap, Quiza, Rokit Bay, Seryoja, Tatar, Tempo, ThunderZ, Tsetse, URMC, Vainquish, Vande, XL, Young Mo'G, and female rappers Gennie, Hulan, Mvchi, Babynna, and N.M.N. They continued with similar messages as their predecessors but also came to include “soft” touches in their songs, which faced strong resistance from hardcore rap fans but were welcomed by the general public.

=== Popular folk music ===
There is also a "Mongolian pop" genre that occupies the same place on the musical spectrum as Japanese Enka music or Western soft-pop-oriented folk music or country music. Classic singers from the late 20th and early 21st centuries include Vandan and Dulamsüren, Batsükh, Tömörkhuyag and Egschiglen. Some of the repeatedly heard lyrical themes are very distinctive for Mongolia: heartfelt tributes to the songwriter's mother, for example, or paeans to great horses.

Mongolian popular folk music is not considered world music in the west and was long generally unavailable outside Mongolia, but can now be downloaded from various Mongolian websites. It may be filed under the designation Zohioliin Duu (Зохиoлын Дyy) (schlagers). In the Mongolian language, duu means song; and the genitive word zohioliin derives from the noun for a literary composition. A typical zohioliin duu may include three four-line stanzas and a refrain. The lyrics of zohioliin duu, like those of Mongolian folk poetry, tend to be alliterative. Often, the lines of a zohioliin duu share not only initial letters, but also initial syllables.

== Classical music ==
Mongolia features a rich tradition of classical music and ballet. The classical music owes its prosperity in the 2nd half of the 20th century to a patronage of then Socialist government that favoured Western and Russian/Soviet classical arts to Western pop culture. In addition, the Mongolian composers developed a rich diversity of national symphony and ballet.

== Musical Instruments ==
=== Horse-head fiddle ===
The horse-head fiddle, or morin khuur, is a distinctively Mongolian instrument and is seen as a symbol of the country. The instrument has two strings. There is some controversy regarding the traditional carving of a horse on the upper end of the pegbox. Some scholars believe that this is proof that the instrument was originally a shamanistic instrument. The staffs of shamans have a horse similarly carved on top; the horse is a much-revered animal in Mongolia.

=== Other traditional instruments ===
Other instruments used in Mongolian traditional music include the shudraga or shanz (a three-stringed, long-necked, strummed lute similar to the Chinese sanxian or Japanese shamisen), khuuchir (a bowed spike-fiddle), yatga (a plucked zither related to the Chinese guzheng), everburee (a folk oboe), khel khuur (Jew's harp), tobshuur (a plucked lute similar to the dombra), ikh khuur (bass morin khuur), and bishhuur (a pipe similar in sound to a clarinet).

== See also ==
Mongolians singing a folk song
A one-minute video of Mongolians singing a folk song around the campfire. Video is very dark, mainly for audio.

- Culture of Mongolia
- Music of Inner Mongolia
- Music of Buryatia
- Music of Kalmykia
- Music of Tuva
- Music of East Asia
- Bukhchuluun Ganburged
