= Praise of Bogdiin Khuree =

Mongolian folk song

Song
- Language: Mongolian
- Genre: Mongolian folk

Praise of Bogdiin Khuree, also known as Praise of Bogd Dunjingarav, is a Mongolian folk song praising the city of Urga (now known as Ulaanbaatar) in Mongolia.

== History and structure ==
According to legend the song was originally sung by a man condemned to death who was pardoned his punishment after turning to look back at the city and singing its praises. Structurally and stylistically the song follows the pattern of traditional Mongolian epics in the way it frames its praise. Mount Bogd Khan Uul is called "Dunjingarav" which is its Tibetan name (e.g. "Khagan Dunjingarav", "Bogd Dunjingarav" and "Baghatur Dunjingarav").

The song dates back to the era of Manchu dominance (1691–1911) and includes references to Manchu imperial decrees (zarlig) the local Manchu governor (amban) and the Chinese commercial district (naimaa khot). It praises various aspects of Urga: its location at the foot of "savior Dunjingarav" where the "golden Tuul" river flows, its civil, religious, military and police administration, its "rich markets", its "80 elbow tall Maitreya statue" (built in 1833 and destroyed with its temple in 1933), its innumerable monasteries filled with "quick-witted disciples", its caravans and endless pilgrims.

The detailed praise of Mount Bogd Khan Uul in the beginning follows the Mongolian epic tradition of praising the natural surroundings of the camp of a hero (in this case the "khuree" or camp of the Jebtsundamba Khutuktu). The first part with lyrics relating to Mount Dunjingarav was included in Egschiglen's rendering of the song using the original melody (YouTube link ).

== Versions ==
The song exists in various versions with differing lyrics, the earliest of which is probably that of Dash Khuurch as documented in Tseveen Jamtsarano's book "Obraztsy mongol'skoi narodnoi literatury", published in St. Petersburg in 1908. Other written versions include the storyteller Togtool's version kept in the Oral Literature Library of the Literature Academy, and Omnogobi province commune herder Nansalmaagiin Chuluunjav's version. The song is said to have been composed by Norov Khuurch (meaning Norov the morin khuur player) of Urga.

It is featured in the soundtrack of "A Little Bit Mongolian", a documentary film about an Australian boy who travels to Mongolia to compete in a horse race.
