= Wasabi (disambiguation) =

Wasabi (Latin name Wasabia japonica) is also called Japanese horseradish.

Wasabi may also refer to:

== In arts and entertainment ==
=== Characters ===
- Wasabi, in the Sinfest webcomic
- Wasabi, in the TV series Thumb Wrestling Federation
- Wasabi-No-Ginger, a character from Big Hero 6
- Dr. Wasabi, in the cartoon series Chop Socky Chooks
- Wasabi Pow, in the cartoon Sushi Pack

=== Films ===
- Wasabi (film), France, 2001

=== Music ===
- "Wasabi" (Lee Harding song), 2005
- "Wasabi" (Little Mix song), 2018
- "Sci-Fi Wasabi", a song by Cibo Matto
- The Wasabies, a Mongolian girl group

== In computing ==
- Wasabi (software), GUI toolkit
- WASABI architecture, an approach for emotion simulation
- Wasabi Technologies, US object storage service provider

== In other uses ==
- Wasabi (restaurant), UK chain
- Wasabi Mizuta, Japanese voice actor

== See also ==
- Wassabi, Romanian musical group
