= Tumur Khurlat =

Mongolian pop singer (1944–1995)

Tumur Khurlat, or Khurlatiin Tumur (Cyrillic Mongolian: Хурлатын Төмөр, born on 23 March 1944- died in 1995) was a Mongolian pop singer. In 1999 Tumur was posthumously named "Estrada (Pop) Male Singer of the Century" (Зууны манлай эстрадын дуучин) by the media, in recognition of his pioneering role in introducing Western-influenced pop singing to Mongolia. He is best known for the 1968 song "Ayanii Shuvuud" ("Migratory Birds"), widely regarded as one of the first true pop compositions in Mongolian music.

== Family Background and Childhood ==
Khurlatiin Tumur was born on 23 March 1944, in Ulaanbaatar, the third child of Vera Viktorovna. Viktorovna's husband Ch. Khurlat graduated from Springfield Technical Community College in Ohio as a thermal engineer, and was the first Mongol engineer to have done an internship at a Ford factory in the United States. Tumur's mother Vera Viktorovna was a librarian of Russian German ancestry.

After returning to Mongolia, Khurlat played a role in developing business ties with Germany and France and in arranging for Mongolian students to study in Western Europe. In November 1937, amid the political purges, Khurlat was convicted on political charges by a special commission of the Mongolian People's Republic's Ministry of Internal Affairs and executed, leaving Vera Viktorovna a widow at 29 with two young children — a four-year-old son, Jan, and an infant daughter, Karma. Tumur, her third child, was born seven years later and took his nominal father Ch. Khurlat's given name as a patronymic, becoming widely known throughout his life by the surname "Khurlatyn."

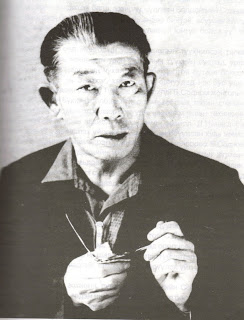
Tumur's biological father, Sodnom Baldan

The Mongolian writer, philologist and scholar Sodnom Baldan was a biological father of Tumur, however, Viktorovna refused to marry him.

Tumur spent his early years in a residential building near the Choijin Lama Temple in Ulaanbaatar, nicknamed "Khureelen," home to staff of the State Public Library and the Academy of Sciences. Neighbors recalled him as an energetic, attention-drawing child nicknamed "Temka," who staged puppet-theater shows cut out from issues of the Soviet children's magazine Murzilka, sang, danced, and played guitar for the neighborhood children.

== Education ==
Tumur completed ten years of schooling at School No.1 of Ulaanbaatar, then named after Kh. Choibalsan, graduating in 1961. He then worked for about a year as a Russian-language interpreter at a construction trust building housing in the capital's newly developed 40th and 50th micro-districts.

In 1962 he enrolled in the Faculty of Economics at the Moscow State Institute of International Relations (MGIMO) in the USSR and studied there until 1966. In 1963, a government resolution rehabilitated several men connected to his family and to Mongolian history — including his non-biological father Ch. Khurlat — clearing their names of the earlier political charges, an event Tumur considered one of the most significant of his life.

Considerably later, from 1977 to 1979, he completed an undergraduate program of the English-Language Department at the National University of Mongolia (NUM), earning a professional qualification as an English translator.

== Music career ==
=== Early Formation ===
While at MGIMO during 1962–1966, Tumur became captivated by Western music, particularly the Beatles, and adopted the style of the stilyagi, Soviet youth subculture influenced by Western fashion and music, even as many of his Soviet peers were devoted to singers such as Muslim Magomayev and the twist dance craze. He became lead singer of "Khurgachin," a band formed with fellow Mongolian students in Moscow. The group performed both Russian and Mongolian songs, but became notable as the first Mongolian musical act to perform twist-style dance music and Beatles songs — though only for the small community of Mongolian students in the USSR, never at home. After roughly two years, Tumur was expelled from the institute following an incident: while drunk at a reception held at the Mongolian embassy, he argued with a dormitory supervisor over bringing a female companion into his room, an episode that reached both the university administration and the Mongolian embassy and revived an earlier disciplinary matter. Classmate and bandmate L. Dashnyam — later a scholar, writer, translator, and honored cultural figure — tried to intervene to keep Tumur from being expelled, but Tumur refused help, reportedly saying he was not without a homeland and that his life would not end simply because he had to leave.

=== Debut in Mongolia ===
Tumur returned to Mongolia from Moscow in 1966, after dropping out from MGIMO over a dispute at the university dormitory. Soon afterward he became a drummer with the jazz ensemble at the Builders' Palace of Culture. There he began a short but influential collaboration with Zundui Khangal, who would go on to become one of Mongolia's leading modern composers and a State Prize laureate. Their first joint composition was "Ayanii Shuvuud" ("Migratory Birds," lyrics by D. Dashdondog), which premiered at a 1966–1967 New Year celebration for arts workers, with Khangal on piano, O. Begz (a teacher at the Music and Dance Secondary School) on violin, and Tumur singing. The song was formally recorded for Mongolian radio in 1968 and quickly became a nationwide hit, marking — in the recollection of composer and honored cultural figure R. Enkhbazar — the first time Mongolian audiences heard a distinctly new, Western-influenced musical current sung by a Mongolian voice. It was this song that gave rise to Tumur's enduring public identity as "Tumur of the Migratory Birds."

=== 1968–1969: Prime Creative Period ===
Between 1968 and 1969, while Khangal taught piano at the Music and Dance Secondary School and Tumur worked there as a translator, the pair produced four more hit songs in quick succession: "Sarnai Tsetseg" ("Rose Flower"), "Khairyn Khishig" ("Blessing/Gift of Love"), "Nart Tengeriin Dor" ("Under the Sunny Sky"), and "Shine Ony Uyanga" ("New Year's Melody"). In 1969, Tumur also recorded two songs composed by O. Begz: "Udeltiin Duu" ("Song of the Feast") and "Bidnii Duulakh Durtai Duu" ("The Song We Love to Sing"). After this period, Khangal and Tumur never again collaborated on new material; Khangal went on to study at the Urals Mussorgsky State Conservatoire and later devoted himself mainly to classical and film composition, becoming a leading figure of what is described as the "second wave" of Mongolian professional music, alongside composers such as Byambasuren Sharav and Natsagiin Jantsannorov.

=== Career outside music ===
Because his songs were not accompanied by television appearances during the socialist period — reportedly partly because his mixed European appearance was thought unsuitable for representing Mongolia internationally, and he was barred from joining Mongolian delegations of estrada singers, including one to Bulgaria — Tumur remained primarily known by voice rather than by face for two decades. During this period he worked as a translator and administrator in various state institutions: at the "Tekhnikimport" association under the Ministry of Foreign Trade (1969–1977); as a translator/reference specialist at the General Administration of the Hydrometeorological Service, as an operator-English translator at the Information and Computing Center, and as an English translator at MIAT Mongolian Airlines, continuing into the early 1990s.

=== 1989 return to the stage ===
In 1989, D. Ukhnaa, then head of the State Philharmonic, organized a concert of veteran estrada singers at the Central Palace of Culture and invited Tumur to perform — his first public stage appearance in roughly two decades. People's Artist of Mongolia D. Ukhnaa later recalled that over the concert's sixteen performances, there was not a single day when the hall was not full, as many attendees who had grown up listening to Tumur's songs on the radio for twenty years had never actually seen him perform.

== Film career ==
Around 1990, while preparing to direct a full-length feature film based on her own story "Argamjaa," writer and director N. Uranchimeg was searching for an actor to play the leader of a gang of thieves, Sainaa. She recalled encountering Tumur — whose songs she knew but whose face she had never seen — by chance and casting him on the spot for his striking presence; she described him as disciplined, quiet on set, and charismatic, and recalled a remark he once made about his mother's thinning hair that stuck with her for its childlike tenderness.

== Personal life ==
In the 1970s, Tumur married P. Narangoo, an officer of the Ministry of Foreign Trade, and the couple had two daughters. Their marriage later ended in divorce; his sister, Kh. Karma, attributed the breakup partly to Tumur's increasing drinking. After the divorce, Tumur lived alone for about twenty years and lost contact with his ex-wife and daughters. His father-in-law, Puntsagnorov, a former deputy chairman of the Council of Ministers, was reportedly fond of "Ayanii Shuvuud," though his granddaughters, separated from their father while still very young, may never have known he was the one who sang it.

His sister Kh. Karma later pushed back publicly against rumors that circulated after her brother's death suggesting he had been targeted over a same-sex relationship, describing such claims as baseless and noting that his household skills and mannerisms had sometimes been misread by others; in 2020 she said Tumur had been living alone for two decades and had spoken of plans to marry a woman named Badamkhorol just prior to the murder.

== Murder ==
In 1995, Tumur and his girlfriend Badamkhorol were murdered in his home in a killing that shocked Mongolian society. Accounts of the case differ. It is alleged that Tumur was a homosexualist and was murdered by his male lover out of jealousy. A former head of the Criminal Police Department, Colonel Z. Tormandakh, said in a 2014 interview that a suspect named Batsukh was formally found responsible through a three-level court process, though he noted the case was still viewed by some legal professionals as unresolved or contested.

In a 2017 interview, defense lawyer Nyamjaviin Batbayar gave a different account, saying the case — in which Tumur was decapitated and his head placed in an oven — had never truly been solved; he stated that a young man named Ts. Batsukh had been implicated after the Supreme Court had already overturned an earlier maximum sentence, and that the case was effectively closed against him only after he died in Gants Khudag, by which point he had no way to contest the charge. Batbayar pointed to forensic evidence at the scene — a shoe print, fingerprints on a Chinese liquor bottle, and hair pulled from Tumur's partner Badamkhorol, who was also killed — that he said matched neither Batsukh nor Badamkhorol, suggesting other individuals were present. He characterized the man ultimately blamed as someone with apparent mental illness onto whom the case was conveniently closed.

For 25 years, no perpetrator was conclusively and permanently established to the satisfaction of all parties involved, and the case was formally closed as a case of wrongful/undetermined resolution by those who signed the closing court documents.

== Legacy ==
After his death, Tumur's reputation was for a time subjected to sensational and disparaging tabloid coverage due to the cruelty of his death and alleged sexual orientation.

In 1999, the Mongolian newspaper Zuunii Medee (Зууны Мэдээ), Mongolian National Radio, and the Montsame conducted a public poll among readers, listeners, and viewers to select the "Pop Singers of the Century." Sixty-three percent of participants voted for the late Khurlatyn Tumur the male winner, alongside the Mongolian pop diva B. Sarantuya as the female winner.

== Musical style ==
Honored Artist and People's Artist Natsagiin Jantsannorov, a Hero of Labor and State Prize laureate, described Tumur's singing style as an entirely new phenomenon in Mongolian music and the beginning of modern Mongolian pop, calling him "Mongolia's Demis Roussos" for his ability to convey deep emotional comfort through voice alone. Jantsannorov contrasted Tumur's approach with the two dominant singing traditions of the time — Western classical-style composed songs and traditional folk-style delivery — noting that Tumur belonged to neither, instead singing with a soft, inward-drawing delivery rather than projecting outward vocal power.

Honored artist B. Dolgion likewise recalled that Tumur, who had a slight limp not noticeable while dancing, cultivated a distinctive personal style — tinted glasses, stylish scarves and hats, white trousers, and patent shoes — and later, in the early 1990s, personally produced music videos for some of his songs, which are still available online.

Some observers have suggested that Tumur and Khangal's work preceded Mongolia's first officially organized rock/pop band, Soyol Erdene, which was founded in 1971, in some respects, though the latter used electric instrumentation Tumur's early recordings did not.

== Songs ==
- "Migratory Birds" (lyrics by D. Dashdondog, music by Z. Khangal)
- "The Song We Love to Sing" (lyrics by Sh. Shazhinbat, music by O. Begz)
- "Blessing of Love" / "Gift of Love" (lyrics by N. Ochirbat, music by Z. Khangal)
- "Moscow, How Are You"
- "Under the Sunny Sky" (lyrics by J. Yondonsambuu, music by Z. Khangal)
- "Rose Flower" (lyrics by Sh. Shazhinbat, music by Z. Khangal)
- "Song of the Feast/Banquet" (lyrics by Sh. Shazhinbat, music by O. Begz)
- "New Year's Melody" (lyrics by D. Dashdondog, music by Z. Khangal)
- "Winter Evening" (from a poetry collection, music by Z. Khangal)

== See also ==
- Music of Mongolia
- Mongolian People's Republic
