= List of Melodiya artists =

List of recording artists performing on or signed to Melodiya at one time or another.

== A ==
- ABBA (pop group)
- Alexander Alexeev (conductor)
- Karel Ančerl (conductor)
- Aria (Russian metal band)
- Vladimir Ashkenazy (pianist, conductor)

== B ==
- Rudolf Barshai (violist)
- Dimitri Bashkirov (pianist)
- The Beatles (rock band)
- Black Sabbath
- Lazar Berman (pianist)
- Bon Jovi
- Borodin String Quartet
- Mikhail Boyarsky (singer)

== C ==
- Eric Clapton (song 'Cocaine' omitted from Slowhand album)
- Bing Crosby
- Creedence Clearwater Revival
- Credo

== D ==
- Dalida
- Dave Rave (Dave Rave Group)
- Deep Purple
- Dire Straits

== F ==
- Vladimir Fedoseyev (conductor)

== G ==
- Anna German (singer)
- Grigory Ginzburg (pianist)
- Emil Gilels (pianist)
- Dizzy Gillespie (jazz trumpeter)
- Peter Gabriel

== I ==
- Julio Iglesias

== J ==
- Mahalia Jackson

== K ==
- Leonid Kogan (violinist)
- Kiril Kondrashin (conductor)
- Vladimir Krainev (pianist)
- Eduard Khil (singer)
- Eson Kandov (singer)
- Kino (post-punk band)

== L ==
- Heli Lääts (mezzo-soprano)
- Valentina Levko (mezzo-soprano)
- Uno Loop
- John Lennon
- Led Zeppelin

== M ==
- The Mamas & the Papas
- Muslim Magomayev (musician)
- Paul McCartney (musician)
- Tamara Milashkina (soprano)
- Mister Twister (band)
- Mashina Vremeni (band)
- Anatoliy Mokrenko (baritone)
- Yevgeny Mravinsky (conductor)
- The Moody Blues

== N ==
- Alexandre Naoumenko (tenor)
- Nautilus Pompilius (band)
- Tatiana Nikolayeva (pianist)
- Heinrich Neuhaus (pianist)
- Stanislav Neuhaus (pianist)

== O ==
- David Oistrakh (violinist)

== P ==
- Oscar Peterson (jazz pianist)
- Nikolai Petrov (pianist)
- Viktoria Postnikova (pianist)
- Alla Pugacheva (singer)
- Raimonds Pauls (pianist)
- Đorđi Peruzović (singer)
- Pink Floyd

== R ==
- Sviatoslav Richter (pianist)
- Mstislav Rostropovich (cellist)
- Gennadi Rozhdestvensky (conductor)
- Sofia Rotaru (singer)
- Russya (Ukrainian pop star, one of the last acts to release an album on the Melodiya label)
- Cliff Richard
- Kenny Rogers
- The Rolling Stones

== S ==
- Samuel Samosud (conductor)
- Kurt Sanderling (conductor)
- Daniil Shafran (cellist)
- Dmitri Shostakovich (pianist)
- Shostakovich Quartet
- Alexander Slobodyanik (pianist) aka Slobodyanik, Aleksander
- Grigory Sokolov (pianist)
- Vera Soukupova (mezzo-soprano)
- Soyol Erdene (rock band)
- Yevgeny Svetlanov (conductor, composer, and pianist)
- Henryk Szeryng (violinist)

== T ==
- Taneyev Quartet
- Anahit Tsitsikian (violinist)
- Tsvety (rock band)
- The Second Half (progressive rock band)
- Pete Townshend

== V ==
- Vladimir Viardo (pianist)
- Eliso Virsaladze (pianist)
- Galina Vishnevskaya (soprano)
- Mikhail Voskresensky (pianist)
- Vladimir Vysotsky (singer/songwriter)
- Vyacheslav Mescherin

== Y ==
- Vladimir Yampolsky (pianist)
- Yuri Antonov (singer)

== Z ==
- Yakov Zak (pianist)
- Zodiaks/Zodiac
