= Mongolian hip-hop =

Mongolian music genre

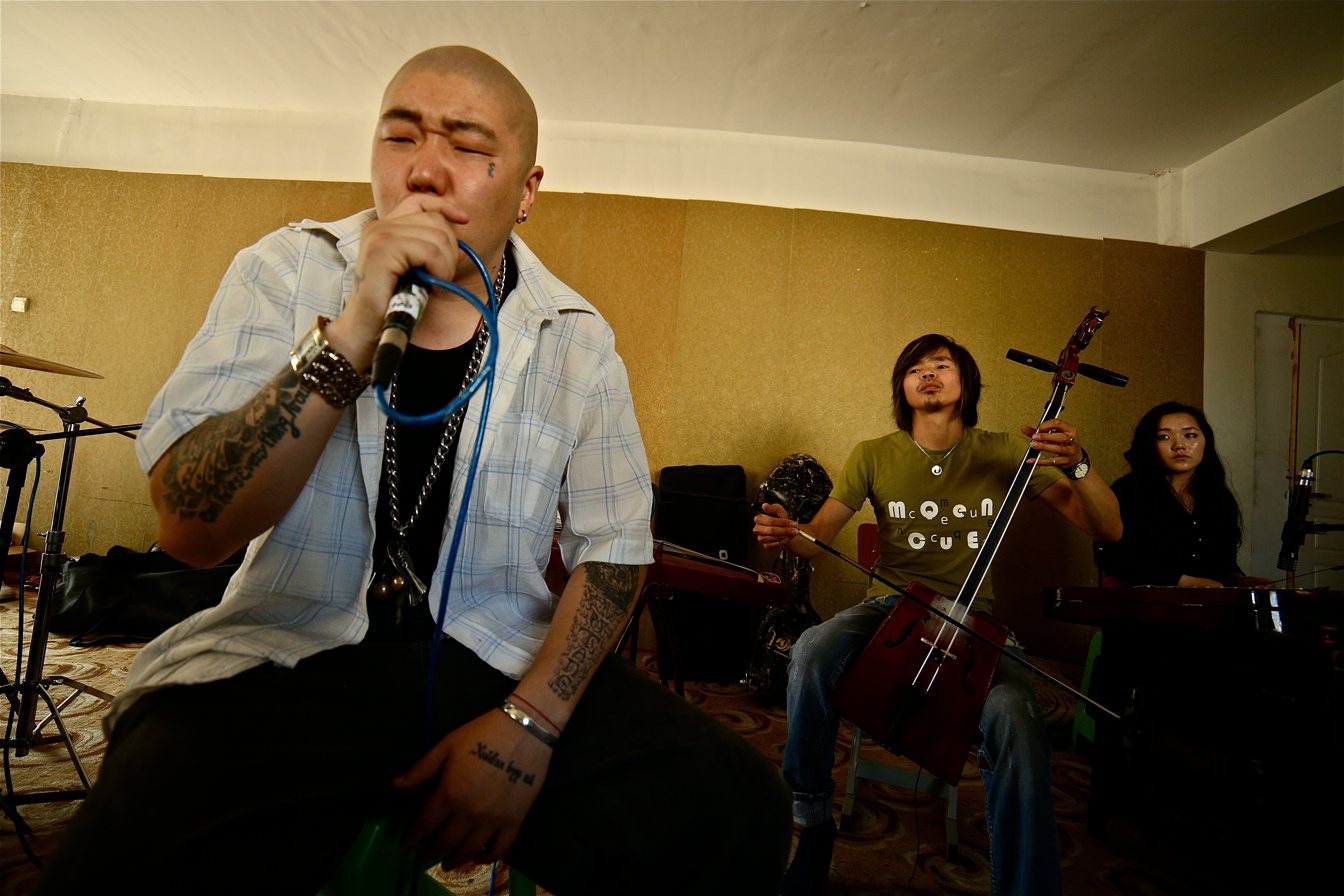
The rapper Big Gee, probably the most recognizable face of Mongolian hip-hop worldwide.

Mongolian rap, or Mongolian hip-hop, is a musical genre that appeared at the end of the 1980s in Mongolia, during a period in which the Mongolian communist regime was weakening and new opportunities for expression were developing. The Khar Sarnai (Black Rose) group, created in 1991, and the Khar Tas (Black Vilture) both entirely at odds with the existing musical standards, played a major role in the development of this style. At the beginning of the 2000s, a new generation of artists offered music with varied influences, but since then this diversity has tended to decrease somewhat with greater attention paid to the American model. Female rappers are rare due to social pressure.

Mongolian rap is a reappropriation of the styles of American hip-hop. It partly uses the same visual codes, such as the symbolic practice of dramatized conflict, loose sports clothing, jewelry, provocative behavior and images, crews, etc. It also incorporates Mongolian cultural references such as Khöömii (throat singing) and Morin khuur, a traditional musical instrument. References to the Mongolian Empire and in particular to the figure of Genghis Khan, a nationalist guardian figure in modern Mongolian society, are frequent. Costumes and references to Mongolian society are evident in song titles and lyrics.

The subjects covered are very diverse, though many productions have romantic love as their subject. Political demands and protest messages are also often addressed. In certain songs, perhaps echoing American rap, women are objectified. Another theme regularly addressed is that of the authenticity of the Mongolian people. It is nationalist in nature, and has its roots in the search, since the fall of the communist regime, for a national identity. It involves the denunciation of mixing between Mongolians and other peoples, the fight against immigration (especially Chinese) and the rejection of foreign investments. A more moderate position promotes the development of the Mongolian people on their own and an end to blaming others.

The Mongolian language is widely used, but other languages, especially English, which is well-integrated into the local linguistic landscape, are also used. English is used as a tool that artists use and manipulate for various purposes, sometimes by means of the invention of anglicized Mongolian terms, to meet the needs of their artistic approaches. The use of coarse language is seen as making it possible to give more reality to texts and to better understand the urgency of certain messages.

With the development of the Internet and other technologies at the end of the 1990s, the spread of Mongolian rap has increased and some artists have had the opportunity to perform abroad.

== Motivations and independence ==
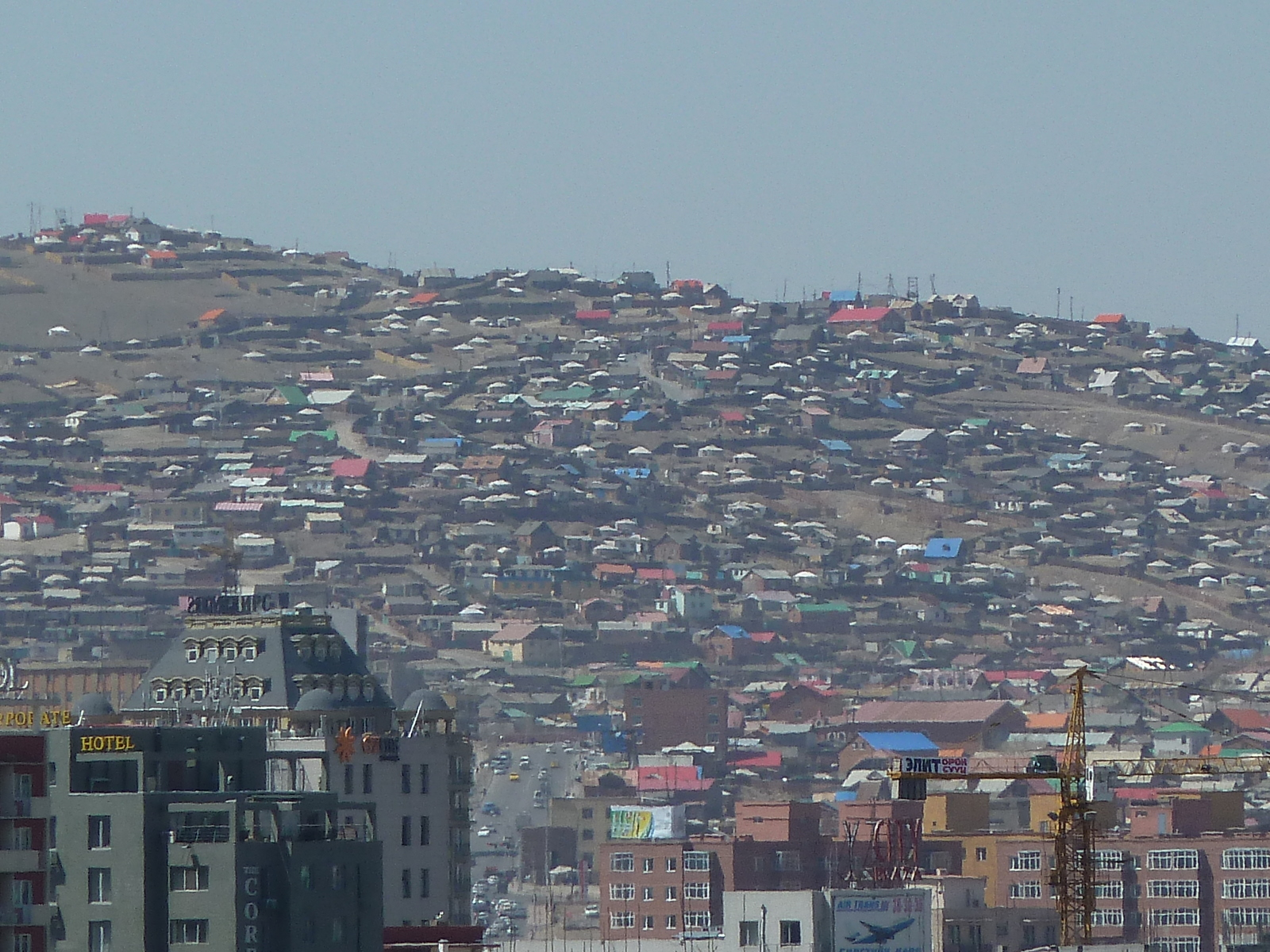
Neighborhood in the suburbs of Ulaanbaatar made up of yurts and permanent houses.

The communist regime for some time sought to ban access to Western popular music, wary of its ideological message. However, from the mid-1960s, it began to penetrate Mongolia from Mongolians returning to the country, spreading covertly among young people, first in the capital Ulaanbaatar. The Mongolian government then chose to support this musical movement by appropriating it and creating tightly controlled pop music groups. In the mid-1980s, these groups began to emancipate themselves, taking advantage of the political decline. (Note: Marsh 2010, pp. 345–347.) Some of their songs were taken up by young demonstrators who, in 1990, in the midst of the collapse of the USSR, obtained the resignation of the communist authorities without violence. (Note: Dovchin 2011, pp. 316–317.) (Note: Marsh 2010, pp. 345–347.) The transition to a democratic nation with a free market economy began. Government control over migration eased considerably and a significant part of the rural population invested in Mongolian cities, notably Ulaanbaatar, profiting from the employment opportunities offered by the new economic system. In 2010, more than two-thirds of Mongolians were urban and almost half the population lived in the capital.

Mongolia is one of the youngest countries in the world with 75% of the population under 35 years old. Unlike rural youth who still live in a traditional way of life, urban youth are largely open to external cultural influences, which have resulted in their multilingualism. If Western pop music was already accessible before 1990, the democratic revolution greatly facilitated access. (Note: Dovchin 2011, pp. 321–322.) Youth quickly took on these influences, moving from consumers of the global popular music scene to producers, experimenting with numerous musical styles, playing with these means of expression while adapting them to local contexts. (Note: Dovchin 2011, p. 321.) Around 1990, some artists produced covers of popular Western songs in Mongolian or English. Others have integrated political and societal messages into their songs, such as the defense of democracy and freedom, or cultural ones such as the life of Genghis Khan. The opening of Mongolia to the West has led to the appearance of musical scenes creating a hybrid between foreign influences and typically Mongolian sounds, themes and styles. Foreign languages, notably English, and Mongolian are used together.

The economic difficulties resulting from the transition from a centralized and planned economy to a market economy, which notably made musical instruments very expensive, led to the disappearance of many groups in the early 1990s. At the end of this decade, the situation of artists previously dependent on Ulaanbaatar – rural communities not having the means to pay the ticket for a concert – improved with the emergence of computers, cable television, urban radios and the Internet. In addition, many companies have begun sponsoring artists, benefiting in return from association with these artists.

== History ==
=== Beginnings ===
External media

Images
- Har Sarnai in costume.

Audio
- Har Sarnai et Amaraa – Duulen niseech on Soundcloud.

Rap, very different from typical Mongolian productions, had great difficulty establishing itself. (Note: Marsh 2010, p. 350.) The first Mongolian rap group was MC Boys, which appeared at the end of the 1980s. It addressed societal, philosophical subjects and rebellion. It was quickly followed, starting in 1991, by the group Khar Sarnai (Black Rose). Formed by two brothers, it offered loud and raw music with house rhythms, which they describe as techno-rap. Anthony J. Fonseca describes their style as a combination of disco and electronic dance music, Gregory Delaplace as a mixture of electronic music, rap and pop. (Note: Delaplace 2014, p. 297.) They sang or even shouted in a guttural and growling voice (throat singing), constantly exchange words, dealing with the dark sides of life and love. They appeared on stage in fantastical costumes, militaristic uniforms, leather boots, face paint, long wigs and top hats, constantly moving with their fists and feet in the air. In the opinion of music historian Peter K. Marsh, they "marked a clear alternative to the refined, well-coiffed and well-behaved ballad singers that had dominated the musical main-stream until then" and "helped to clear a space for a new generation of rappers." Another techno-rap band was the Khar Tas (Black Vilture), commenting on transition-period of Mongolia. Their track Clouded Sky (ca. 1992) is regarded as the first Mongolian hip-hop music video.

=== Development ===
The first wave of Mongolian hip-hop involves such musicians of the second half of the 1990s as Dain ba Enkh, Ice Top, Lumino, MCIT, and 2 Khüü.

Rap began to truly find its audience from the beginning of the 2000s with the advent of a second generation to which the groups and rappers Click Click Boom (CCB), Digital, Epoch, Gangsta Service, Gee (a.k.a. Big Gee), MonTaRap, NC, PacRap, Rokit Bay, Seryoja, Tatar, ThunderZ, Tsetse, Young Mo'G, and others belonged. Some female rappers appeared, such as the artists Gennie, Hulan, Mvchi, Babynna, and NMN (Nomin). Young artists took advantage of rap music and hip-hop culture to translate their hopes, fears and frustrations into forms previously unavailable in mainstream music. Initially confined to the capital where it appeared, Mongolian rap then spread to the rest of the country, reaching rural youth. (Note: Rérat 2006, paragraph 21.)

Between 1996/1997 and 2002, Dain ba Enkh (War and Peace) sang on political and societal subjects to music with Western RnB and disco-funk rhythms. Enkhtaivan, active during the 2000s, was the first solo RnB and rap singer. The groups MonTaRap, Lumino and the rappers Aka Odko and Young Mo'G adopted RnB forms, the group Quiza used G-funk music, the groups Ice Top, CCB, Gangsta Service and the ex-member of the CCB, rapper Big Gee use forms of gangsta rap and hardcore rap, and the artist Rokit Bay has horrorcore tracs. The group Vainquish chose a grand sound elaborated with synthesizers and a Roland TR-808 drum machine. Since the 2010s, XL, Metune and others have employed traditional instruments and throat singing. These two local elements are regularly associated with hip-hop music. (Note: Rérat 2006, paragraph 18.)

In the early 2000s it was not uncommon for Mongolian lyrics to be based on well-known American music: Bi hendch hereggüi (I'm Useless, 2001) by Ice Top used What's the Difference (1999) by Dr. Dre, and Lumino's Hüniih ([She's] Someone Else, 2004), one of the group's big hits, borrows I Know What You Want (2003) from Busta Rhymes and Mariah Carey. While the original lyrics of What's the Difference are about denigration and boasting, the Mongolian version expresses personal inadequacy. In the second case, the original text is an affirmation of erotic art while the Mongolian text is a rejected declaration of love. The influences are not only American. Thus, French rappers sometimes serve as a reference: MonTaRap in Minii Benz (2002) reinterprets Ma Benz (1998) by NTM, and Tatar uses in a song the alternation of a low, sometimes guttural voice, inspired by that of Joey Starr (NTM), and a strong and higher voice comparable to that of Akhenaton (IAM).

External audio
- Ice Top et XL – Hün Chono (Werewolf) on Soundcloud.

The voice is considered a genuine instrument. In the early 2000s, Ice Top pushed it to its limits. Listening is, in the opinion of Grégory Delaplace, "musical experiment that takes language to its animal frontier". (Note: Delaplace 2014, pp. 298–299.)

=== Americanization and traditionalization ===
External videos
- Rokitbay – Neg odriin haan on the Khagan Films YouTube account.

The variety of style seen initially tended to diminish somewhat thereafter. Gregory Deplaplace wrote in 2014 that Mongolian rap became Americanized as it developed and approached Eminem's model. The singer Gee, with his even steady flow and rough but clear voice, is an embodiment of this. This movement does not prevent innovations in the use of language like Neg ödriin haan (King for a day, 2010) by Rokit Bay. (Note: Delaplace 2014, pp. 299–300.)

At the same time, among the new generation of rappers, such as ThunderZ (the Tengri single series) and Young Mo'G (the tracks Naadii and Mongol Swag), one can observe a trend toward fusing American hip-hop with Mongolian traditional musical and performance styles. Finally, Big Gee himself sometimes uses traditional musical instruments such as the morin khuur in his music as well as khöömii (throat singing). Even a Mongolian artist like TulgaT who lives in Los Angeles and sings in American English maintains his own style.

== Visual and cultural aspects ==
Rap is a musical movement in which artists interact with the global forms of the hip-hop movement, mainly influenced by the culture of the African-American community where it was born in the 1970s, and which remains a defining reference, while rooted in the local social, economic, cultural and political context of the country where it is practiced. Mongolian rap is therefore a reappropriation of the styles of American hip-hop into a local context. (Note: Rérat 2006, paragraph 5.)

=== Visual references to American hip-hop ===
Parental Advisory warning label, introduced by the Recording Industry Association of America.

The Mongolian rap scene uses visual references to the American hip-hop movement such as graffiti, which it appears on album (Note: Rérat 2006, paragraphs 6 to 8.) covers or on murals, (Note: Marsh 2010, p. 351.) or the use of the American Parental Advisory: Explicit Lyrics label. Intended to warn of potentially shocking lyrics, it is misused by a number of rappers from America and other regions of the world to demonstrate quality.

Mongolian artists also create characters in the "gangsta" or "bad boy" style, which refer to the symbolic practice of dramatized conflict. They can thus dress in loose sports clothing, often bearing logos of American sports teams, or in tight-fitting leather jackets and pants, and some display jewelry (rings, necklace chains) or piercings and tattoos. Others have baseball caps worn backward or sideways. Rappers also adopt the stage gestures, swearing and obscene motions seen in Western rap videos and use visuals such as counting stacks of banknotes or imitating snorting cocaine in their music videos or on the covers of albums. (Note: Marsh 2010, pp. 350–351.) This is for Mongolian rappers to "align their art with international hip-hop customs while also allowing them to differentiate it from other mainstream Mongolian pop song genres."

These provocations can have had a significant impact. In 2002, the music video for the song Namaig dagaad tsenge (Follow me and have fun) by the group Lumino showed the artists rapping among strippers in a club. The Minister of Justice, deeming it simply, banned its broadcast on television channels allied to the political party in power. The Streisand effect ensured the success of the video and the album and reinforced the group's rebellious image. A new version with "Censored" labels was released as a mockery. (Note: Marsh 2010, pp. 351–352.)

External videos
- Lumino – Namaig dagaad tsenge! on the Lumino YouTube account.

Among American rappers, the concept of collective, of gang or "crew", is borrowed from the language of the ghetto, and designates a kind of family helping each other and sharing a set of dress, body or gesture symbols. It is only partially taken up by Mongolian rap groups, generally failing to have such a defined system of identity marks. (Note: Marsh 2010, p. 352.) Among these crews, one of the most famous is Click Click Boom, which also includes a graffiti artist and a morin khuur player, which thus reinforces its aesthetic distinction. Another, created by Gennie, Yudenten (The Hoodies), travels through rural Mongolia in search of talented young rappers.

=== Influence of Genghis Khan ===
One of the characteristic features of Mongolian hip-hop is frequent references to the Mongol Empire. On a cover of the album Lamba guian Nulims by the group Lumino, the three members of the group, in bad boy posture, are dressed in warrior costumes harkening back to the time of Genghis Khan, the "bad boy of history". according to geographer Patrick Rérat. (Note: Rérat 2006, paragraph 8.) This reference to Genghis Khan is part of a revaluation of Mongolia's past and in particular of its guardian and essential figure, after the fall of the Mongolian communist regime. Previous policy prohibited the evocation of this character, previously venerated, for fear that his deification would awaken Mongol nationalism and inspire desires for autonomy. The upheavals which followed the establishment of a more open political and economic regime were accompanied by the search for a national identity: "In a few years Genghis Khan once again became the symbol of the unity of the nation, of its strength, of its ability to surpass internal divisions and overcome the vicissitudes of history", (Note: Rérat 2006, paragraphs 10 to 14.) "he is the symbol of the time when steppe horsemen ruled half of the known world". (Note: Rérat 2006, paragraph 24.) For example, in 2002, the first stone of a giant memorial was laid in the capital. A second monument was erected in 2006. (Note: Rérat 2006, paragraph 14.) Intellectuals such as the writer Galsan Tschinag criticize this cult, supported by the Mongolian state considering it to be an exaltation of a past intended to make people forget through dreams the difficulties of the country, particularly its impoverishment. (Note: Rérat 2006, paragraph 25.) This is accentuated by climatic problems leading to the death of livestock, which leads to a settling of nomads and therefore anarchic urban growth of the capital.

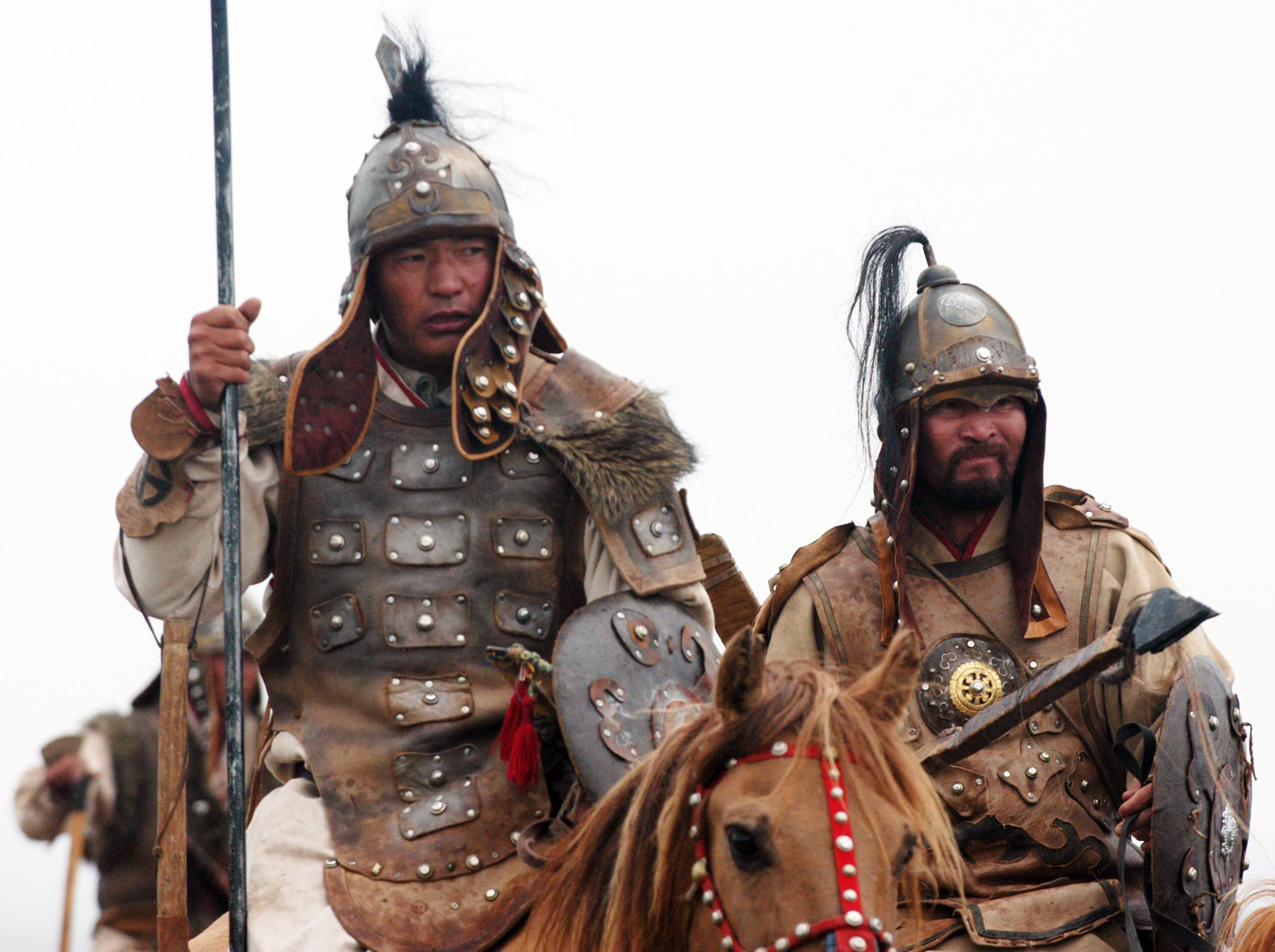
Mongolians in reconstructed military dress from the Mongol Empire.

References to the Mongol Empire are very numerous in Mongolian rap, even if they are not exclusive to this genre of music. In the early 2000s, the group Har Sarnai wore the clothes of Mongolian warriors during its concerts and performed choreographies mixing hip-hop dance and traditional dance. (Note: Rérat 2006, paragraph 15.) In its album covers, the Tatar group, named after a people whom Genghis Khan integrated into his empire and who provided numerous fighters, represents characters from the conquests by drawing inspiration from the technique and aesthetics of graffiti. The traditional writing borrowed from the Uyghurs under Genghis Khan, rejected during the communist period from 1941 in favor of Cyrillic, is also given pride of place on the covers even if it is little used in daily life. (Note: Rérat 2006, paragraph 16.) (Note: Dovchin 2018, p. 192.) During the reign of this emperor, Tibetan Buddhism appeared. Repressed during the Stalinist period, it experienced a renaissance in the early 1990s. The album Lamba guian Nulims (The tears of Mr. Lamba) by Lumino, refers to a Buddhist book very popular in the 1920s, "The tears of a monk ". (Note: Rérat 2006, paragraph 17.)

== Lyrics ==
=== Poetry influence ===
According to Pola Szczap and other scholars, the socialist-period Mongolian dissident poet Ryenchinii Choinom has been recognized as the godfather of Mongolian hip-hop. Especially, the Dain ba Enkh's philosophical lyrics were influenced by his poetic heritage and figure.

=== Variety of subjects ===
Mongolian rappers tackle a wide variety of subjects. The most widespread among all rappers (with the exception of Gee) is romantic love, even if, in the opinion of Grégory Delaplace, the subject is not developed in the most profound and the most varied manner. (Note: Delaplace 2014, p. 300.) In this theme, the pain of love is regularly addressed, mainly from the male point of view, because female artists are rare. This theme is treated in a darker way than in the pop and pop-rock genres. Sexual attraction, casual romance, celebration of youth and partying, declarations of principle, the city of Ulaanbaatar, etc. are other chosen themes.

External audio
- Gee – UU on the Gee Soundcloud account.

In certain songs, Mongolian rap participates, through its references to the great moments of its history, in the nationalist revival of Mongolia. (Note: Rérat 2006, paragraph 23.) It is also a vector of political demands and protest messages, addressing corruption in the political world, the inaction of politicians, foreign investments, insensitivity to the suffering of the poor, unemployment, poverty, alcoholism, (Note: Marsh 2010, pp. 352–353.) or single mothers. These songs can be associated with video clips filmed in the dark and desolate spaces of abandoned or dilapidated buildings. Mongolian rappers feel an obligation to empower and teach younger generations. The incorporation of the rappers' personal experience aims to reflect reality. In the song UU (Drink), Gee addresses the scourge of alcoholism in Mongolia and uses a few expletives to emphasize the urgency of his message.

In other lyrics, male rappers judge women in their work or behavior and tell them what to do, or depict them as "bitches", trophies, or weapons with which to attack their male enemies. It could be that this is just a cover of American hip-hop themes. Unlike men, who are expected by Mongolian society to be independent, aggressive, and loud, female artists face family and societal pressures to make them family-centered and selfless, qualities that go against the nature of the hip-hop lifestyle according to Wallace Quinn Graham. Many women therefore stop after one to two years of rapping.

=== Patriotism ===
External audio
- Tatar – Hun huneeree bai on Soundcloud.

A central concern specific to many Mongolian rap lyrics, but also to many other areas of society, is that of authenticity, or how to be an authentic Mongolian. This question finds its origins in the rise of nationalism which followed the end of the communist regime. "Mongolian identity is more and more linked with the possession of a "pure blood" –something that is denied to children of mixed descent and to ethnic "minorities" in the Western provinces or in Inner Mongolia, who are disqualified as "Mongols" in the full sense of the term." Cultural preservation involves, among other things, the transmission of blood through generations, a nationalist and eugenic idea perfectly illustrated by the song Iluu (Superior, 2009) by Ice Top, where it is sung that the Mongolian man and the Mongolian race is superior. (Note: Delaplace 2014, pp. 300–301.)

However, it is above all the obstacles to the practical application of Mongolian identity in today's world, more than its definition, that interest rappers. Among these obstacles to this achievement are the government, through its corruption and inaction, and Chinese immigration from which it is believed Mongolians will become a minority and the country's resources will be consumed. Ice Top and Dain ba Enh, in their duet 76 – the number of deputies to the State Great Khural — take up these themes. Rapper Gee is particularly intense in his attacks against China and does not hesitate to invoke the figure of Genghis Khan. This hatred of China can go as far as calling for murder, as the group 4 Züg (Four Directions) does. However, such songs are not common. In these denunciations, the rappers believe that they are the voice of the majority against that of illegitimate minorities. A third reason is given for what is preventing Mongolians from realizing their potential as a nation: the Mongols themselves. The Tatar group developed this more moderate position in several songs, notably Hün hüneeree bai (Be your own person) which propelled them to fame at the age of 18. According to this group, Mongolians must take their own responsibilities by no longer looking for fault elsewhere, by not trying to take advantage of others and by ceasing to cling to crazy dreams and beliefs. (Note: Delaplace 2014, pp. 301–302.)

=== Languages ===
The harshness of the Mongolian language makes Mongolian rap difficult to hear and understand, according to rapper Tsetse. On the contrary, rapper Gennie considers it suitable even if the music is inevitably harsh. Due to the lack of words that rhyme together in the Mongolian language, most rappers do not attempt to make their verses rhyme. Critics of Mongolian rap deplore the use of crude vocabulary, but these words are considered useful for expression by the artists, even if their use should be downplayed according to some. They "are reflective of hip-hop

culture's values of truthfulness, freedom, and independence" according to Tsetse.

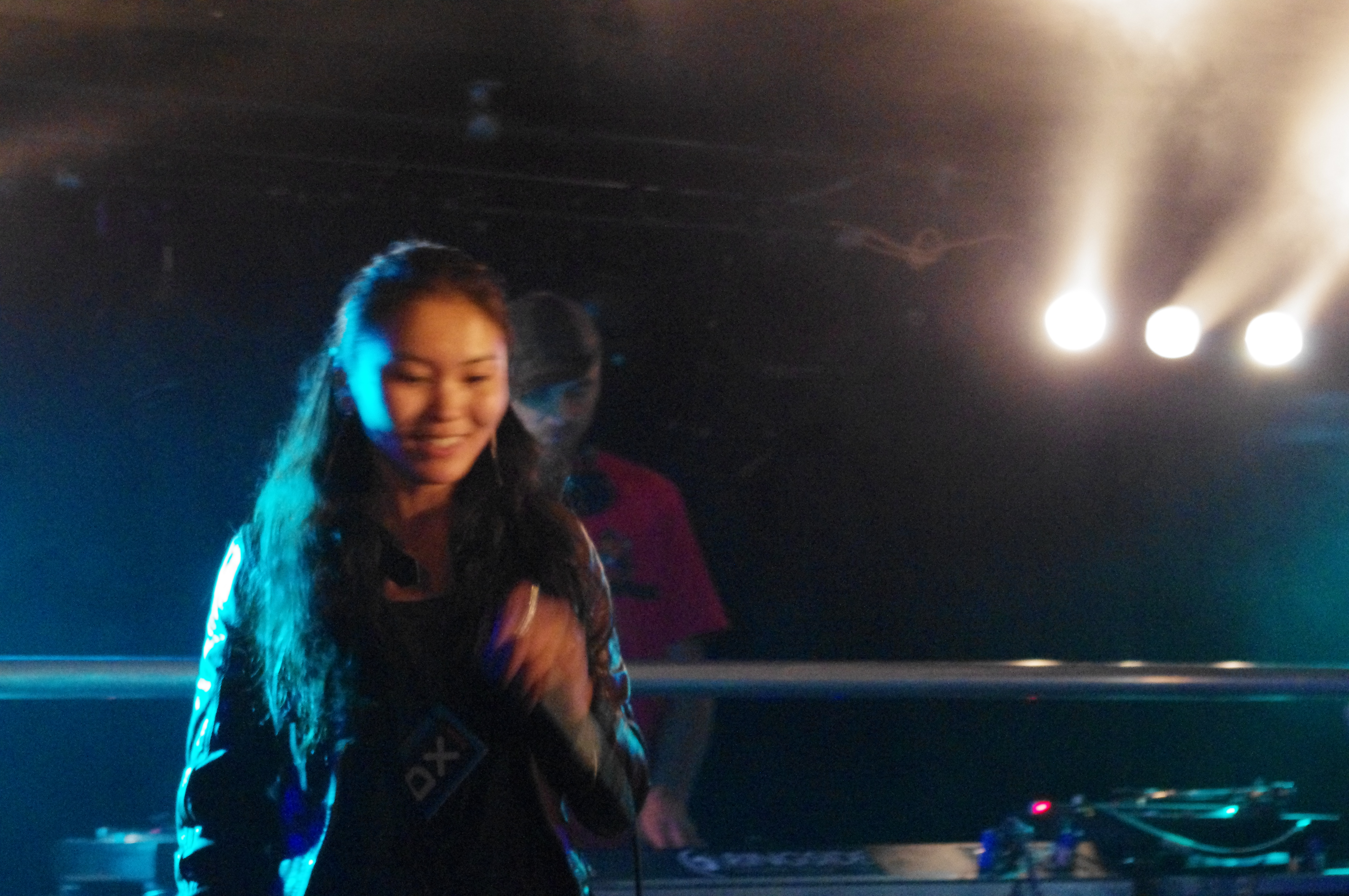
The rapper Gennie.

For many rappers, French, Japanese, Spanish, Korean and Russian but especially English are used to name groups and artists (for example, in English: Range, Ice Top, Gee, Click Click Bloom, BBChain, Oppozit; in Spanish: Quiza), song titles and sometimes for writing lyrics. The lyrics of the songs are, while generally in Mongolian, in some cases are entirely in English. In Mongolia, English has been integrated into the local linguistic landscape since the end of the communist regime and holds an important place in daily life. If the use of English in a song is well accepted when it comes to a pure language, standard English, it is not always so when it comes to African-American Vernacular English and can it can lead to criticism when this dialect is integrated into a Mongolian song. The rapper Gennie experiences this in her song with a nationalist theme, but with the English title Don't Cry. It has been accused of trying to imitate American rap. She defended herself by explaining that she is not manipulated by English, but that it is she who manipulates it. The use of English in Mongolian rap is a part of several strategies. It is a way to identify with a transnational musical scene (British English, African-American vernacular English, etc.) or to differentiate oneself from other English-speaking musicians. It is also a symbolic resource for revealing a "foreign voice" or an imaginary foreign subject; it is a space of freedom allowing the expression of taboo and disturbing aspects of Mongolian culture. Finally, it is used for the invention of anglicized Mongolian terms, incomprehensible to English speakers, and which require knowledge of the local culture to be understood.

== Authenticity ==
Mongolian rap arouses criticism from older generations of musicians, who see it only as a copy of American models and the result of brainwashing by American hip-hop, (Note: Dovchin 2018, p. 194.) but also from defenders of traditional culture: Mongolian rap artists are accused of distorting Mongolian language and culture. (Note: Dovchin 2018, p. 194.) Critics also point out that cultural backgrounds are different. There is a mix of the population in the different districts of Ulaanbaatar. Ghettos linked to racial, ethnic or socio-economic class are absent. In addition, Mongolian rappers generally come from the middle class, are mostly educated, and have never had difficult living conditions, which, according to these artists, is due to the fact that the poor do not have the ways to launch an artistic career. (Note: Marsh 2010, pp. 353–355.) Artists who have had a difficult career like Gee, who grew up in a Ger Khoroolol, a neighborhood of yurts, are particularly admired by their colleagues. Other rappers are considered commercial and called fake by other lesser known artists who consider that they degrade the quality of the music and make it less credible.

In response to criticism of the authenticity of Mongolian rap, Peter K. Marsh points out that rappers believe that rap is both authentic and real in Mongolia, that they do not seek to strictly copy American rap but to develop a space for artistic expression to defend problems that seem important to them and which are not addressed by others. (Note: Marsh 2010, pp. 354–355.) For many artists, rap is perfectly suited to the realistic expression of social criticism; while, in the opinion of rapper Batorgil from the group Ice Top, Mongolian pop-rock which only sings about love. (Note: Marsh 2010, p. 353.) The public following Mongolian rap expects serious lyrics as is often the case in American rap. For Sender Dovchin, Mongolian rap is a transmodal art, a recombination of linguistic resources (Mongolian, English, French, etc.), traditional elements (throat singing, Mongolian musical instruments), nationalist symbols, cultural heritage, transgressions, behavioral attitudes, which make Mongolian hip-hop a way of life in its own right.

== Spread ==
Technological means such as the Internet, in particular social media sites such as YouTube and Facebook, have improved the visibility and quality of productions, facilitated contacts between fans and artists or between artists, while making competition between artists more equitable, the support of a producer or a music label no longer being obligatory. These media also offer greater artistic freedom, with commercial logic no longer constraining production.

Mongolian rap is heavily marketed in Mongolia and many rappers sell at least some of their songs, if only to survive economically. A few rare exceptions like the rapper Gennie refuse this commercialization. (Note: She wishes for people to find her music, through friends or by discovering it online. In occupying the gap between the industry and music, she also believes that she is better able to stay in touch with reality and learns through her many collaborative projects with other musicians.)

The diffusion of Mongolian rap goes beyond national borders. It is thus integrated into the network of the Asian musical world and groups like Lumino and Tatar have given concerts in China, Japan and South Korea and even, for the group Lumino, in the United States with the Mongolian diaspora. (Note: Rérat 2006, paragraph 20.) Rapper Gennie was invited to the United States by a rock guitarist to collaborate and record music. She also participated, in France, in the Mongolian-French hip-hop festival Hos Ayas. This event features prominently in the documentary Mongolian Bling (Ghazarian & Binks, 2012), the subject of which is Mongolian rap.

== Notes and references ==
=== Articles ===
- Delaplace, Gregory (2014). "The ethics and esthetics of Mongolian hip-hop". gendai Mongoru o shiru tame no 50 shô [Understanding Mongolia in 50 Chapters] (in Japanese). pp. 269–302.
- Dovchin, Sender (2011). "Performing Identity Through Language: The Local Practices of Urban Youth Populations in Post-Socialist Mongolia". Inner Asia. 13 (2): 315–333. doi:10.1163/000000011799297618. ISSN 1464-8172..
- Dovchin, Sender (2016). "Translocal English in the linguascape of Mongolian popular music". World Englishes. 1: 1–19..
- Dovchin, Sender (2018). "Dissatisfaction and Dissent in the Transmodal Performances of Hip-hop Artists in Mongolia". The sociolinguistics of hip-hop as critical conscience : dissatisfaction and dissent. Palgrave Macmillan. pp. 191–211. doi:10.1007/978-3-319-59244-2_8. ISBN 978-3-319-59244-2.
- Druzin, Heath (27 January 2020). "There's Nothing Quite Like Mongolian Hip-Hop". ozy.com..
- Fonseca, Anthony J. (2019). Hip Hop around the World: An Encyclopedia. ABC-CLIO. pp. 482–483. ISBN 978-0-313-35759-6.
- Lim, Louisa (10 September 2009). "A New Beat Gives Young Mongolia A Voice, Identity". npr.org..
- Marsh, Peter K. (2010). "Our generation is opening its eyes: hip-hop and youth identity in contemporary Mongolia". Central Asian Survey. 29 (3): 345–358. doi:10.1080/02634937.2010.518013..
- Quinn Graham, Wallace (1 October 2015). "B-Boy and Buuz: A Study of Mongolian Hip-Hop Culture". Independent Study Project (ISP) Collection..
- Rérat, Patrick (1 December 2006). "Le rap des steppes. L'articulation entre logiques globales et particularités locales dans le hip-hop mongol". Géographie et cultures (in French) (59): 43–55. doi:10.4000/gc.3751. ISSN 1165-0354..
- Szczap, Pola (October 2024). "Surgaal and the lineage of Mongolian didactic hip hop". Global Hip Hop Studies. 5 (1–2): 87–110. doi:10.1386/ghhs_00084_1.

=== Other resources ===
- Mongolian Bling, Benj Binks, 2012, Video on Vimeo
- Szczap, Pola (4 March 2021). "Place names in Mongolian hip-hop".
