= Gereg =

Gereg may refer to:

- Gereg (Egschiglen album), 2007 album by Mongolian band Egschiglen
- The Gereg, 2019 album by Mongolian band the Hu
