= Baldan =

Baldan is both an Italian (mainly Veneto) and Mongolian surname and a given name. Notable people with the name include:

- Baldan Tsyzhipov (born 1990), Russian freestyle wrestler
- Albino Baldan (1925–1991), Italian rower
- Dario Baldan Bembo (born 1948), Italian composer
- Ferry Mursyidan Baldan (1961–2022), Indonesian politician
- Marco Baldan (born 1993), Italian footballer
- Nicola Baldan (born 1982), Italian racing driver
- Sodnom Baldan (1908–1979), Mongolian professor

== See also ==
- Baldan Bereeven Monastery, a Buddhist monastery in Mongolia
