= Gennie =

Mongolian rapper (born 1987)

Gennie Bolor
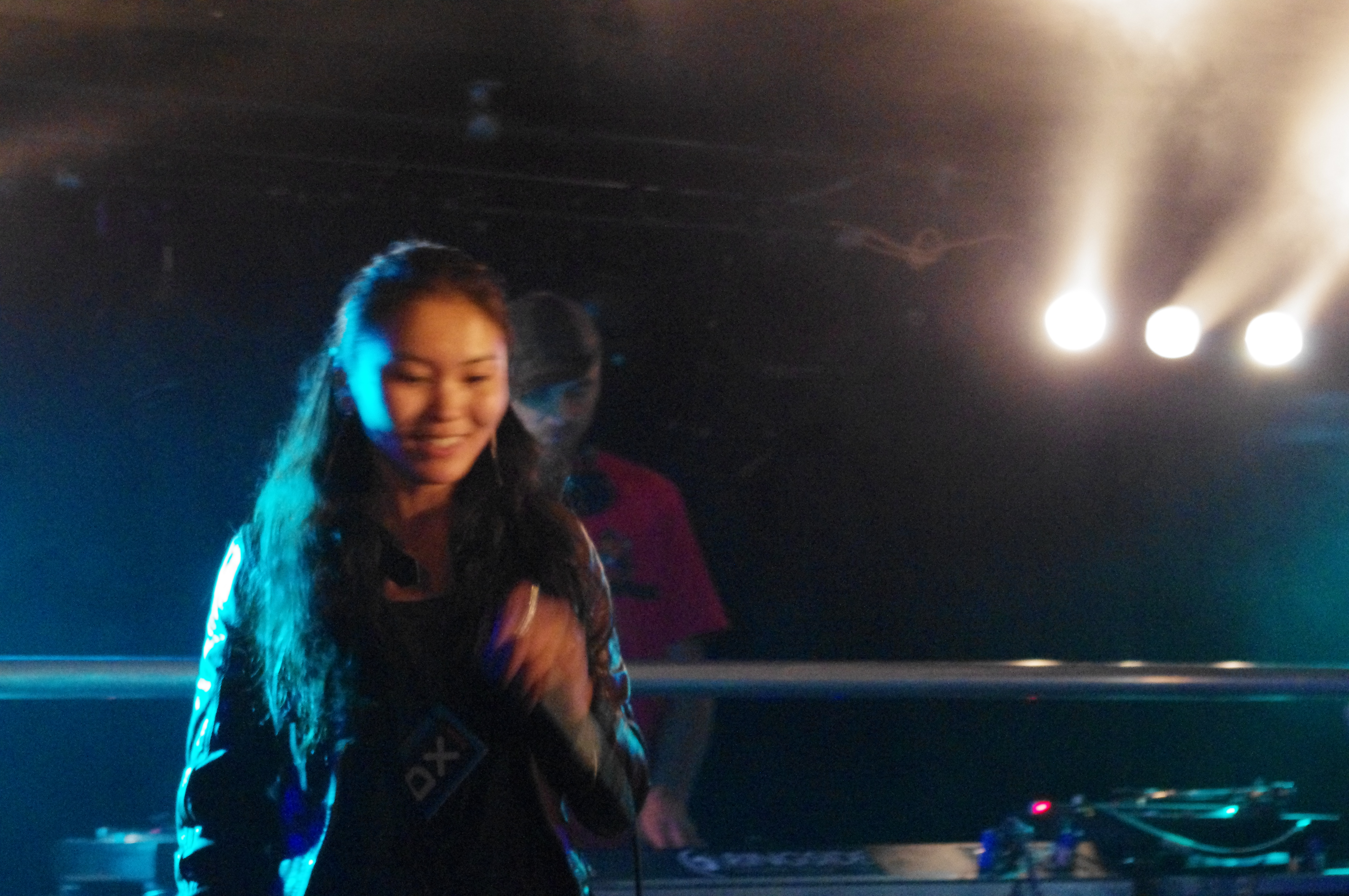
- Born: 1987 (age 38–39); Mongolia
- Citizenship: Mongolia
- Occupations: Rapper; Lyricist; Mechanic
- Years active: 2000s–present
- Known for: One of the first female rappers in Mongolia; called the "Queen of Mongolian hip-hop"
- Notable work: "Women", Mongol Suubilig (2012)
- Children: 2 sons

Gennie Bolor (born 1987) is a Mongolian rapper. Having started listening to American rap music as a child, she started writing lyrics as a teenager. In the early 2000s, she met Mongolian rapper Enkhtaivan, who became her manager and gave her the stage name Gennie; he remained involved in her career until his death in 2012. Gennie has been described as one of the first female rappers in Mongolian history, as well as one of the most prominent currently active rappers in the country. Gennie's lyrics often include references to politics, social issues, the environment and women. She has been described as the "Queen of Mongolian hip-hop".

== Biography ==
Gennie was born in 1987 to Mongolian parents. As a child, she listened to American rap artists including the Wu-Tang Clan, Tupac Shakur and Onyx on her cousin's Walkman. She learned English by translating Eminem lyrics into Mongolian. When she was a teenager, Gennie began writing lyrics, and first performed on stage during high school. In 2000, she was a participant of a television talent show that aimed to create an all-female rap group. Shortly afterwards, Gennie met rapper Enkhtaivan, the founder of the rap group Dain Ba Enkh, who became her producer until his death in 2012. Enkhtaivan gave Gennie her stage name, which was derived from the English word "genius".

Gennie has been described as one of the first female artists in Mongolia, alongside Hulan, and one of the only to have more than one or two songs. Gennie has a son, born in 2009, and another son born subsequently; due to difficulties in getting a steady income from music, Gennie also works as a mechanic, becoming one of the first women in the country to work as a water pressure mechanic.

Gennie has reported deliberately staying away from the music industry and releasing her music independently. She has relatively few solo songs, with the majority of her music being collaborations with other artists, including fellow rappers as well as pop and jazz artists. In 2010, Gennie headlined the French music festival Hos Ayas, which featured prominently in the 2012 documentary film Mongolian Bling. She has continued to perform in France, including at the Paris Hip Hop Festival in 2015. Gennie created the rap group Yudenten (lit. 'The Hoodies'), which travels around rural areas of Mongolia in search of talented young rappers.

Her first album, Mongol Suubilig, was released in 2012 in France.

Gennie's lyrics have included themes such as the environment and the treatment of marginalised groups in Mongolian society. This has included the song "Women", which tells the story of a middle-aged woman in an abusive relationship, a teenager being exploited by older men and a victim of human trafficking. She has spoken out about women being "neglected" by the government, including single mothers, as well as the environment being damaged by mining, and alcoholism and domestic abuse. Gennie performs primarily in Mongolian, but uses words from African American Vernacular English, such as in the song "Don't Cry".

In 2014, Gennie travelled to the United States to record with American guitarist Burnzi Innes.
