= Lumino (band) =

Hip-hop group based in Mongolia

Lumino / Люмино
- Origin: Mongolia
- Genres: Hip hop
- Years active: 1998 – present
- Members: D. Temuujin (Mcbeatz a.k.a MC); D. Ankhbaatar (Skitzo) B. Bat-Khishig (Baji) T. Zolbayar (Dj Zolo)
- Past members: Jason; Ice; Hülgüü (X.L.); Chinzorig (Chinzo); Quiza; Lizard

Lumino (Mongolian: Люмино) is a hip-hop group from Mongolia founded in 1996. Their music is dance-friendly and often melodic, with frequent contributions by external vocalists. Like most Mongolian bands, they like to include elements of traditional Mongolian music in their songs.

The creation of the band was inspired by a person named Jason who worked as an English teacher in Mongolia in 1996 and 1997. Besides giving language lessons, he also introduced his students to hip-Hop music. Five of them then came together to form Lumino, but a few years after the formation of the band two of their members, Chinzo and Hülgüü, stopped performing with the band. At one point Lumino consisted of more than a dozen members, headed by Skitzo, including the main MCs Skitzo, MC, Chinzo, and Lizard and MCs from the groups Old School and Skitzo's Free Style.

Around 1999 the group went through a major restructuring and changed their strategy in terms of songs they were producing. They also cut their members to five. Previously known for their hardcore rap, Lumino also started to make softer songs for mainstream audiences, and the head of the band was replaced by MC. A number of songs such as Zam and Hüniih were made into video clips and repeatedly played on TV, while the video for Namaig dagaad tseng was censored because of its too explicit imagery.

== Discography ==
- Энд гарч ирэв (End garch irev, 2001)
- Ирээд буцсан хайр минь (Ireed butssan khair mini, 2002)
- Гэрэлт хорвоод (Gerelt khorvood, 2003)
- Ламба гуайн нулимс (Lamba guain nulims, 2005)
- Хуучин сургууль (Khuuchin surguuli "Old school", 2006)
- Platinum beatz (Mcbeatz/Mc, 2011)
- Romantic beatz (Mcbeatz/Mc, 2011)
- Хэмнэл нэрэгч (Hemnel neregch,2023)

== Members ==
- D. Temujin (MC) (The General of Mongolian HipHop)
- B. Bat-Khishig (Baji)
- D. Ankhbaatar (Skitzo) (a.k.a. CUTHBERTH)
- T. Zolbayar (Dj Zolo)

..

== Video ==
- 2000 “Бүтэлгүй хайр” Zaya’sh
- 2000 “Баярлалаа,Ухаарлаа” Zaya’sh
- 2001 “Энд гарч ирэв” Оны шилдэг клип Zaya’sh
- 2002 “Зам” Zaya’sh
- 2003 “Ирээд буцсан хайр минь” Zaya’sh
- 2003 “Хэдэн үгс” Lemon production
- 2003 “Наддаа ирээч” Zaya’sh
- 2003 “Намайг дагаад цэнгэ!” Lemon production
- 2003 “Гэрэлт хорвоод” Zaya’sh
- 2004 “Эхнэртээ бичсэн захидал” Zaya’sh
- 2004 “Хүнийх” Zaya’sh
- 2004 “Хип хоп рыцаръ” Lemon production
- 2004 “2 дахь хайр” Hero entertainment
- 2004 “Хүслийн шөнө” Lu entertainment
- 2005 “Freestyle” Lemon production
- 2005 “Кармааны хулгайч” Hero entertainment
- 2005 “Хайртай гэдгээ хэлээч” Cross studio
- 2006 “Өвөл” G entertainment
- 2006 “Тайван” Skin entertainment
- 2006 “Надтай цуг баяс” Lu entertainment
- 2006 “Уучил намайг” Zaya’sh
- 2007 “7 эгшиг” Lu entertainment
- 2007 “Бүжээрэй!” Lu entertainment
- 2007 “Минийх” Lu entertainment
- 2010 “Талархалын өдөр” TJ entertainment
- 2013 "Сэнбий" GREEN creative art
- 2014 "Тултал хий" TJ Entertainment
- 2014 "Заримдаа" Green Creative Art
- 2015 "Шөнө дунд цас орж байна" TJ entertainment
- 2016 "Хэмнэл Нэрэгч" TJ entertainment
- 2017 "Хөдөө гаръя" Lanz film production
- 2018 "Хамаарал" TJ Entertainment
- 2018 "Биелгээ хийхийг заагаач хө" Marshall Inc. production
- 2019 "Narnii daraa" Dual Zet
- 2019 "Ganjeenjoo" On&Off production
- 2020 "Парист 2-уулаа болзоно" Grove entertainment
- 2021 "Парист 2-уулаа болзоно" (DJ ZOLO RMX) animation loop
- 2023 "Чи Хаана байна" Grove entertainment
- 2024 “Block хийсэн дээр” Bronze hero entertainment
- 2024 “Усны шувууд” Grove entertainment

== Sources ==
- "Люмино" (in Mongolian). www.duu.mn, Mongolian music portal. Archived from the original on 2008-12-04.
