= Soyol Erdene =

Mongolian rock band

- Origin: Ulaanbaatar, Mongolia
- Genres: Rock, Pop, Glam rock, New Wave, Post-Punk
- Years active: 1971-1989, 2015-2021-present
- Label: Melodiya/Mongol Ayalguu
- Past members: Tserenbat; Erdenekhuyag; Batsaikhan; Naranbaatar; Galsanbat; Zundari; Bayar; Damdinsuren; Jargalsaikhan.D; D. Enkhbold; Kh. Bulgan; B. Tsolmon; Rentsenkhand; Nandintsetseg; Dulamsuren; Uranchimeg; Nasantogtokh; Ariunaa

Soyol Erdene (Mongolian: Соёл Эрдэнэ, [ˈsɔjɔɮ ˈɛrdən]) was the first rock band of Mongolia.

== Name ==
"Soyol Erdene" is the name of a melodious popular song of 1920s which the band played on an electric guitar. The approximate meaning is "Cultural jewel"or “Cultural treasure”

== History ==
The band was established in late 1971. The Minister of Culture of that time, famous novelist Ch. Lodoidamba called four young musicians and said: "England has a band The Beatles of four young men. Why shouldn't we have a similar band?" The four young musicians, who had recently graduated from the School of Music and Dance in Ulaanbaatar (nowadays College of Music and Dance) as yatga (ятга) players, established a rock band. The members were Tserenbat (drums), Erdenekhuyag (guitar), Batsaikhan (guitar) and Naranbaatar (keyboard). Later members were Galsanbat (guitar-solo), Zundari (bass), Bayar (vocal), Damdinsuren (guitar), Jargalsaikhan (drums), Jargalsaikhan (guitar/vocal), B. Tsolmon (drums). Among the more recent members were D. Enkhbold (guitar-solo) and Kh. Bulgan (keyboard). Soyol Erdene also performed for female singers Rentsenkhand, Nandintsetseg, Dulamsuren, Uranchimeg, Nasantogtokh, and Ariunaa.

During socialism, the band worked under the administration of the State Philharmony which also supervised a symphony orchestra and the jazz band Bayan Mongol.

The first compositions of the band were Mongolian folk songs in a rock style arrangement as well as songs written by the members of the band. They often used poems of famous Mongolian writers.

The rock band was frequently criticized by the Mongolian People's Party for promotion of the Western musical style and Western fashion.

Soyol Erdene won the gold medal at the 10th World Festival of Youth and Students in 1973.

Soyol Erdene's only full album, Soyol Erdene, was re-released in 2019 by the Everland Music Group.

== Repertoire ==
Among the most popular songs created by the members of Soyol Erdene during its merseybeat period in the early 1970s were "Setgeliin jigüür" (The wings of the Mood), "Zürhnii aizam" (Melody of the Heart), and "Uchraliin uyanga" (Melody of Love) by Zundari, Ankhnii khairiin duu (Song of the First Love) and Hüleelt (Waiting) by Jargalsaikhan.G, 6:45, Tursun udriin duu (Happy Birthday's song), 18 nas mini namaig buu orkhioch (Don’t leave me, my childhood), Burged (The Eagle), Chinggis khaan by Jargalsaikhan.D,

The most popular rock interpretations of Mongolian folk songs were "Damdin" and "Tonjoo" (Western Mongolian folk song). Western Mongolian folklore fitted well with the rock arrangement.

The most renowned instrumental compositions of Soyol Erdene were "Soyol Erdene", "Sansriin khölög" (Spaceship, composed by Baatarsukh. S, 1969), Tsenkher zalaa (a yatga solo that became a jingle for weather forecasts composed by Baatarsukh. S, 1969) and "Ankhnii tsas" (The First Snow) by Naranbaatar, rock composition "Bid" (We are) by Jargalsaikhan. D.

== See also ==
- Music of Mongolia
