= Sodnom Baldan =

Mongolian literature scholar (1908–1979)

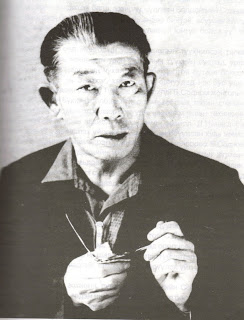
Baldan Sodnom 1908-1979

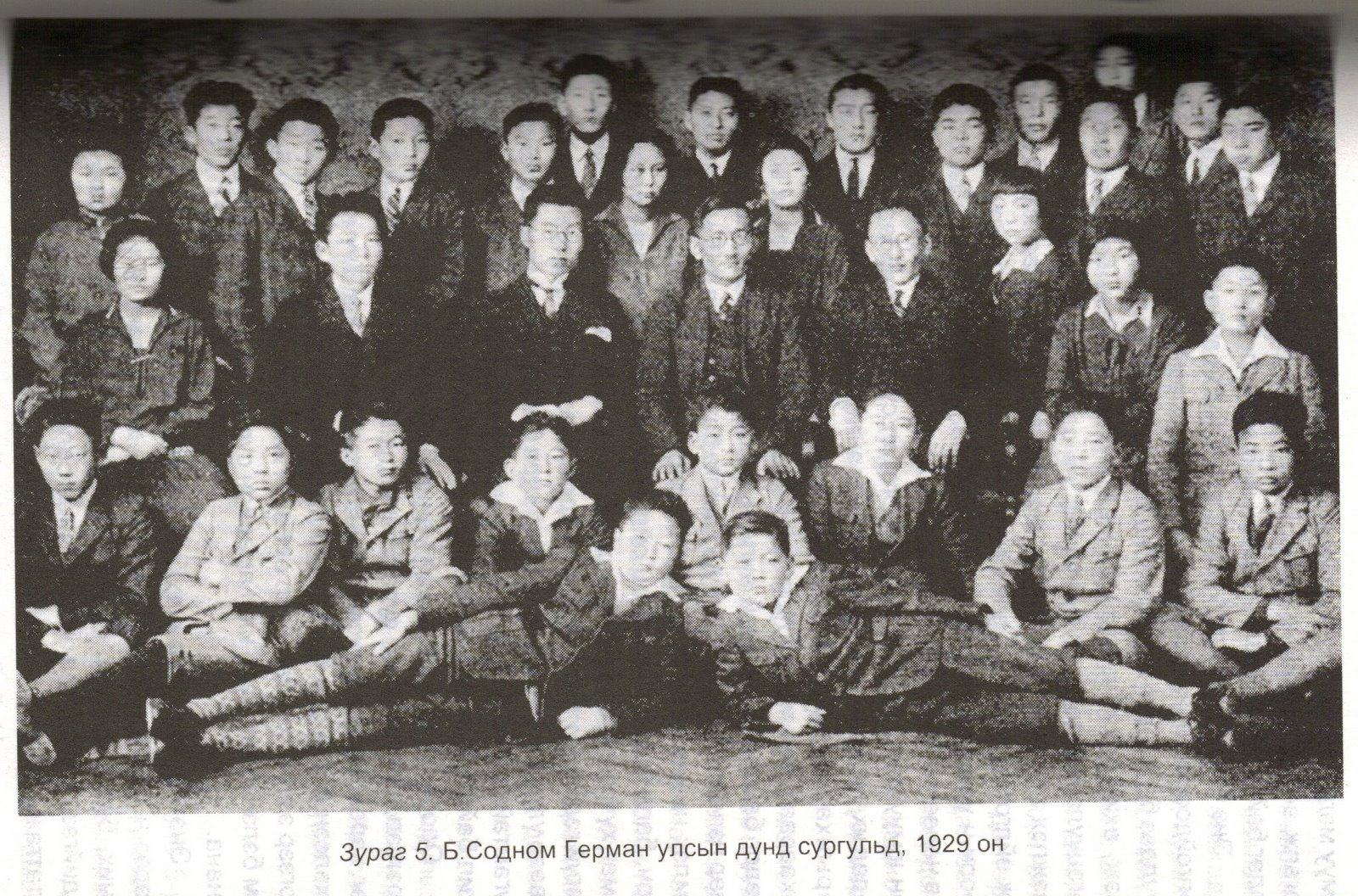
B. Sodnom German ulsyn dund surgul'd, 1929 on ; Анхны барууны оюутан 1926-1930

Sodnom Baldan (January 4, 1908 – 1979) was one of the first Mongolian students to study in Western Europe, one of the first members of the Mongolian Writers' Union, a professor at the Mongolian National University, author of Mongolian literature, founder of the study of D. Natsagdorj, philologist, Director of Mongolian National Dictionary Chamber, and senior Mongolian Academy science scholar.

== Early life ==
B. Sodnom was born April 1, 1908, near Lake Gun Galuutay in the state of Tusheet Khan, county of Darkhan Chin Van, village of Nuurentey (now it is called Bayandelger Soum of Töv Aimag) to a poor family. Baldan was their only son and he had two sisters. Until he was 15 years old, he and his family were hired help for master herder Gonchig. When he was 15 years old Baldan moved with his family to Amgalanbaatar (which is near Ulaanbaatar) to go to school.

== Education ==
- Elementary, Middle, High School 1923–1925
- First Pioneer(Scout) 1925
- Staatliche Lehranstalt School in Lichterfelde, Germany 1926
- Obirayal School and University in Potsdam near Berlin, Germany 1926–1930
- Study of Eastern Europe, European University at Saint Petersburg 1931

== Academic career ==
- Script and literature Institute (now Language and literature of Institute Mongolia) – 1931
- Chamber of Language literature Institute's Director – 1937
- Professor of Teachers' College – 1938
- Senior Philologist Language and Literature Institute, Mongolian Academy of Science – 1939
- Director of Language Literature Institute in the Mongolian Academy of Science – 1941–1947
- Professor of Mongolian National University – 1949–1951
- Director of Mongolian National Dictionary Chamber – 1950–1979

== Family ==
He married Norjmaa Baldan in 1952 and they had 11 children. He met her in 1950, she was related to Batmonk Dayan Khan, her great-grandfather was one of the state of Tusheet Khan's nobility – Sandag Taij, who had a Silk Road trading business that had been handed down through the generations.

Sodnom was a biological father of the pop singer Tumur Khurlat.

== Political victimization ==
All of the Mongolian students that had studied abroad in Western Europe were jailed from 1938 until 1940 by orders of the Mongolian Government officials, who were influenced by Soviet officials. Baldan Sodnom was one of them. They were imprisoned yet again from 1947 until 1949 when most of them were again subjected to prison including Baldan Sodnom again based on influence from Soviet officials. They pardoned them in 1951 for their 1938–1940 prison time and expunged their records. In 1969 they pardoned them for the 1947–1949 prison time. Yet until he died, the Communists kept checking up on him. The records of this are stored and on display at the Memorial Museum for Victims of Political Repression.

== Articles and poetry ==
- First Drama written in the Mongolian language in Middle School and played at city of Amgalanbaatar club by "Yaduu huu – The poor boy", "Teneg taij – The Moran Baron" By B. Sodnom - 1924
- "Plan of Mongolian language updates* By B. Sodnom - 1930,
- "Utga zohiolin tuhai - About literature" By Sodnom 1934
- "Hun torolton herhen bolovsorson tuhai – About human revolution" by Fedoseev, edited by B. Sodnom, Moscow and Leningrad – 1934
- "Ev hamtiin yos ba niigem juramiin yos yu boloi – What is rule in the community and rule in the society" Russian translated by Dambadorj, edited by B. Sodnom, Moscow and Leningrad – 1934
- "Hoyor delhii – Two world" translated by Dambadorj, edited by B.Sodnom, Moscow and Leningrad - 1934
- "Urgejilsen zohioliin tuhay – Key of prose literature by B. Sodnom 1938
- "Speech of D. Natsagdorj's literature in the first International study of Mongol" by B. Sodnom – 1959
- "Genghis Khan's Twin Stallion" translated by B. Sodnom in Russian language – 1935

"Genghis Khan's Twin Stallion" old scripts transected to Cyrillic and poetry style by Ts. Damdinsuren, edited by B. Sodnom - 1956

- "Researched literature of D. Natsagdorj", edited by Ts. Damdinsuren 1961
- "Catalog of work about Mongolian human names" and 80.000 names By B. Sodnom 1964
- "Russian and Mongolian dictionary" By B. Sodnom - 1964
- "Russian poetry event with young poetry's B. Tsedendamba "1966
- "Mongoliin zogiolxdiin V ih huraliin iltgel - Speech of Mongolian authors V conference" 1973

Founder of academy: 1. Study of Mongol 2. Study of Mongolian Literature and Culture 3. Study of Mongolian Epic and Oral literature 4. Study of D. Natsagdorj 5. Study of Mongolian Dictionary 6. Study of Mongolian Modern Literature

== Publications ==
=== Newspapers and magazines ===
First poem "Zaluuchuud – Youths" published in "Direction of National culture" Journal – 1933, "Aeroflot" – 1935

- "Bichig useg haana herhen boloi – About origins of the alphabet and writing" By B. Sodnom 1935 *
- Poem by B. Sodnom "Tungalag narni huch – Power of the Sun", "Bohiin tsoliin tuhai – About Wrestler's Awards" published in journal "Mongolian National Culture of Direction" - 1935
- "Gegeen huulia sahay – Obey the Law and Follow the Rules" – 1937
- "Uran saihan – entertainment" published in magazine "New Mirror" by B. Sodnom - 1938
- "Tseg tsegleliin uchir – About Dot and Point" published in magazine "New mirror" By B. Sodnom 1938
- "Jangariin tuhai – About Jangar epic story by B.Sodnom in magazine "Science" – 1944
- "Zohioliin yavdal hemegch yun bui – What is the story of literature" By B. Sodnom in magazine "Ember" – 1944
- "Uran zohiol gej yug heldeg ba tuuniig unshij ashiglah – What is literature and how it is used and read" in magazine "Union of Youth" By B.Sodnom 1944
- Children's song music by S. Gonchigsumlay Poetry by B. Sodnom "Onchin ishig – Orphan Baby Goat"- 1944
- "When was script and writing started", "Adults learn letters", "About Mongolian literatures" – 1934
- "About Mongolian literature", About Mongolian epic and oral literature" – 1935
- "Mongolian wise words", "Mongolian short story" with 20 tales and stories, and "Herders Culture of Mongolia" – 1935
- "About non function literature", "About Grammar and words" "Work about Language Institute", "Story about literature"- 1944,"Member of market" – 1945, "Key of Mongolian poetry" and he wrote over 100 articles and speeches.
- His historical famous article in the international "Mongoliin utga zohioliin tuuhchilsen tolov – History of Mongolian literature – 1946
- "Pioneer bagachuud – Pioneer and children", "Zahidal – Letter", – 1959
- "Emeeltei tarvaga – With saddle marmot", "Batgana yavbal öttöy – Flies laying egg turning into worm larvae in magazine "Crocodile" By B. Sodnom 1950
- "Mongoliin ertii uran zohiold Chingisiin diriig uzuulsen ni – About Genghis Khan's characters in Early Mongolian literature" in magazine "Culture and literature" By B. Sodnom 1962
- Urgamaliin ner tomiyo – Dictionary of Plants" M. Manibazar, edited by B. Sodnom 1962
- "Mongol hurim – The Mongolian wedding" in magazine "Science and life" by B. Sodnom 1965

=== Books ===
- "Mongoliin aman zohiol, setsen ugs – Mongolian oral literature and wise words" collected 773 wise words by B. Sodnom 1935
- "Mongol ardiin zuir ug – Mongolian National Proverbs" 693 proverbs by with L. Mishig and B. Sodnom – 1956
- "Mongol onisogiin tuuver – Sample of Mongolian Riddles" with 615 riddles by B. Sodnom 1938
- "Mongoliin hoshin ulger – Mongolian Comedies" 53 tales by with G. Rinchinsambuu and B. Sodnom 1961
- "Yavgan ulgeruud - Folk tales" by B. Sodnom 1956
- "Mal aj ahuin tuhay aman zohioliin emhetgel – Fictional Farm Animal Oral Literature Collection" by B. Sodnom 1946
- "Tooni uhaani ner tomiyo – Dictionary of Math", "Dictionary of Chemistry", "Oros ardiin ulger – Russian National Tale Story" By B. Renchin, B.Sodnom 1953
- "Mal aj ahuin aman zohiol – Oral literature of Farm Animals" by B. Sodnom 1956
- "Ardiin aman zohioliin emhgetgel – National Collection of Oral Literature" with by B. Natsag and B. Sodnom 1956
- "D.Natsagdorjiin zohioliin emhetgel – Collected by D. Natsagdorj literature" By B. Sodnom 1955
- "Adguusan amitaiin tuhay ulgeruud – Wild Animals Story" by K. D. Ushinsky, translated by B. Sodnom 1955, edited by B. Baast
- "Mongol ardiin zuir ug – Wise words of Mongolian National Literature " with L. Mishig, B. Sodnom, edited by Ya. Tsevel 1956
- "Nomiin sangiin ner tomiyo – Library Catalogue" with M. Danzan, B. Sodnom – 1956
- "Utga zohioliin ner tomiyo – Dictionary of Literature" B. Sodnom, edited by B. Renchin 1958
- "Ardiin neg duunii tuhay – About One Folk Song" with Studia Foloclorica.. Tomus. I. Fasc. By B. Sodnom 1959
- "D.Natsagdorj uran zohioliin tohimol – Fiction Literature of D. Natsagdorj" by B. Sodnom 1959
- "Study of Mongol" about D. Natsagdorj's Literature (1906–1937), boti-1 -book- I and 22 chapters, By Sodnom 1956
- "Tömör zamiin ner tomiyo – Dictionary of Railroad Terms" T. Piljee, E. Banduy, edited by B. Sodnom – 1959
- "Mongol duunii tuuh – History of Mongolian Songs" Boti-1 Book-1, By B. Sodnom 1960
- "Maliin butetsiin ner tomiyo – Dictionory of Farm Animal's Zoology" with Ts. Toivgoo, B.Sodnom - 1960
- "D.Nastagdorj (1906-1937) By B.Sodnom, edited by Ts. Damdinsuren – 1961
- "Eriin gurvan naadmiin yaruu nairagiin emhetgel – Poetry of Naadam (Mongolian festival)" Ts.Shagdargochoo, edited by D. Darjaa and B. Sodnom - 1961
- "Study of Language and Literature" History of Mongolian national work – boti 1 – book 1" – by B. Sodnom 1963
- "Ardiin buuvein duunii tuhai – About National Lullaby Songs" boti- II – book-II, By B.Sodnom 1963
- "Urgamliin zarim ner tomiyo – Dictionary of Some Plants" H. Galya, edited by B. Sodnom 1963
- "Mongol ardiin ertötsiin gurav, döröv – World's Wisdom of Words of Mongolian National Literature" , in Study of Mongolia by B. Sodnom 1964
- "D. Nastagdorj namtar zohiol –D. Natsagdorj's biography and his literature" By B. Sodnom 1966
- Opera "Hatan Dolgor, harts Damdin – Queen Dolgor and Serve Damdin" duuri,"Study of Mongols" by B. Sodnom 1966
- "Buchil butets sudlaliin ner tomiyo – Dictionary of Entomology" boti II – Book II, H. Tseren, edited by B. Sodnom, J. Tömörtseren 1967
- "Huuhdiin övchin sudlal", ner tomiyo – Dictionary of Study of Children's diseases" boti III – book III, J. Radnaabazar, edited by B. Sodnom, J. Tömörtseren – 1967
- "Mongol uran zohioliin toim (1849-1916) – Analyzation of Mongolian literature (1849-1916)" book III, Hishigbat, edited by B. Sodnom 1967
- "Mes zasaliin ner tomiyo – Dictionary of Medical surgery" L. Gepel, S. Navaansamdan, boti III – book III, edited by B. Sodnom 1968
- "Shuvuunii ner tomiyo – Dictionary of bird" Ya. Tsend-Ayush, Choy. Luvsanjav, edited by B. Sodnom – 1969–1970

"*Dictionary of Russian and Mongolian" J.Dashdorj, E.Banduy,boti II-book II, edited by B. Sodnom 1970

- "Mongol esgii geriin ner tomiyo – Dictionary of Mongolian home Terms (ger)" By B. Sodnom 1971
- "Niseh ongotsnii ner tomiyo – Dictionary of airplane Terms" S. Tserendorj, Choy. Luvsanjav, edited by B. Sodnom 1976
- "D.Nastagdorjiin eh zohioliin sudalgaa – Study of D. Nastagdor original literature" By B. Sodnom edited by Ts. Mönk 1978
- D. Nastagdorj oroltsoo - "Yarguu – Lily" Zaluuchuudiin zohiolchdiin tuuver – literature of Young writers with D.Nastagdorj" By B.Sodnom 1978
- "Auto teeveriin ner tomiyo – Dictionary of auto transportation" B.Enebish, P.Shurchuluu, edited by .B.Sodnom, Choi. Luvsanjav 1978
- "Oros mongol ner tomiyo – Dictionary of Russian and Mongolian" E. Bandu;, B.Sodnom, Go.Mijigdorj, H. Luvsanbaldan, edited by A.Luvsandendev 1979
- "D.Nastagdorj zarim uran zohiolin sudalgaa – Study of D.Nastagdorj's literature" by B. Sodnom 1980
- "Literature of D.Nastagdorj (1906-1937)by B.Sodnom at "Mongol hel bichig – Mongolian language", 1981 Shiliin gol
- "Uneg ba zaraa – Fox and hedgehog" by B. Sodnom printed by "Mongoliin uran zohioliin deedes – Best Mongolian literature" 1997
- "Dalai noyoni daanch teneg huu – Moran son of Mr.Dalay", by B. Sodnom printed by "Mongoliin uran zohioliin deedes – Best Mongolian literature" 1997
- "Manai ahmad zohiolchid – our senior writers – about B.Sodnom" printed by "Mongoliin uran zohioliin deedes – Best Mongolian literature" 1998
- "B.Sodnomiin namtar buteeluud – B.Sodnom's biography and his Literature Collection" By S. Uzmee, edited by P. Horloo, D. Ölziibayar 1998 at Indiana University and Library of Congress
- "Zohioliig saijruulah tal deer l bi jaahan ym hiij chadah bolov uu daa" By B.Sodnom printed by "Dal" newspaper 1998
- "Tod mongol usgeer bichsen uran zohioliin dursgalaas – Mark of Tod in old Mongolian scrip literature" By B.Sodnom "Study of same bold scrip" 1999 Ulaanbaatar
- "Baldan Sodnom Zohiol tuuver – Literature of Baldan Sodnom" by D.Tsedev 2008–2009 at Indiana University and Library of Congress.
- "Baldan Sodnom tuuver buteel – Study of Baldan Sodnom" By D.Tsedev 2008–2009 at Indiana University and Library of Congress
- "Baldan Sodnom D.Nastagdorj sudlal – Baldan Sodnom and Study of D.Nastagdorj" By D. Tsedev 2008–2009 at Indiana University and Library of Congress
- "Genghis Khan's twin stallion" by B. Sodnom, translated in English by Sodnom U. Pigg, edited by Catherine T. Pigg 2017 – at Amazon, at Indiana University
- "Chighis Haani er hoyor zagal – Genghis khan's twin stallion" by Mongolian language by Sodnom U.Pigg, edited by A.Alimaa 2018 at Amazon, at Indiana University *

Published in English:

- "Preaching's of the Mongolian black shamans", ","Transactions of the Mongolian philologists" By. B.Sodnom 1960-1975 Ulaanbaatar
- "To the history of Mongolian black Sharman's","Transactions of the Mongolian philologists" by B. Sodnom 1960-1975 Ulaanbaatar
- "Life and work of D. Natsagdorj" ","Transactions of the Mongolian philologists" By B. Sodnom 1960-1975 Ulaanbaatar
- "Mongolian charms" ","Transactions of the Mongolian philologists" By. B.Sodnom 1960-1975 Ulaanbaatar
- "Well – wishing" ","Transactions of the Mongolian philologists" By. B.Sodnom 1960-1975 Ulaanbaatar
- On the problem of the composition of "Transparent Tamir", ","Transactions of the Mongolian philologists" By. B.Sodnom 1960-1975 Ulaanbaatar
- "About one song" ","Transactions of the Mongolian philologists" By. B.Sodnom 1960-1975 Ulaanbaatar
- From the literary monuments of "velar sctipt" ","Transactions of the Mongolian philologists" By. B.Sodnom 1960-1975 Ulaanbaatar

== TV ==
- TV: - Program of Friend of the Same Pen - Moscow 1966
- "Aldar Hurteegui altan erdene – Unknowing treasure" about B.Sodnom's biography
- Movie: - https://www.youtube.com/watch?v=IHntDhtDwiY
- "Aldar Hurteegui altan erdene – Unknowing treasure" about B.Sodnom's biography
