= The Lemons (Mongolian band) =

Mongolian rock band

- Origin: Ulaanbaatar, Mongolia
- Genres: Rock, pop rock, indie rock, electronic rock, post punk
- Years active: 2004–present
- Label: Hi-Fi
- Members: Odnoo (Odbayar); Tulgaa (Enkhtulga); Anar; Uujgii (Unurbayar)
- Website: thelemons.mn

The Lemons is a Mongolian rock band formed in 2004, Ulaanbaatar, Mongolia. They released their debut album Red in December 2006.

== Members and activities ==
The band consists of 4 members, lead singer Ts. Odbayar (Odnoo), guitarist A. Enkhtulga (Tulgaa), bassist D. Anar, and drummer M. Unurbayar (Uujgii). Lead singer and rhythm guitarist Odnoo is known for his style. His sunglasses and hat are frequently associated with him and the band. Lead singer Odnoo was a guitarist in a metal band called 'Metronome', guitarist Tulgaa was also in a different band called 'Midnight' before joining together as The Lemons. As kids, they were all interested in and passionate about music, specially Rock music, and were somewhat related musically. Band bassist Anar graduated from Music and Dance College of Mongolia, guitarist Tulgaa's family background were connected to music, and they connected and found each other through their common interest in live music.

The band gained a following after their set at the 2006 Playtime Festival (Mongolia's first and largest rock festival). After their first performance at Playtime festival they started to participate annually as they continuously gained a common crowd. Their annual performances at Playtime have consistently been lauded. They are known by their unique fresh and memorable music and deeply poetic lyrics. Almost every song is written in Mongolian language and they said in an interview about how melody comes first and the suitable lyrics comes afterwards. The Lemons enjoys modernist writers of Mongolia such as Ayurzana, and Ulziitugs; which one of their song 'Shunu Dund Tsas Orj Baina (Snowing at midnight)' is written by Ulziitugs's poem with same name.

== Discography ==
Their Red Album was the first rock album released by a Mongolian band to achieve national commercial success without heavily compromising its rock sound. Critics described it as sounding similar to early work of The Strokes. Its hits were Hairtai (Love you) and Zuud Noirondoo(in the dream) (transcribed from the Mongolian Cyrillic alphabet). The band was able to devote its energies full-time to music and began playing multiple shows a week at Ulaanbaatar music venues.

In 2009, The Lemons released their second album, Залуу Ленины Ойролцоо Зн Давхарт (roughly translates to: On the 3rd floor, around young Lenin.) It expanded the band's sound to include influences from post rock to punk rock. Due to its more challenging sound, the album was less popular than their first effort, though in the three years since their first album the core Mongolian rock audience had expanded significantly and almost universally declared it a triumph.

In 2015, The Lemons released their third studio album, III. The album consists of 10 tracks, most famous tracks are Сүүлийн уянга (Suuliin uyanga) and Paradise. At the same year, The Lemons performed their 3rd big concert at Crocus Event Hall, in Mongolia. Their third studio album 'III' attained a nationwide cult status due to its marketable pop synth blend.

In 2016 May, The Lemons performed their first and last 'Unplugged' concert at Mongolian State Academic Theatre of Opera and Ballet. They performed their most famous songs and cover songs by their favorite artists with acoustic guitars and orchestra. Following the 'Unplugged' concert, they released an 'Unplugged album' and DVD of the concert.

In 2018, they released their first 'Red album' in a vinyl form with only 500 copies.

In 2023, the Lemons also released their "III" album on vinyl.

Albums
2006	Red Album	Zuud Noirondoo; Tsenher Nud; Budiig Ankh Haraad Tursun Setgegdel; Eleg Buur; Khairtai; Melkhii Gunj; Shaasi Ma; Gerelt Khotiin Gudamj; Harah Durtai; Ulaanbaatariin Udesh	Studio
2009	On the 3rd Floor, around Young Lenin	1983..86; Misheel; Earth; Tsag Agaar; Yadargaa; Sex, Rock, & ...; Baisan; Aldagdsan Ayalguu; The HooFa; Uur Ertunts; Shunu Dund Tsas Orj Baina	Hi-Fi Media Group
2015	III	Earth II; Dulguun; Husel; Monad; Har Hereeni Duuli; Paradise; Suuliin Uyanga; Uur Ugluu; Ulaan Hot; Gurvan Uliral	White Arch Studio Hi-Fi Media Group
2016	Lemons Unplugged in UB	Tsenher Nud; Dulguun; Harah Durtai; Paradise; Monad; Melhii Gunj; Sex, Rock, & ...; Shunu Dund Tsas Orj Baina; Budiig Anh Haraad Tursun Setgegdel; Eleg Buur; 1983..86; Tsag Agaar; Suulin Uyanga; Hairtai; Husel; Gurvan Uliral	
2018	Red Album Vinyl		
2023	III Album Vinyl		
