= Dain ba Enkh =

Mongolian hip hop group

Dain ba Enkh Дайн ба Энх
- Origin: Ulaanbaatar, Mongolia
- Genres: Hip-hop; Rap
- Years active: 1996–present
- Labels: Ödör tutam; Neg chigt
- Members: MC Aav; Naba; Bizzy; Ezi; Ikser (XR); Horon
- Past members: MCIT

Dain Ba Enkh (Mongolian: War and Peace) is one of the first Mongolian hip-hop groups, established in 1996. In its beginning, it consisted of MCIT, MC Aav, Bizzy, Ezi, Ikser (XR), and Khoron. Writing all their songs themselves and composing them of "highly necessary words", they engaged with political and social matters right from the beginning. Their philosophical lyrics were influenced by poetic heritage and figur of the Mongolian dissident poet Ryenchinii Choinom. They won the competition of Radio 107.5 in the category Best Newcomer with their song "Zogsoltgüi" ("Eternal"). They have published two albums, Ödör tutam (From Day to Day) (1999), being the first hip-hop album published in Mongolia, and Neg chigt (To One Direction) (2001). When MCIT quit the band in 2002, it became quiet around the band, but its activities didn't completely cease, e.g. they published the song "76" (which is the number of seats in the Mongolian parliament) together with Ice Top, a leading hip-hop band of Mongolia in the first decade of the 21st century.

== Ödör tutam (From Day to Day) ==
1. Эхлэл (Prologue)
2. Хэрээ мэд (Know your limits)
3. Зогсолтгүй (Eternal)
4. Гүн ухаан (Philosophy)
5. Хүн (Human)
6. Залуу нас (Youth)
7. Зарим гаруудад зориулав (To some guys)
8. Хүүхэд хэзээ ч хүүхдээрээ байхгүй (Kids never remain kids)
9. Х-Сургаал (X-teaching)
10. Мөнгө (Money)
11. Өдөр тутам (From day to day)
12. Дайн ба энхийн сэтгэл (The spirit of war & peace)
13. Амьдрал бидэнд бий (We got life)
14. Чи заавал янхан байх ёстой гэж үү (Why d'ya gotta be a whore?)
15. Намайг гэсэн хайр (The love for me)
16. Намайг гэсэн хайр (The love for me - remix)
17. Эрч хүчтэй залуу нас (Vigorous Youth)
18. Төгсгөл (Epilogue)

== Neg chigt (In One Direction) ==
1. Эхлэл (Beginning)
2. Чойном (Choinom)
3. Үхэл ослыг холдуул зайлуул (Evade accident and death)
4. Нэр бол (As for the name)
5. Дараагийн удаа (Next time)
6. Дайн (War)
7. ФМ 107.5-д өгсөн ярилцлагаас... (From an interview on FM 107.5)
8. Энх (Peace)
9. Сайхан сэтгэлээ хадгалж яв (Preserve your friendly character)
10. Нэг чигт (In one direction)
11. Амьдрал ганц (Life alone)
12. Ерөнхийлөгчид бичсэн захидал (Letter to the president)
13. Цагдаа (Police)
14. Жүүлэх
15. Жүүлэх [ремикс]
16. Төгсгөл (End)
