= Melodiya =

Russian record label

- Parent company: Formax JSC
- Founded: 1964
- Founder: Ministry of Culture of the Soviet Union
- Distributor: Zvonko Digital (since 2015)
- Genre: Various
- Country of origin: Soviet Union
- Official website: melody.su/en/

Melodiya (Russian: Мелодия, lit. 'Melody') is a Russian record label. It was the state-owned major record company of the Soviet Union.

== History ==
Melodiya was established in 1964 as the "All-Union Gramophone Record Firm of the USSR Ministry of Culture Melodiya" in accordance with a resolution issued by the Council of Ministers of the Soviet Union. It utilized numerous recording studios and manufacturing facilities throughout the USSR as well as powerful centres of distribution and promotional strategies. The best selling format at the time was 33⅓ and 78 rpm vinyl records. By 1973, Melodiya released some 1,200 gramophone records with a total circulation of 190–200 million per year, in addition to 1 million compact cassettes per year, was exporting its production to more than 70 countries.

The label's output was dominated by Western classical music, music by Soviet composers and musicians, performances by Soviet theater actors, and fairy tales for children. For example, Melodiya notably released performances of works by Tchaikovsky and Shostakovich. Melodiya also released some of the most successful western pop, jazz and rock records, including albums by ABBA, Paul McCartney, Boney M., Dave Grusin, Dalida, Amanda Lear, and Bon Jovi. Melodiya also regularly released records by popular Soviet singers, among whom were Alla Pugacheva, Vladimir Vysotsky, Bulat Okudzhava, Sofia Rotaru, Mikhail Boyarsky, Valery Leontiev, Alexander Barykin, Vladimir Kuzmin, as well as Soviet rock groups Autograph, Mashina Vremeni, Bravo, and Cruise.

Soviet 7-inch record of The Beatles's songs "Octopus's Garden" and "Something", with "Come Together" on the reverse.

In other countries, Melodiya recordings imported from the USSR were often sold under the label MK, which stood for Mezhdunarodnaya Kniga (Μеждународная книга, 'International Book').

Being state owned until April 1989, the Soviet recording industry was able to apply a single numbering system to all its releases from 1933 onward, regardless of origin or place of manufacture. The number sequences for 78s and LPs are strictly chronological, from which it is possible to date many, though not all, releases using only the catalogue number

Since 2008, some Melodiya records have been available to North American listeners through the Canadian classical label Analekta, which is distributed by Entertainment One Distribution in the US and Distribution Select in Canada.

Melodiya is working with the archive. As of 2023, more than 80% of the archive has been digitized and 2,400 digital albums have been published; since 2014, more than 100 vinyl records have been published.

== Notable artists ==
Thousands of artists have appeared on the Melodiya label. For a partial list, see List of Melodiya artists.

== See also ==
- List of record labels
