= WASABI architecture =

Approach to agent affect simulation

WASABI Affect Simulation Architecture
- Developer: Christian Becker-Asano
- Initial release: 2011
- Written in: C++, Qt
- Available in: English
- Type: Scientific computing
- License: LGPL
- Website: www.becker-asano.de/index.php/research/wasabi

The WASABI architecture is an approach for simulating emotions for human computer interation, especially embodied agents and social robots. It is motivated by Affective Computing in that it tries to simulate human affect.

WASABI was also implemented as open-source simulation software. It provides a graphical user interface based on Qt.
