= Ariunaa =

Mongolian singer (born 1967)

Ariunaa Ариунаа
- Born: Ariunaa Tumur; 15 March 1967 (age 59); Ulaanbaatar, Mongolia
- Genres: Pop
- Occupation: Singer
- Instrument: Vocals
- Years active: 1980s–present

Tömöriin Ariunaa (Mongolian: Төмөрийн Ариунаа; born 15 March 1967), known mononymously as Ariunaa, is a Mongolian pop singer. Often referred to as the "Madonna of Mongolia", she is compared to Russia's Alla Pugacheva, and popular with fans for her "singing style, provocative subject matter, and charisma". Her voice type is "Dramatic soprano", and sing in 3 octaves approximately. Also, she's best known as a "Mongolian Pop Diva".

== Biography ==
Ariunaa was born in Ulaanbaatar, and began performing when she was 15. In 1986, she studied music in Bulgaria.

She released her first solo album, Eros, in 1996. Her most successful hits are "Blue Jeans", "16 nas", "Taliin Mongol Ail" and "Nandin Uchral". In 2017, she released "Utasnii Chin Dugaar" as a part of COSMIC PROJECT It is rumored to have cost 100 million tugrik for the musical short film "Legendary Morning" (Домгийн өглөө) and over 200 people were involved in the production.

Aruinaa has toured in Yugoslavia, South Korea, Japan, and the United States.

== Personal life ==
Aruinaa's husband, G. Buyandorj, is president of Noyod Group. They have two children. In 2002, she was appointed as UN Ambassador for children. She also founded an organization to help children with disabilities.

== Discography ==
- Эрос No.1 (Eros 1) (1996)
- Зөвхөн чиний тухай (Zȯvkhȯn chiniĭ tukhaĭ) (1999)
- Чи минь (Chi minʹ) (2001)
- Хаврын шөнийн бодол (2002)
- Миний шинэ орон зай (2003)
- Дурлал шиг асна (2006)
- "Be like Heaven" (2019)
