= The Wasabies =

Mongolian girl-group

Background information
- Origin: Ulaanbaatar, Mongolia
- Genres: Pop; Contemporary R&B
- Years active: 2018–present
- Labels: Leto Music Company; Amantun Music Group Co., Ltd
- Members: BUIKA; ANUKA; WINDY; JASMINE
- Past members: Aminkhuslen; Enkhgerel; Angelina
- Website: Official website

The Wasabies (Mongolian: Васабис; stylized in all caps) is a Mongolian girl group formed through the first season of Edutainment TV‘s version of the French reality television show Star Academy (Mongolian: Оддын Академи). The group consists of four members: BUIKA, ANUKA, WINDY, and JASMINE.

The girl group debuted with their extended play (EP) Girls Generation on December 7, 2018.

== Name ==
The group's name was given by their producer and songwriter Naranzun. It is based on Japanese spicy paste “Wasabi”, which is commonly served with sushi. “The Wasabies” shows the group's strong, unique, and spicy concept.

== History ==
=== Formation through Star Academy ===
The Wasabies was formed through the first season of reality television show Star Academy (Mongolian: Оддын Академи), which aired on Edutainment TV. Out of an initial twelve contestants, the final five were announced to debut as a group. Prior to appearing on the show, Buyandulam was a dancer and a choreographer under Aim4r Production.

The group was sponsored with ₮100 million (approximately $35000) by Mongolian telecom company G-Mobile. Later, the group was participated in Mongol TV's version of the American reality television show Shark Tank (Mongolian: Шарк Танк) and won an investment of ₮100 million (approximately $35000) from Oyungerel, chief executive officer (CEO) of "Petrovis Group" and Enkhtuvshin, vice president of "MCS Group". The group was signed to a Mongolian record label Leto Music Company.

=== Debut with Girls Generation ===
The group's debut extended play (EP) Girls Generation was released on December 7, 2018, by Leto Music Company and Amantun Music Group Co., Ltd, after releasing the music videos for “Girls Generation”, “U-gui (Don't)”, “Bestie”, and “Love #1”. Later on March 20, 2019, they released the music video for “Toy", and on August 22, 2019, they released the music video for "Runaway”, announcing the member Angelina would be taking a break from the group. After releasing the extended play (EP), The Wasabies held their first fan meeting at White Rock Center in May 4, 2019.

==== New year special single ====
The group released a new year special single "Shine On Irlee" with music video on December 9, 2019.

=== Comeback with Time Machine ===
On June 19, 2020, the group announced their comeback with second extended play (EP) Time Machine. The extended play (EP) would have six tracks, "This Is Love" as its lead single. The music video for "This Is Love" was released on June 26, 2020. Their second single from the album “Xac” was released on September 24, 2020. The project was then cancelled due to members leaving the group.

=== Butterfly Project ===
The group announced their new project Butterfly with new members WINDY and JASMINE, on August 13, 2021, through their official YouTube channel. The first release of their project "Girlfriend" was released on August 16, 2021. The following single "Somehow" was released on January 21, 2023. The release was featured as a soundtrack for "Yaaraltai Tuslamjiin Tasgiinhan", a Mongolian television series produced by Nomadia Pictures and Ufilm Production.

==== Japanese debut ====
It was announced that the group would be making their debut in Japan, on February 26, 2022, through their official YouTube channel. In August, 2022, the group reportedly went to Japan to prepare for their debut. Their Japanese debut single "JELLY BEANS", in collaboration with Japanese shoe brand with the same name, was released on September 26, 2022, on their official Japanese YouTube channel.

== Members ==
- Buyandulam (Буяндулам)
- Anujin (Анужин)
- WINDY
- JASMINE

Former members

- Enkhgerel (Энхгэрэл)
- Aminkhuslen (Аминхүслэн)
- Angelina (Ангелина)

== Discography ==
=== Extended plays ===
List of extended plays, with selected details, tracks
Title	Details	Tracks
Girls Generation	Released: December 7, 2018; Label: Leto Music Company, Amantun Music Group Co., Ltd; Formats: CD, digital download, streaming	Girls Generation; U-gui (Don't); Love #1; Bestie; Toy; Runaway
Unknown album	Upcoming; Label: Leto Music Company	N/A

=== Singles ===
List of singles, with selected details, albums
Title	Details	Albums
Shine On Irlee	Released: December 9, 2019; Label: Leto Music Company; New year special single	Non-album single
This Is Love	Released: June 26, 2020; Label: Leto Music Company; Formats: digital download, streaming	Digital single
Xac	Released: September 26, 2020; Label: Leto Music Company; Formats: digital download, streaming	Digital single
Girlfriend	Released: September 20, 2021; Label: Leto Music Company; Formats: digital download, streaming	Digital single
Somehow	Released: April 14, 2022; Label: Leto Music Company; Formats: digital download, streaming	Digital single
Yahkadagan	Released: February 27, 2023; Label: Leto Music Company; Formats: digital download, streaming	Digital single
Jelly Beans	Genre: J-Pop; Released: May 13, 2022; Label: Leto Music Company; Formats: digital download, streaming	Digital single
Ayandaa (with Vandebo)	Released: June 1, 2022; Label: Leto Music Company; Formats: digital download, streaming	Digital single
