= Ryenchinii Choinom =

Mongolian poet (1936–1979)

- Ренчиний Чойном
- Born: 10 February 1936; Darkhan, Mongolian People's Republic
- Died: 24 April 1979 (aged 43)
- Writing career
- Language: Mongolian; Kazakh

Ryenchinii Choinom (/riˈɛntʃi ˈtʃɔɪnɒm/ ree-EN-chee CHOY-nom; Mongolian: Ренчиний Чойном; 10 February 1936 – 24 April 1979) was a Mongolian poet. He was born on 10 February 1936 in the Darkhan, a sum of the Khentii Province, and died of tuberculosis in 1979. Choinom's poems are famous for their fearlessness and realism. Throughout his life, his poems were widely popular but never received any official recognition under communist Mongolia. Many of his love lyrics became popular songs and Mongolian hip-hop compositions influence. He was jailed from 6 August 1969 till 1973 under pretext of writing poems that neglect the "Socialist achievements" and his works were prohibited. He continued to write while in prison.

Choinom graduated from the literature department of the National University of Mongolia, and pursued a productive literary career that gave birth to several novels and to collections of poems such as "Sumtei Budaryn Chuluu". Beside Mongolian, he also wrote in Kazakh.

In 1991, Choinom was posthumously issued the Mongolian National Honor.

== Works ==
- Hour of the fire horse (Гал морин цаг)
- Young age (Залуу нас)
- With a Temple Stone (Сүмтэй бударын чулуу)
- Steppe (Тал)
- Red Notebook (Улаан дэвтэр)
- Human (Хүн)
- A Letter to the Daughter (Охиндоо бичсэн захидал)
- Puppy (Гөлөг)
