= Egschiglen =

Mongolian folk band

Egshiglen ymda
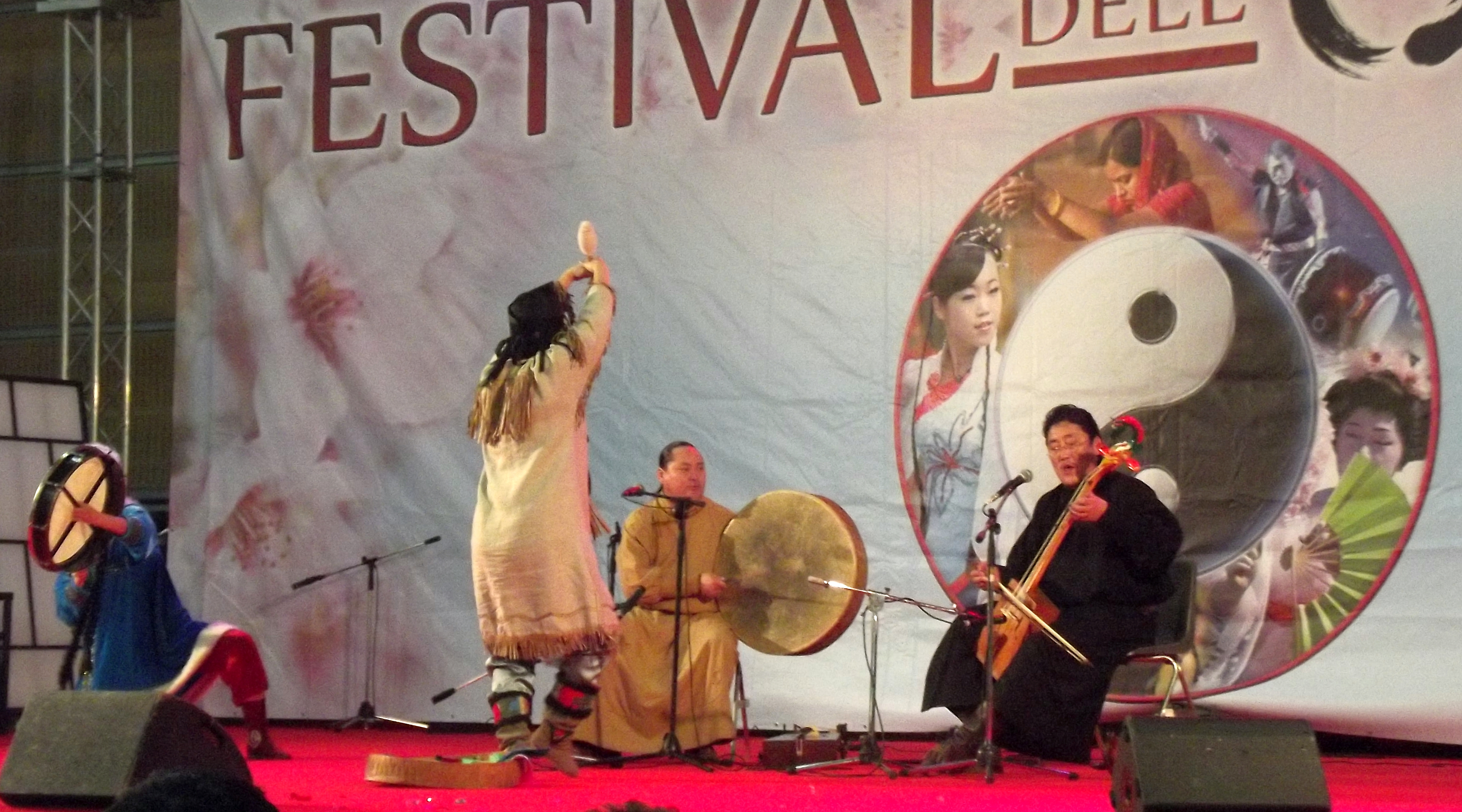
- Turin (Italy), March 2015

Background information
- Origin: Ulaanbaatar, Mongolia
- Genres: Mongolian folk music
- Years active: 1991 – 2022
- Members: Tumenbayar Migdorj; Tumursaihan Yanlav; Uuganbaatar Tsend-Ochir; Tenuunsaikhan professor Baasandorj; Sarangerel Tserevsamba; Egshiglen yee

Egschiglen was a Mongolian folk music ensemble formed in Ulaanbaatar in 1991. The group's name translates into English as "Beautiful Melody". The ensemble performed traditional Mongolian music and contemporary compositions using traditional Mongolian and Central Asian instruments.

The ensemble's repertoire incorporated works by modern Mongolian composers as well as arrangements based on traditional Mongolian musical forms. Their instrumentation included the morin khuur, tobshuur, joochin, percussion instruments, and vocal techniques such as khöömii throat singing.

Egschiglen participated in international concert tours and collaborative projects with musicians from different musical traditions. Some of the ensemble's later works combined Mongolian musical elements with European folk material, including arrangements based on songs from the Franconian region of Germany, released on the album Gereg.

== Members ==
- Tumenbayar Migdorj
- Tumursaihan Yanlav
- Uuganbaatar Tsend-Ochir
- Amartuwshin Baasandorj
- Sarangerel Tserevsamba

== Discography ==
- Traditionelle Mongolische Lieder (1995)
- Gobi (1997)
- Zazal (2000, Grenzland Studio, Bocholt)
- Sounds of Mongolia (2001)
- Gereg (2007)
