= List of one-word stage names =

This is a list of notable people best known by a stage name consisting of a single word.

This list does not include -

- famous people who are commonly referred to only by their first name (e.g. Adele, Beyoncé, Elvis, Madonna).
- famous people who are commonly referred to only by their surname (e.g. Liberace, Mantovani, Morrissey, Mozart, Shakespeare); it is quite common and regular for surnames to be used to identify historic and pop culture figures.
- members of music groups without an individual article (e.g. Bigflo & Oli, Cindy and Bert, Chitãozinho & Xororó).

== A ==
- Aarne (born 2001), Romanian music producer
- Abadon, American professional wrestler
- Abbas (born 1975), Indian actor
- Abdominal (born 1974), Canadian rapper
- Abhirami (born 1983), Indian actress
- Abi (born 1997), American singer-songwriter
- Above (born 1981), American street artist
- Abra (born 1989), American singer and songwriter
- Abra (born 1990), Filipino rapper, hip hop recording artist and occasional actor
- Abradab (born 1978), Polish rapper and music producer
- Abyale, French singer
- Abyss (born 1973), American wrestler
- Acero (born 1984), Mexican professional wrestler
- Aceyalone (born 1970), American rapper
- ACH (born 1987), American professional wrestler
- Aco (born 1977), Japanese singer
- Adaam (born 2002), Swedish rapper
- Adamski (born 1967), English music producer
- Adassa (born 1987), American singer-songwriter
- Adé (born 1995), French musician and singer
- Adeem (born 1978), American rapper
- Adena, Romanian singer-songwriter
- Aderet (born 1976), Israeli entertainer
- Adeva (born 1960), American musician
- Adeyto (born 1976), French singer-songwriter, actress and director
- Adie (born 2001), Filipino singer and songwriter
- Adieu (born 2000), Japanese singer and actress
- Adira (born 1991), Malaysian singer
- Adithyan (1954–2017), Indian film score and soundtrack composer
- Adje (born 1982), Dutch rapper
- Ado (born 2002), Japanese singer-songwriter
- Adonxs (born 1995), Slovak singer-songwriter, model and dancer
- Adora (born 1997), South Korean singer, songwriter and record producer
- Adriana, Colombian-Canadian drag performer
- Ad-Rock born 1966, American rapper, musician and actor
- Aéreo (born 1989), Mexican professional wrestler
- Aeroplane (born 1982), Belgian music producer and DJ
- Afgan (born 1989), Indonesian singer and actor
- Afra (born 1980), Japanese beatboxer
- Afrob (born 1977), Italian-born German rapper
- Afrojack (born 1987), Dutch music producer and DJ
- Afroman (born 1974), American rapper and musician
- Agallah (aka 8-Off, Swagallah; born 1974), American rapper and record producer
- Agape, American rapper and musician
- Agepê (1942–1995), Brazilian singer and composer
- Agha (1914–1992), Indian Bollywood actor
- Agir (born 1988), Portuguese singer, composer and producer
- Agoria (born 1976), French electronic record producer, composer and DJ
- Aiah (born 2001), Filipino model, singer and dancer
- Aid (born 1990), Spanish rapper, singer, songwriter and record producer
- Aidonia (born 1981), Jamaican musician
- Aiko (born 1999), Russian-Czech singer and songwriter
- Ailee (born 1989), American-South Korean singer and songwriter
- Ailyn (born 1982), Spanish singer
- AiM (born 1975), Japanese voice actress and singer
- Aimer, Japanese pop singer and lyricist
- Aimyon (born 1995), Japanese singer and songwriter
- Airi, Japanese singer
- Aisha (born 1962), English singer
- Aitch (born 1999), British rapper
- Aja (born 1994), American rapper, reality television personality and drag queen
- Ajdar (born 1973), Turkish singer-songwriter
- Ajith (born 1971), Indian Tamil actor
- Ajoo (born 1990), South Korean singer
- AKA (1988–2023), South African rapper
- Akala (born 1983), British rap and hip hop artist
- Akam (born 1993), Canadian wrestler
- Akamz (born 2000), French dancer, comedian and social media personality
- Akari (born 1994), Chilean professional wrestler
- Akarova (1904–1999), Belgian dancer and choreographer
- Akhenaton (born 1968), French rapper and producer
- Akillezz (born 1994), American rapper
- Akir, American hip hop artist and producer
- Akira (born 1981), Japanese actor and dancer
- Akira (born 1993), American professional wrestler
- Akon (born 1973), Senegalese hip-hop artist
- Akriila (born 2003), Chilean singer-songwriter and rapper
- Akrobatik (born 1974), American rapper
- Aksana (born 1982), Lithuanian fitness model and professional wrestler
- Akufen (born 1966), Canadian electronic musician
- Akuma (born 1996), Mexican professional wrestler
- Alan (born 1973), Mexican actor and singer
- Alaska (born 1963), Spanish-Mexican singer
- Alastair (1887–1969), German composer, dancer and singer
- ALB (born 1979), French electro-pop musician
- Albela (1941–2004), Pakistani actor
- Albert (1789–1865), French ballet dancer
- Alee, Canadian singer-songwriter
- Alejandro (born 1993), Japanese professional wrestler
- Alemán (born 1990), Mexican rapper
- Alesso (born 1991), Swedish DJ, record producer and musician
- AleXa (born 1996), American-South Korean singer
- Alexandra (1942–1969), German singer
- Alexia (born 1967), Italian singer
- Alexis (born 1968), German singer
- Aleyn, English composer
- Alfa (born 2000), Italian singer and rapper
- Alfons (born 1967), French comedian
- Algérino, or L'Algérino (born 1980), French rapper of Algerian descent
- Ali (1956–1994), American artist and musician
- Ali (born 1967), Indian actor
- Ali (born 1975), French rapper
- Ali (born 1984), South Korean singer
- Ali (born 1986), American wrestler
- Alias (1976–2018), American rapper, producer and record label founder
- Alice (born 1954), Italian singer-songwriter and pianist
- Alice (born 1990), South Korean singer and actress
- Alika (born 1977), Uruguayan–Argentine rapper, singer, songwriter and reggae musician
- Alişan (born 1976), Turkish singer and actor
- Alisia (born 1983), Bulgarian singer
- Aliyah (born 1994), Canadian wrestler
- Alizzz (born 1984), Spanish record producer, songwriter and singer
- Allâme (born 1987), Turkish rapper and songwriter
- Allday (born 1991), Australian rapper, singer and songwriter
- Allie (born 1987), Canadian professional wrestler
- Alligatoah (born 1989), German rapper, singer, producer and DJ
- Alloise (born 1984), Ukrainian singer
- Alma (born 1988), French singer and songwriter
- Almighty (born 1995), Cuban rapper and singer
- Alonzo (born 1982), French hip hop artist and rapper
- Alsarah (born 1982), Sudanese-American singer and songwriter
- Altimet (born 1978), Malaysian composer, lyricist, actor and singer
- Alu, American singer-songwriter and musician
- Alvan (born 1993), French singer and songwriter
- Alvaro (born 1987), Dutch record producer, songwriter and DJ
- Alvilda, Belgian drag performer
- Alyosha (born 1986), Ukrainian singer
- ALYPH (born 1989), Singaporean-Malay singer, performer, songwriter, composer and producer
- Amadeus (born 1962), Italian presenter
- Amandititita (born 1982), Mexican singer-songwriter
- Amara (born 1975), Indonesian singer, actress and model
- Ambareesh (1952–2018), Indian actor and media personality
- Amber (born 1969), Dutch-German singer-songwriter
- Amee (born 2000), Vietnamese singer
- A-Mei (aka A-mei, a-MEI, a MEI, Chang Hui-mei; born 1972), Taiwanese Puyuma singer-songwriter
- Amen (born 1972), Finnish guitarist
- Amenazzy (born 1995), Dominican singer
- Amerado (born 1995), Ghanaian rapper
- Américo (born 1977), Chilean singer-songwriter
- AMES (born 1985), American singer, songwriter and musician
- Amethyst (born 1995), American drag performer
- AMG (born 1970), American rapper
- AMI (born 1989), Romanian singer and songwriter
- Amidou (1935–2013), Moroccan actor
- Aminé (born 1994), American rapper and singer
- Amoc (born 1984), Finnish rap musician
- Ampichino (born 1976), American rapper and producer
- AmpLive, American alternative hip hop producer and DJ
- Amwe (born 1984), Japanese singer, songwriter, composer and producer
- Anacani (born 1954), Mexican-born American singer
- Anagnorisis (born 1986), Russian-born German singer-songwriter and musician
- Ananya, Indian actress
- Anari (born 1970), Spanish singer-songwriter
- Anarquia (born 1980), American professional wrestler
- Anasol (born 1976), Argentine-born Colombian pop singer
- Ancham (born 1998), Japanese professional wrestler
- Anda (born 1991), South Korean singer and songwriter
- Andra (born 1986), Romanian singer, songwriter and television personality
- Andrade (born 1989), Mexican wrestler
- Andrea (born 1987), Bulgarian pop-folk singer, songwriter and video director
- Andro (born 2001), Ukrainian-born Russian rapper
- Andy (born 1958), Iranian singer-songwriter and actor
- Aneka (born 1954), Scottish singer
- Anelia (born 1982), Bulgarian singer
- Anémone (1950–2019), French actress, filmmaker and political activist
- Anetra, American drag queen
- Ángel, Spanish singer
- Angel (born 1987), English singer-songwriter
- Angel (born 1992), Mexican wrestler
- Angela (born 1991), Ukrainian singer and model
- Angelababy (born 1989), Chinese model and actress
- Angélico (born 1987), South African professional wrestler
- Angelle (born 1979), British singer
- Angelyne (born 1958), American model
- Angese (1947–2008), Italian cartoonist
- Ängie (born 1995), Swedish singer
- Angie (born 2001), Italian singer-songwriter
- Ania (born 1981), Polish singer and composer
- Aníbal (1940–1994), Mexican professional wrestler
- Anike (born 1996), Nigerian-American hip hop artist
- Aniki (1969–2018), American model and pornographic film actor
- Anikv (born 1995), Russian singer and songwriter
- Animal (1960–2020), American wrestler
- Anitta (born 1993), Brazilian singer-songwriter, actress, dancer, and businesswoman
- Anly (born 1997), Japanese singer-songwriter
- Ann (born 1991), Taiwanese singer-songwriter
- Annabel (born 1984), Argentine–Japanese singer
- Annabella (1909–1996), French film actress
- Anna-Lisa (1933–2018), Norwegian actress
- Annapurna (born 1948), Indian actress
- Annie (born 1977), Norwegian singer and DJ
- Annupamaa (born 1968), Indian singer
- Anodajay (born 1977), Canadian rapper
- AnonymousCulture (born 1985), American rapper and songwriter
- Anoraak, French musician, multi instrumentalist, singer, producer and DJ
- Anoushka (born 1960), Egyptian singer
- Anquette (born 1972), American rapper
- Anri (born 1961), Japanese singer-songwriter
- Ansonbean (born 2000), Hong Kong singer and actor
- Ant (born 1967), American comedian and actor
- Ant (born 1970), American hip hop producer
- Antix, British–Jordanian hip hop artist
- Antoine (born 1944), French singer
- Antonino (born 1983), Italian singer
- Antonio (born 1973), British-Jamaican reggae singer
- Antwon (born 1986), American rapper
- Anuj, Indian-born Australian singer
- Aoi (born 2002), Japanese professional wrestler
- Aoora (born 1986), South Korean rapper, singer, songwriter and composer
- AP (born 1978), French rapper
- Apache (1964–2010), American rapper
- Apashe (born 1992), Belgian-born Canadian musician
- Apathy (born 1979), American rapper and producer
- Apex (1981–2017), British musician
- Aphrodite (born 1968), British DJ and producer
- Apocalipsis (born 1975), Mexican professional wrestler
- Apollo (born 1987), American wrestler
- Apollon (1862–1928), French wrestler
- Appa (born 1983), Dutch rapper
- Apparat (born 1978), German musician
- Applejaxx (born 1982), American Christian hip hop artist
- Aqualung (born 1972), English singer-songwriter
- Aquaria (born 1996), American drag queen, television personality and recording artist
- Aquiles, Brazilian wrestler
- Arabesque (born 1981), Canadian rapper
- Aramary, Japanese singer and voice actress
- Aramis, Mexican professional wrestler
- Arca (born 1989), Venezuelan musician and record producer
- Arcángel (born 1985), American-Puerto Rican singer-songwriter, rapper and actor
- Ares (born 1973), Norwegian singer and musician
- Ares (born 1980), Swiss professional wrestler
- Arévalo (1947–2024), Spanish comedian and actor
- Arez (born 1991), Mexican professional wrestler
- Argenis (born 1986), Mexican wrestler
- Arie (born 1985), South Korean singer
- Ariel (born 1981), Indonesian singer
- Ariete (born 2002), Italian singer–songwriter
- Aril (born 1985), Malaysian singer, actor, dancer and television host
- Arin (born 1999), South Korean singer and actress
- Arisa (born 1982), Italian singer
- Arivu, Indian composer, rapper, singer and songwriter
- Arivumathi, Indian lyricist
- Arkalis, Mexican professional wrestler
- Arkano (born 1994), Spanish freestyle musician and rapper
- Arleta (1945–2017), Greek musician, author and book illustrator
- Arletty (1898–1992), French model, singer and actress
- Armand (1946–2015), Dutch singer
- Armandinho (1891–1946), Portuguese fado guitarist and composer
- Armandinho (born 1953), Brazilian composer and singer
- Arin (born 1999), South Korean singer and actress
- Arno (1949–2022), Belgian singer
- Aron (born 1993), American media personality, singer and rapper
- Arrietty (born 1996), American drag performer
- Arrow (1949–2010), West Indian singer-songwriter
- Artik (born 1985), Ukrainian singer, director, producer and composer
- Arty (born 1989), Russian DJ and music producer
- ARTZ (born 1990), American rapper, songwriter and recording artist
- Aruray (1922–1988), Filipina actress
- Arya (born 1980), Kerala-born Indian actor
- Arz, British rapper and songwriter
- Asa (born 1980), Finnish rapper
- Aṣa (born 1982), Nigerian singer-songwriter
- Asahi (2002–2024), Japanese wrestler
- Asaka (born 1999), Japanese singer
- Asca (born 1996), Japanese singer and musician
- Asena (born 1977), Turkish belly dancer, choreographer, singer and television personality
- Aseul, South Korean electropop musician
- Ashe (born 1993), American singer and songwriter
- Asheru (born 1974), American rapper
- Ashin (born 1975), Taiwanese singer-songwriter
- Ashnikko (born 1996), American rapper, singer and songwriter
- Aska (born 1958), Japanese singer-songwriter
- Aslyn (born 1980), American singer-songwriter
- Asmahan (1912–1944), Syrian singer, actress
- Aspektz (born 1989), Canadian rapper and record producer
- Assol, former stage name of Swoiia (born 1993), Ukrainian singer
- Asspizza (born 1998), American fashion designer
- Aste (born 1985), Finnish rapper
- Astral (born 1989), Mexican professional wrestler
- Astro (born 1996), American rapper, producer and actor
- Astroman (born 1997), Japanese professional wrestler
- Astronautalis (born 1981), American alternative hip hop artist
- Asuka (born 1981), Japanese wrestler
- Asuquomo (born 1993), Nigerian-Canadian rapper, singer and visual artist
- Asya (born 1965), Turkish singer-songwriter
- ATB (born 1973), German DJ and producer
- Ateed, German singer
- Athena (born 1988), American professional wrestler
- Atlanta (born 1981), Lithuanian pop singer
- Atlantis (born 1962), Mexican wrestler
- ATMA (born 1979), Romanian composer, performer and electronic music producer
- Atumpan (born 1983), Ghanaian afrobeats and dancehall singer
- Aube (1959–2013), Japanese noise musician
- Audaz (born 1997), Mexican professional wrestler
- Audien (born 1992), American DJ and electronic music producer
- Ava (born 1996), Italian record producer, DJ and beatmaker
- Ava (born 2001), American professional wrestler
- Averno (born 1977), Mexican wrestler
- Avi (born 1937), American children's and young adult author
- Avicii (1989–2018), Swedish EDM DJ, remixer and record producer
- Avril (born 1986), Kenyan singer, songwriter and actress
- AVS (1957–2013), Indian actor, comedian, producer and director
- Awich (born 1986), Japanese rapper
- Awie (born 1968), Malaysian singer, actor
- Awkwafina (born 1989), American actress, rapper
- Ax (born 1947), American professional wrestler
- Axiom, French rapper
- Axiom (born 1997), Spanish professional wrestler
- Axwell (born 1977), Swedish DJ and record producer
- Ayana, Japanese singer-songwriter
- Ayane, Japanese singer
- Ayase (born 1994), Japanese musician, record producer
- Ayesem (born 1986), Ghanaian hip hop and hiplife recording artist
- Ayliva (born 1998), German singer and musician
- Ayọ (born 1980), German singer-songwriter
- AZ (born 1972), American rapper
- Azana (born 2000), South African singer and songwriter
- Azet (born 1993), Albanian-born German rapper
- Azis (born 1978), Bulgarian singer
- AZM (born 2002), Japanese professional wrestler
- Azteck (born 1983), English musician
- Azu (born 1981), Japanese singer
- Azuquita (1946–2022), Panamanian singer and composer

== B ==
- Baauer (born 1989), American record producer
- Baaziz (more detailed article in French) (born c. 1963), Algerian-born Berber singer
- Babalu (1942–1998), Filipino actor and comedian
- BabiBoi (born 1999), American rapper
- Baby, Indian film director, producer, actor and scriptwriter
- BabyChiefDoit, American rapper
- Babydaddy (born 1976), American musician
- Babyface (born 1958), American musician
- BabyJake (born 1997), American singer, songwriter and rapper
- Babylon (born 1988), South Korean singer-songwriter, rapper and dancer
- Babymorocco (born 1994), English singer, record producer and performance artist
- BabyTron (born 2000), American rapper
- Bacchelli (born 1952), Spanish singer
- Bach (1882–1953), French actor, singer and music hall performer
- Backxwash (born 1991), Zambian-Canadian rapper and producer
- Bada (born 1980), South Korean singer
- Baddiewinkle (1928–2025), American model and Internet personality
- Badri, Indian film director and screenwriter
- Badshah (born 1984), Indian rapper
- Baekho (born 1995), South Korean singer-songwriter, record producer and musical theatre actor
- Baekhyun (born 1992), South Korean singer and actor
- Bahadoor (1930–2000), Indian comedian
- Bahamadia (born 1966), American hip hop artist, DJ and emcee
- Bahamas (born 1981), Canadian musician
- Bahiano (born 1962), Argentine reggae singer
- Baitaca (born 1965), Brazilian singer and songwriter
- Bakar (born 1994), English singer
- Bakarhythm (born 1975), Japanese comedian, narrator, actor and lyricist
- Bakermat (born 1991), Dutch DJ and music producer
- Bala (born 1966), Tamil film director, screenwriter and producer
- Baloji (born 1978), Belgian rapper and film director
- Baltimora (born 2001), Italian singer-songwriter and record producer
- Balvaz (born 1970), Norwegian musician
- BamBam (born 1997), Thai rapper and singer
- Bambi (born 2003), Polish rapper and songwriter
- Bamboo, Kenyan rapper
- Bambu, Filipino-American rapper
- Banachek (born 1960), English mentalist, magician and thought reader
- Bandido (born 1995), Mexican professional wrestler
- Bandmanrill, American rapper and songwriter
- Bandokay (born 2001), British rapper
- Bangkay (1947–2018), Filipino actor
- Bangs (born 1990), South Sudanese-born Australian rapper
- Banks (born 1988), American singer and songwriter
- Banksie, British drag performer
- Bapu (1933–2014), Indian film director
- Baracuda (born 1983), Canadian rapper
- Barbara (1930–1997), French singer
- Barbette (1899–1973), American performer and trapeze artist
- Bardhi (born 1997), Albanian rapper
- Barkaa (born 1995), Australian rapper and musician
- Baro (born 1992), South Korean actor, rapper, singer and lyricist
- Baron (born 1948), Trinidadian singer and songwriter
- Barzin, Canadian singer-songwriter
- Bas (born 1987), Sudanese-American rapper
- Bashy (born 1985), British hip hop artist
- Basia (born 1954), Polish singer-songwriter and record producer
- Basick (born 1986), South Korean rapper
- Basim (born 1992), Danish singer
- Bassagong (born 1986), South Korean rapper
- Basshunter (born 1984), Swedish singer-songwriter and producer
- Bassilyo (born 1977), Filipino rapper, singer and songwriter
- Bassima (born 1973), Lebanese singer
- Bassnectar (born 1978), American DJ and electronic music producer
- Basta (born 1980), Russian rapper, producer and radio host
- Basto (born 1975), Belgian record producer, musician and DJ
- Batatinha (born 1957), Portuguese clown
- Baths (born 1989), American electronic musician
- Batista (born 1969), American wrestler
- Battlecat (born 1968), American hip hop producer
- Bausa (born 1989), German rapper and singer
- Bayianteras (1903–1985), Greek singer and composer
- Bayley (born 1989), American wrestler
- BbyMutha (born 1989), American rapper
- beabadoobee (born 2000), Filipino-British indie singer-songwriter
- Beam (born 1995), Jamaican-born American rapper, singer, songwriter and record producer
- Beans (born 1971), American hip hop artist and producer
- BeatKing (1984–2024), American rapper, songwriter and record producer
- Beatrich (born 1988), Lithuanian singer and songwriter
- Beauregarde (born 1936), American wrestler and musician
- Beaver (1951–2010), New Zealand singer
- Bebe (born 1978), Spanish singer and actress
- Becca (born 1989), American singer-songwriter and guitarist
- Beck (born 1970), American musician
- Becky (born 1984), Japanese entertainer
- Bedders (born 1961), English musician, songwriter and composer
- Bedoes (born 1998), Polish rapper and songwriter
- Beedie (born 1988), American rapper
- Beef (born 1989), American rapper, singer, record producer and songwriter
- Beefy (born 1985), American rapper and webcomic artist
- Beéle (born 2002), Colombian singer
- Beenzino (born 1987), South Korean rapper
- Belladonna (born 1981), American pornographic actress
- Bellah, British singer, songwriter and actress
- Belle (born 2004), American singer-songwriter
- Belly (born 1984), Canadian rapper
- BélO (born 1979), Haitian singer-songwriter and musician
- Ben (born 1981), German singer-songwriter, occasional voice actor and TV host
- Ben (born 1991), South Korean singer
- Bénabar (born 1969), French singer-songwriter
- Benash (born 1994), French rapper
- Bender (1980–2018), Canadian underground hip hop artist
- Benee (born 2000), New Zealand singer
- Bengala, Mexican professional wrestler
- Benjah (born 1983), American songwriter and producer
- Bentot (1928–1986), Filipino comedian
- Benzino (born 1965), American hip hop artist, media executive and record producer
- Bergen (1958–1989), Turkish singer
- Berner (born 1983), American rapper
- Berri (born 1974), English singer
- Bess (born 1993), Finnish singer
- Beth (born 1981), Spanish singer and actress
- Beth (born 1997), Canadian drag performer
- Beto (1967–2010), Portuguese singer
- Betzaida (born 1981), American singer
- Bewhy (born 1993), South Korean rapper
- Beytocan (1955–2023), Kurdish singer and musician
- Bez (born 1964), English percussionist, dancer, media personality and comedian
- Bharathiraja (1942–2026), Indian film director, producer, screenwriter and actor
- Bhavana (born 1986), Indian actress
- Bhavatharini (born 1976), Indian singer and music director
- Bia (born 1991), American rapper and singer
- Bianka (born 1985), Belarusian singer, songwriter and rapper
- Bibi (born 1998), South Korean singer, rapper, songwriter and actress
- Bibie (born 1957), Ghanaian singer
- Biel (born 1996), Brazilian singer
- Bigidagoe (1997–2024), Dutch rapper
- BigMama (born 2000), Italian rapper and songwriter
- Bigman (born 1999), South Korean beatboxer, singer-songwriter, composer and producer
- BigTril (born 1990), Ugandan rapper, producer and songwriter
- BigXthaPlug (born 1998), American rapper
- Bii (born 1989), South Korean-born Taiwanese singer, songwriter and actor
- Bilal (born 1983), Lebanese singer
- Bino (1953–2010), Italian pop singer
- Biquardus, French composer
- Bird (born 1975), Japanese singer
- Birdapres, Canadian rapper
- Birdman (born 1969), American rapper
- Birdy (born 1996), English singer and songwriter
- Birdz, Australian rapper, songwriter and record producer
- Bismil (born 1994), Indian singer and songwriter
- Biyouna (1952–2025), Algerian singer, dancer and actress
- Bizarrap (born 1998), Argentine DJ and record producer
- Bizarre (born 1976), American hip hop artist
- Bizniz (born 1982), South Korean rapper and singer
- Bizzey (born 1985), Dutch hip hop performer and DJ
- Bizzle (born 1983), American Christian hip hop recording artist
- Bizzy (born 1980), South Korea-based rapper
- BJ, Puerto Rican professional wrestler
- BK (born 1977), English hard house producer
- Bktherula (born 2002), American rapper and singer
- Blaaze (born 1975), Indian rap artist and singer
- Black (1962–2016), British singer-songwriter
- Blackbear (born 1990), American musician, singer-songwriter and record producer
- Blackhaine, English experimental musician, rapper and choreographer
- Blackie (born 1987), American rapper, songwriter, record producer and musician
- Blackmagic, Nigerian rapper, singer and songwriter
- Blacko (born 1979), French singer and hip hop artist
- Bladee (born 1994), Swedish rapper
- Blakdyak (1969–2016), Filipino actor, comedian and reggae singer
- Blanche (born 1999), Belgian singer
- Blanco (born 1999), British rapper and singer
- Blanco (born 2003), Italian singer, rapper and songwriter
- Blanke (born 1991), Australian electronic music producer and DJ
- Blaqbonez (born 1996), Nigerian rapper
- Blaqstarr (born 1985), American rapper, singer, producer and DJ
- Blasphemer (born 1975), Norwegian musician
- Blaudzun (born 1974), Dutch singer-songwriter
- Blaya (born 1987), Brazilian-born Portuguese singer and dancer
- Blerando (born 1999), Kosovo-Albanian singer, songwriter and rapper
- Blessd (born 2000), Colombian singer-songwriter and rapper
- Bleubird, American rap artist
- Bligg (born 1976), Swiss rapper
- Blind (born 2000), Italian rapper
- Blinky (born 1944), American singer
- Bloo (born 1994), South Korean based rapper
- BloodPop (born 1990), American musician, record producer and songwriter
- Blowfly (1945–2016), American singer-songwriter, comedian and rapper
- Blu (born 1983), American rapper
- Bludnymph (born 1998), Canadian singer
- Blueface (born 1997), American rapper
- Blueprint (born 1974), American rapper and hip hop producer
- Blumio (born 1985), Japanese-German rapper
- Blxckie (born 1999), South African rapper, singer, songwriter and record producer
- Blxst (born 1992), American rapper, singer, songwriter and record producer
- BM (born 1992), American-South Korean rapper, songwriter and composer
- BM (born 1992), Congolese-born British singer-songwriter, dancer, director and record producer
- Bnxn (born 1997), Nigerian singer, songwriter and record producer
- BoA (born 1986), South Korean pop singer
- Boa (born 1995), Chinese wrestler
- Bobbito (born 1967), American DJ and member of the Rock Steady Crew
- Bobby (born 1988), Bangladeshi film actress and producer
- Bobby (born 1995), South Korean rapper, singer and songwriter
- Bobina (born 1982), Russian trance DJ, record producer and radio host
- Bobita (born 1953), Bangladeshi film actress
- Bocafloja (born 1978), Mexican MC and spoken word artist
- Boef (born 1993), Dutch-speaking rapper and vlogger of Algerian-French nationality
- Bogle (1964–2005), Jamaican dancehall dancer and choreographer
- Bohemia (born 1979), Pakistani-American rapper, singer, songwriter and record producer
- BOJ (born 1994), English-Nigerian singer, songwriter and record producer
- Bojoura (born 1947), Dutch singer
- Bolémvn (born 1996), French rapper
- Bombae, Indian-Canadian drag performer
- Bombolo (1931–1987), Italian actor and comedian
- Bona (born 1995), South Korean singer and actress
- Bones (stylized as BONES; born 1994), American rapper
- Bones (born 1999), English drag queen
- Bonga (born 1942), Angolan singer and songwriter
- Bono (born 1960), Irish singer-songwriter
- Bonobo (born 1976), English musician, producer and DJ
- Bonvi (1941–1995), Italian comic book artist
- Booba (born 1976), French rapper
- Boobay (born 1986), Filipino actor, comedian and host
- Boogat, Canadian-Mexican musician
- Boogie (born 1996), Chinese rapper, dancer and singer
- Boom (born 1982), South Korean rapper, singer, actor, radio host and television presenter
- Boondox (born 1975), American rapper
- Borgeous, American DJ and producer
- Borgore (born 1987), Israeli producer and DJ
- Boris (born 1965), French singer-songwriter
- Borlet, French composer
- Bosco (born 1993), American drag performer
- Bosh, French rapper
- Boslen (born 1999), Canadian rapper
- Boss (1969–2024), American rapper
- Bossman (born 1984), American rapper
- Bosson (born 1969), Swedish singer-songwriter
- Botzy (born 1986), American rapper
- Bou, Algerian-British musician
- Bouqui (born 1979), Nigerian-American rapper, singer and songwriter
- Bourvil (1917–1970), French actor and singer
- Bowzer (born 1947), American singer
- Boyfriend (born 1988), American singer, songwriter, producer, rapper and performance artist
- Brädi (born 1979), Finnish hip hop artist
- Bradshaw (born 1966), American wrestler and businessman
- Braguinha (1907–2006), Brazilian songwriter and singer
- Braille (born 1981), American hip hop recording artist
- Brain (born 1963), American rock drummer
- Brainpower (born 1975), Belgium-born Dutch rapper
- Braintax (born 1973), British hip hop artist and producer
- Brakence (born 2001), American singer-songwriter, rapper, record producer and musician
- Bramsito (born 1996), French singer, songwriter and producer of R&B music
- Brando, American singer and songwriter
- Brasco, French rapper
- Brassaï (1899–1984), Hungarian photographer and filmmaker
- Breakage (born 1982), British electronic producer and DJ
- Breakbot (born 1981), French producer and DJ
- Breeze, American rapper
- Bresh (born 1996), Italian singer, songwriter and rapper
- Breskvica (born 2001), Serbian singer
- Bricktop (1894–1984), American dancer, jazz singer and vaudevillian
- Briga (born 1989), Italian singer-songwriter and rapper
- Bigidagoe (1997–2024), Dutch drill rapper
- Brigiding, Filipino drag performer
- Brisco (born 1983), American rapper
- Broery (1944–2000), Indonesian singer
- Brokenteeth (born 1999), South Korean shoegaze musician
- Brolle (born 1981), Swedish singer and musician
- Bronco (born 1989), Mexican professional wrestler
- Brooks (born 1995), Dutch disc jockey, record producer and electronic musician
- Brunette (born 2001), Armenian singer-songwriter
- Brutus (born 1983), Dutch rapper
- Bruza, British grime MC and rapper
- Brye, American singer, songwriter and producer
- Brytiago (born 1992), Puerto Rican singer and songwriter
- BT (born 1971), American musician, DJ, singer, songwriter, record producer, composer and audio engineer
- Bubblegum (born 1984), British professional wrestler
- Buckethead (born 1969), American musician
- Buckshot (born 1974), American rapper
- Buddy (born 1993), American rapper, singer, dancer and actor
- Budgie (born 1957), English drummer
- Budo, American musician, multi-instrumentalist and record producer
- Bugo (born 1973), Italian singer-songwriter and actor
- Bukkcity (born 1980), Australian-born American rapper
- Bumkey (born 1984), South Korean R&B singer
- Bumpy, Australian singer, songwriter and producer
- Bumzu (born 1991), South Korean singer, songwriter and record producer
- Burial, British electronic musician
- Busdriver (born 1978), American rapper
- Bushi (born 1983), Japanese professional wrestler
- Bushido (born 1978), German rapper
- Bushwalla, American singer, songwriter and rapper
- Bussunda (1962–2006), Brazilian TV comedian
- Buta (born 1995), Kosovo-Albanian rapper
- Butterscotch (born 1985), American singer and pianist
- Buzy (1957–2023), French singer
- ByLwansta (born 1995), South African rapper, record producer, art director and graphic designer
- Byul (born 1983), South Korean singer
- Byz (born 1984), Swedish hip hop musician

== C ==
- Cabum (born 1985), Ghanaian highlife musician
- Cachao (1918–2008), Cuban double bassist and composer
- Cacophony (born 1994), South Korean musician
- Cadet (1990–2019), British rapper
- Café (born 1949), Brazilian percussionist, singer, composer and music producer
- Cage (born 1973), American rapper
- Calbo (1973–2026), French-Congolese rapper
- Calboy (born 1999), American rapper, singer and songwriter
- Cali (born 1968), French singer-songwriter
- Calogero (born 1971), French singer
- Caloncho (born 1986), Mexican musician and singer
- Calpurnio (1927–2022), Spanish comic artist and illustrator
- Cam (born 1984), American singer
- Camaleón (born 1979), Mexican professional wrestler
- Camané (born 1966), Portuguese singer
- Camelia (1929–1950), Egyptian actress
- Camelia (born 1974), Malaysian singer and model
- Camellia (born 1992), Japanese electronic musician, producer and DJ
- Cameron (born 1987), American professional wrestler, singer, model and dancer
- Camoflauge (1981–2003), American rapper
- Campino (born 1962), German-British singer
- Cam'ron (born 1976), American rapper
- Canardo (born 1984), French rapper, singer, songwriter and music producer
- Canblaster, French DJ and producer
- Cancerbero (born 1977), Mexican wrestler
- Candyman (born 1968), American rapper and record producer
- Canibus (born 1974), Jamaican-born American rapper
- Canon (born 1989), American Christian rapper
- Canserbero (1988–2015), Venezuelan rapper and composer
- Cantinflas (1911–1993), Mexican comedian and actor
- Canuplin (1904–1979), Filipino actor and comedian
- Caparezza (born 1973), Italian rapper
- Capasta, Ghanaian musician, songwriter, rapper and performer
- Capicua (born 1982), Portuguese rapper
- Capo (born 1991), German rapper
- Capone (born 1976), American rapper
- Cappadonna (born 1968), American rapper
- Capucine (1928–1990), French actress
- Capulina (1927–2011), Mexican comedy actor
- Caravelli (born 1930), French orchestra leader, composer and arranger
- Cardo (born 1984), American record producer and rapper
- Carequinha (1915–2006), Brazilian clown and actor
- Caribou (born 1978), Canadian musician
- Carlito (born 1979), Puerto Rican professional wrestler
- Carlos (1943–2008), French entertainer
- Carlprit (born 1986), Zimbabwean rapper and actor
- Carman (1956–2021), American singer, rapper, songwriter, TV host and evangelist
- Carmella (born 1987), American cheerleader, dancer, fitness trainer, model and professional wrestler
- Carmencita (1868–1910), Spanish-American dancer
- Carminho (born 1984), Portuguese singer
- Carpentras (1470–1548), French composer
- CarryMinati (born 1999), Indian YouTuber, streamer and rapper
- Cartola (1908–1980), Brazilian singer and composer
- Casadilego (born 2003), Italian singer
- Casanova (born 1986), Haitian-American rapper
- Cascarita (1920–1975), Cuban singer
- Cashis (born 1978), American rapper
- Casisdead, British rap and grime MC, record producer and music video director
- Caspa (born 1982), English music producer
- Casper (born 1982), German-American rapper
- Cassandro (born 1970), American-born Mexican wrestler
- Cassiano (1943–2021), Brazilian singer-songwriter and guitarist
- Cassidy (born 1982), American rapper
- Cassie (born 1986), American singer
- Castro (1982–2014), Ghanaian hiplife recording artist and musician
- Casual (born 1973), American rapper and producer
- Catrina (born 1986), American actress, model and professional wrestler
- Caushun (born 1977), American rapper
- Cavetown (born 1998), English singer-songwriter, record producer and YouTuber
- Cayouche (1949–2024), Canadian singer-songwriter
- Cazuza (1958–1990), Brazilian singer and composer
- Cazwell (born 1979), American rapper and songwriter
- Cazzu (born 1993), Argentine rapper and singer
- CDQ (born 1985), Nigerian rapper, singer and songwriter
- Ceca (born 1973), Serbian singer
- Cecilia, Norwegian singer
- Cecilia (born 1943), Chilean singer-songwriter
- Cecilia (1948–1976), Spanish singer-songwriter
- Ceg (born 1993), Turkish rapper, singer and songwriter
- Celeda, American singer and drag performer
- Cellski (born 1975), American rapper and record producer
- Ceo (born 1981), Swedish singer-songwriter and guitarist
- Cepillín (1946–2021), Mexican television clown
- Cesaro (born 1980), Swiss wrestler
- Ceschi (born 1981), American hip hop musician
- Cesqeaux (born 1993), Dutch record producer and DJ
- Céu (born 1980), Brazilian singer-songwriter
- Ceui, Japanese singer-songwriter
- Ceza (born 1976), Turkish rapper
- Chabelo (1935–2023), Mexican actor, comedian, TV presenter and singer
- Chacrinha (1917–1988), Brazilian TV host and comedian
- Chakri (1974–2014), Indian music director and singer
- Chakuza (born 1981), Austrian rapper
- Chalam (1929–1989), Indian actor, comedian and director
- Chalice (born 1983), Estonian singer and rapper
- Challenger (1959–2010), Bangladeshi actor
- Cham (born 1977), Jamaican DJ, singer-songwriter and record producer
- Chameleone (born 1979), Ugandan DJ and AfroBeat artiste and musician reggae
- Chamillionaire (born 1979), American rapper
- Champignon (1978–2013), Brazilian singer-songwriter, lyricist, bassist, beatboxer and drummer
- Champtown (born 1973), American rapper, disc jockey and film director
- Chamuel (born 1993), Mexican professional wrestler
- Chancellor (born 1986), American singer-songwriter and record producer
- Chandol (born 2002), American singer, musician and internet personality
- Changjo (born 1995), South Korean singer, songwriter and actor
- Changuito (1948–2025), Cuban percussionist
- Chanmina (born 1998), South Korean-Japanese rapper and pop musician
- Chanty (born 2002), Filipino singer and actress
- Chara (born 1968), Japanese singer, songwriter, musician and actress
- Charizma (1973–1993), American MC
- Charle (born 1960), Indian actor
- Charlee (born 1993), Austrian electropop singer
- Charlie (born 1947), Hungarian singer
- charlieonnafriday (born 2003), American rapper and singer-songwriter
- Charlotte (born 1986), American wrestler
- Charmaine, Zimbabwean-Canadian rapper
- Charmion (1875–1949), American vaudeville trapeze artist and strongwoman
- Charo (born 1951), Spanish-American entertainer
- Chata (born 1979), Japanese singer
- Chaundon (born 1976), American hip-hop artist
- Chayanne (born 1968), Puerto Rican singer
- Che (born 2006), American rapper, singer, songwriter and producer
- Checkmate, Canadian rapper
- Cheek (born 1981), Finnish rapper
- Cheetah (born 1990), South Korean rapper
- Chelo, American singer, rapper and choreographer
- Chelo (born 1944), Mexican singer, songwriter and actress
- Chen (born 1992), South Korean singer
- Che'Nelle (born 1982), Australian singer-songwriter
- Chenoa (born 1975), Argentine-Spanish singer
- Cherie (born 1984), French singer
- Cherrelle (born 1958), American singer
- Cherry (born 1974), Japanese professional wrestler
- Cheryl (born 1993), English drag queen
- Chespirito (1929–2014), Mexican actor and comedian
- Chessman (born 1975), Mexican wrestler
- Chetes (born 1979), Mexican rock musician
- Chezidek (born 1973), Jamaican singer
- Chiamamifaro (born 2001), Italian singer-songwriter
- Chicane (born 1971), British musician, composer and producer
- Chicháy (1918–1993), Filipino comedian
- Chilli (born 1971), American dancer, singer-songwriter, actress and television personality
- Chillinit (born 1993), Australian rapper and musician
- Chimbala (born 1989), Dominican rapper and singer
- Chinchilla (born 1996), British singer and rapper
- Chingy (born 1980), American hip-hop artist
- Chinx (1983–2015), American rapper
- Chip (born 1990), English rapper and singer-songwriter
- Chiquitita (born 1998), American drag performance artist
- Chiquito (1932–1997), Filipino actor
- Chiranjeevi (born 1955), Indian actor
- Chisu (born 1982), Finnish singer-songwriter and producer
- Chitragupta (1917–1991), Indian composer
- Chitrasena (1921–2005), Sri Lankan dancer
- Cho (born 1993), Dutch rapper
- Choclair (born 1975), Canadian rapper
- Chocolat (born 1978), Japanese singer
- Choice, American rapper
- Choiza (born 1980), South Korean hip hop recording artist
- Choker (born 1995), American singer-songwriter, rapper and record producer
- Chokeules, Canadian underground hip hop artist
- Chokoleit (1972–2019), Filipino comedian
- Choppa, American rapper
- Chorão (1970–2013), Brazilian musician, singer, poet
- ChouCho, Japanese singer
- Chouchou (1939–1975), Lebanese comedian, stage actor, director
- Chrispa (born 1982), Greek singer
- Christian (1943–2025), Italian singer
- Christian (born 1973), Canadian professional wrestler
- Christophe (born 1945), French singer-songwriter
- Chrisye (1949–2007), Indonesian singer
- Chronik (born 1981), English grime MC
- Chrystian (1956–2024), Brazilian singer
- Chuckie (born 1978), Surinamese DJ and producer
- Chunja (born 1976), South Korean singer
- Chunkz (born 1996), British YouTuber, host, entertainer and musician
- Chuu (born 1999), South Korean singer, dancer and television personality
- Chuuwee (born 1990), American hip hop artist
- Chyna (1970–2016), American professional wrestler
- Chyskillz (1969–2018), American record producer, DJ, musician and rapper
- Cibernético (born 1975), Mexican wrestler
- Cicciolina (born 1951), Hungarian-Italian porn star, politician and singer
- Cici (born 1987), South African singer-songwriter and actress
- Ciguli (1957–2014), Bulgarian singer and accordionist
- Cilvaringz (born 1979), Dutch rapper and hip hop producer
- Cima (born 1977), Japanese professional wrestler
- Cineplexx (born 1973), Argentine musician
- Circus, American rapper
- Cirkut (born 1986), Canadian record producer and songwriter
- CJ (born 1997), American rapper
- CKay (born 1995), Nigerian singer
- CL (born 1991), South Korean rapper and singer
- Clairette (1919–2008), French-Canadian actress and singer
- Clairo (born 1998), American singer-songwriter
- Clairville (1811–1879), French comedian and chansonnier
- Classified (born 1978), Canadian rapper
- Clau (born 1996), Brazilian singer and songwriter
- Claudisabel (1976–2022), Portuguese singer
- Cláudya (born 1948), Brazilian singer
- Clavish (born 1998), British rapper
- Cledos (born 1998), Finnish rapper
- Clémentine (born 1963), French singer-songwriter
- Clementine (born 1976), Filipino singer-songwriter and music producer
- Clementino (born 1982), Italian rapper
- Cléo (born 1946), French singer
- Cleo (born 1983), Polish singer
- Cleo (born 1987), Swedish rap artist, singer and songwriter
- Cleo. (born 1988), English rapper and musician
- Clorofila (1965–2024), Mexican musician, producer and composer
- Cloud (born 1983), American dancer, director and choreographer
- Clueso (born 1980), German singer-songwriter, rapper and producer
- Cmqmartina (born 1999), Italian singer-songwriter
- C-Murder (born 1971), American rapper and songwriter
- CNU (born 1991), South Korean singer and actor
- Coba (born 1959), Japanese musician
- Cobarde (1947–1983), Mexican professional wrestler
- Cobrah (born 1996), Swedish rapper, singer, songwriter and record producer
- Coby (born 1985), Serbian rapper, singer, songwriter and record producer
- Cocco (born 1977), Japanese singer
- Cochise (born 1998), American rapper, singer and record producer
- Coez (born 1983), Italian singer and rapper
- Coko (born 1970), American singer
- Colde (born 1994), South Korean singer-songwriter
- Colet (born 2001), Filipino singer and dancer
- Colleen (born 1976), French ambient/experimental musician/composer
- Coluche (1944–1986), French comedian and actor
- Comethazine (born 1998), American rapper and songwriter
- Common (born 1972), American rapper and actor
- Conceit, American rapper
- Conceited, American battle rapper
- Conchita (born 1980), Finnish-born Spanish singer
- Conejo (born 1974), American rapper
- Consequence (born 1977), American rapper
- Contra (born 1989), Turkish rapper, singer and songwriter
- Coogie (born 1994), South Korean rapper and songwriter
- Coolio (1963–2022), American rapper
- Coppé (born 1967), Japanese singer-songwriter and music producer
- Copywrite (born 1978), American underground hip hop artist
- Corazon, Filipino drag performer and make-up artist
- Cormega (born 1970), American emcee rapper
- Corneille (born 1977), Canadian Rwandan singer
- Cornelius (born 1969), Japanese musician and producer
- Costa-Gavras (born 1933), Greek-French film director, screenwriter and producer
- Costinha (1923–1995), Brazilian comedian and actor
- Coti (born 1973), Argentine singer, songwriter and musician
- Cougnut (1968–2001), American rapper
- Cozz, American rapper
- Crankdat (born 1997), American DJ and electronic dance music producer
- Crayon (born 2000), Nigerian singer and songwriter
- Crea (born 2000), Japanese professional wrestler
- Cream, South Korean rapper and producer
- Creature (born 1973), American rapper, vocalist and composer
- Cricket (born 2000), Kosovo-Albanian record producer
- Criolo (born 1975), Brazilian singer and rapper
- Cristie (born 1978), Spanish singer-songwriter
- Cristina (1959–2020), American singer
- Cro (born 1990), German rapper, singer and producer
- Cronos (born 1963), English heavy metal singer and bass guitarist
- Crowbar (born 1974), American wrestler
- Crush (born 1992), South Korean singer-songwriter and record producer
- Crystal (born 1985), Canadian-British drag performer, TV host and personality
- Csézy (born 1979), Hungarian singer
- Culture, Canadian rapper, reggae and hip hop artist
- Cupcakke (born 1997), American rapper
- Cupid (born 1979), American singer and songwriter
- Currensy (born 1981), American rapper
- Curse (born 1978), German hip hop artist
- Curtismith (born 1993), Filipino singer, rapper and songwriter
- CYGO (born 1998), Belarusian rapper and songwriter
- Cytherea (born 1981), American pornographic actress and model

== D ==
- DaBaby (born 1991), American rapper
- Dabo (born 1975), Japanese rapper
- Daboy (1952–2008), Filipino actor and producer
- Daboyway (born 1981), American-born Thai rapper, songwriter, producer and actor
- Dabzee (born 1991), Indian rapper and songwriter
- Daddae (1964–2024), English guitarist, percussionist and keyboardist
- Dado, Canadian street performer, magician and clown
- Dadoo (born 1974), French rapper
- Daedelus (born 1977), American record producer
- Daffney (1975–2021), American wrestler
- Daga (born 1988), Mexican professional wrestler
- Dagmar (1921–2001), American actress, model and TV personality
- DaHeala (born 1982), Canadian record producer and songwriter
- Dahli (born 1991), American musician, drag performer and entertainer
- Dajim (born 1977), Thai hip-hop artist
- Daklon (born 1944), Israeli singer
- Dakota, British singer
- Dalchong (born 1991), South Korean singer
- Dalex (born 1990), American singer
- Dalia, Egyptian singer
- Dalida (1933–1987), Italo-French Egyptian-born singer and actress, diva
- Dalilah (1936–2001), Spanish belly dancer
- Damae (born 1979), German model, television presenter and singer-songwriter
- Damia (1889–1978), French singer and actress
- Damso (born 1992), Belgian-Congolese rapper, singer and songwriter
- Dana (born 1951), Irish singer
- Dana (born 1986), South Korean singer, dancer and pianist
- Danarto (1941–2018), Indonesian writer and artist
- Dan-e-o (born 1977), Canadian hip hop artist and actor
- D'Angelo (1974–2025), American singer
- Danger (born 1984), French electronic musician
- Dani (1944–2022), French actress and singer
- Đani (born 1973), Serbian singer
- Daniel (born 1955), Montenegro-born singer
- Daniel (born 1968), Brazilian singer
- DaniLeigh (born 1994), American singer and songwriter
- Danja (born 1982), American record producer
- Dannic (born 1985), Dutch DJ and producer
- Danny (born 1942), Finnish singer
- Danny! (born 1983), American rapper and producer
- Danzel (born 1976), Belgian singer and musician
- Daoko (born 1997), Japanese singer and rapper
- Daphni (born 1978), Canadian musician
- Dappy (born 1987), English-born Greek rapper, singer and actor
- Dara (born 1984), South Korean singer and actress
- Dara (born 1998), Bulgarian pop singer
- Darassa (born 1988), Tanzanian hip hop artist
- Darell (born 1990), Puerto Rican rapper and songwriter
- Dareysteel (born 1975), Nigerian-born Spanish rapper, singer-songwriter and record producer
- Darine (born 1984), Lebanese-born Swedish singer-songwriter
- Darkiel (born 1994), Puerto Rican reggaeton artist and actor
- Darpan (1928–1980), Pakistani actor
- Darshan (born 1977), Indian actor and film producer
- Darude (born 1975), Finnish trance producer and DJ
- Dataz (born 1984), Tanzanian rapper
- Datin (born 1985), American Christian hip hop musician
- Datsik (born 1988), Canadian DJ and music producer
- Daubray (1837–1892), French actor and operetta singer
- Daughtry (born 1979), American singer and musician
- Dave (born 1944), Dutch-born French singer
- Dave (born 1998), British rapper and actor
- Davido (born 1992), American-born Nigerian singer, songwriter and record producer
- Dawn (born 1994), South Korean rapper and singer-songwriter
- Dawn (born 1998), American drag performer
- Dax (born 1994), Canadian rapper, singer and songwriter
- Daya (born 1998), American singer-songwriter
- Dazastah, Australian MC
- DDG (born 1997), American YouTuber and rapper
- Dead (1969–1991), Swedish vocalist
- Deadlee, American rapper
- Deadmau5 (born 1981), Canadian record producer, DJ, musician and composer
- Deakin (born 1978), American singer and musician
- Dean (born 1992), South Korean singer, rapper and record producer
- Debbi (born 1993), German-Czech singer
- Debbie (born 1954), Dutch singer
- DeDeLicious, British drag performer
- Dee, Canadian singer-songwriter, DJ, musician and producer
- Deeba (born 1947), Pakistani actress
- Deedar (born 1980), Pakistani actress
- Deemi (born 1980), American singer-songwriter and producer
- Deen (born 1982), Bosnia and Herzegovina singer
- Deep (d.2014), American rapper
- Deepflow (born 1984), South Korean rapper and music producer
- Deetah (born 1976), Chilean rapper and singer
- Deevani (born 1975), Dominican Republic reggaeton singer
- Deezle, American record producer, rapper and singer
- Defconn (born 1977), South Korean rapper, comedian and MC
- Dekumzy (born 1983), Nigerian record producer, musician, composer, pianist and songwriter
- Delilah (born 1991), English singer-songwriter
- Delirious (born 1980), American wrestler
- Delkash (1924–2004), Iranian singer and actress
- Delta, Australian professional wrestler
- Delta (born 1985), Mexican wrestler
- Demarco (born 1982), Jamaican recording artist
- Demrick, American rapper
- Demy (born 1991), Greek singer
- Denali (born 1992), American drag performer, figure skater and choreographer
- Dendemann (born 1974), German rapper
- Dengaz (born 1984), Portuguese rapper and hip-hop musician
- Denim, Canadian drag performer
- Denyo (born 1977), German hip hop artist
- Deorro (born 1991), Mexican-American DJ
- Deraj (born 1987), American Christian hip hop musician
- Desdamona (born 1973), American hip-hop and spoken word artist
- Desiigner (born 1997), American rapper, singer and songwriter
- Desingerica (born 1993), Serbian rapper
- Désiré (1823–1873), French baritone, who created many comic roles for Offenbach
- Desire (born 1973), American professional wrestler
- Desireless (born 1952), French singer
- Despot (born 1982), American hip hop artist
- Des'ree (born 1968), British singer
- Dessa (born 1974), Filipino singer
- Dessa (born 1981), American rapper and singer
- Detox (born 1985), American drag performer and recording artist
- Detsl (1983–2019), Russian rapper
- Deuce (born 1971), Fijian-born American professional wrestler
- Deuce (born 1983), American rapper, music producer and guitarist
- Dev (born 1982), Indian actor
- Dev (born 1989), American singer
- Deva (1950–2026), Indian composer and singer
- Devika (1943–2002), Indian actress
- Devito (born 1995), Serbian rapper
- Devon (born 1977), American pornographic actress
- Dewiq (born 1975), Indonesian singer and songwriter
- Dexter (born 1973), Brazilian rapper
- D-Flame (born 1971), German hip hop and reggae musician
- Dhanush (born 1983), Indian actor and singer
- Dhany (born 1972), Italian singer-songwriter
- Dharani, Indian film director and screenwriter
- Dharius (born 1984), Mexican rapper
- Dharshana (born 1984), Indian singer
- Dhee (born 1998), Australian singer
- Dia (born 1992), South Korean singer
- Diabolic (born 1978), American rapper
- Diamante (born 1991), Cuban-American professional wrestler
- Diamante (born 1992), Mexican professional wrestler
- Diamond (born 1988), American rapper
- Diamond (born 1996), Mexican professional wrestler
- Diamondog (born 1980), Angolan rapper and documentary filmmaker
- Diana (1948–2024), Brazilian singer
- Dice (born 1970), American rapper
- Dicte (born 1966), Danish musician and songwriter
- Diesel (born 1959), American actor and wrestler
- DigDat (born 1999), British rapper
- DijahSB, Canadian rapper
- Dilba (born 1971), Turkish-born Swedish singer-songwriter of Kurdish origin
- Dileep (born 1968), Indian actor and producer
- Dilip (c. 1955–2012), Indian actor
- DillanPonders (born 1991), Canadian rapper
- Dillom (born 2000), Argentine rapper
- Dilsinho (born 1992), Brazilian singer-songwriter
- Dimal (born 1986), Russian-Ukrainian rapper, songwriter and entertainer
- Dina (born 1956), Portuguese singer
- Dina (born 1985), Norwegian singer
- Dinardi (1911–1996), German magician
- Dinastía (born 1994), Mexican professional wrestler
- DinDin (born 1991), South Korean rapper, producer, television personality and radio personality
- Dinho (1971–1996), Brazilian singer, songwriter and comedian
- Dino (born 1948), Italian singer and actor
- Dino (born 1963), American DJ, singer-songwriter and record producer
- Dino (born 1999), South Korean singer, dancer and rapper
- Dinos (born 1993), French rapper
- DIOR (born 1999), Malaysian singer-songwriter, record producer and content creator
- Diplo (born 1978), American DJ, producer and songwriter
- Disasterpeace (born 1986), American composer and musician
- Disiz (born 1978), French rapper and actor
- Disturbio (born 1979), Mexican professional wrestler
- Ditonellapiaga (born 1997), Italian singer-songwriter
- Diverse, American rapper
- Divine (1945–1988), American actor, singer and drag queen
- Divine (born 1990), Indian rapper
- Divino (born 1977), Puerto Rican reggaeton artist
- Djo (born 1992), American singer and actor
- Djonga (born 1994), Brazilian rapper and composer
- DK (born 1997), South Korean singer
- DLow (born 1995), American hip-hop dancer, rapper and choreographer
- DMC (born 1964), American rapper
- DMX (1970–2021), American rapper and actor
- Dntel, electronic music artist
- Do (born 1981), Dutch singer
- Dobby, Filipino-Aboriginal Australian musician
- Dobie, British alternative hip hop musician and producer
- Doda (born 1984), Polish singer
- dodie (born 1995), British singer-songwriter
- Doechii (born 1998), American rapper and singer
- Dolcenera (born 1977), Italian singer-songwriter
- Dolla (1987–2009), American rapper
- Dollarman, Grenada-born singer, songwriter, producer and musician
- Dolores (1893–1975), English model
- Dolores (1894–1934), English model
- Dolphin (born 1971), Russian musical artist, singer, songwriter and rapper
- Dolphy (1928–2012), Filipino actor and comedian
- Dominguinhos (1941–2013), Brazilian singer and composer
- Domino (born 1970), American record producer and DJ
- Domino (born 1972), American rapper
- Dominot (1930–2014), Italian actor and female impersonator
- Donatello (born 1947), Italian singer
- Donga (1890–1974), Brazilian guitarist and composer
- Donghae (born 1986), South Korean singer and occasional actor
- Doni (born 1967), Bulgarian pop singer, composer and actor
- Donnie (born 1994), Dutch rapper and songwriter
- Donnis (born 1984), American rapper
- DoNormaal, American rapper and actress
- Dopebwoy (born 1994), Dutch rapper
- Doraldina (1888–1936), American dancer and actress
- Dorismar (born 1975), Argentine model, actress, TV hostess and singer
- Doro (born 1964), German singer-songwriter
- Dorothée (born 1953), French singer and TV presenter
- Doseone (born 1977), American emcee, artist and poet
- Doughbeezy (born 1986), American rapper
- Doveman (born 1981), American musician
- Doyoung (born 1996), South Korean singer, actor and host
- Double (born 1975), Japanese singer
- Doudrop (born 1991), Scottish wrestler
- Douki (born 1991), Japanese professional wrestler
- DQ (born 1973), Danish singer and drag queen
- Drake (born 1986), Canadian rapper and singer
- Drago (born 1975), Mexican professional wrestler
- Dralístico (born 1991), Mexican professional wrestler
- DRAM (born 1988), American rapper
- Drama (born 1981), American rapper
- Dranem (1869–1935), French singer and actor
- Drapht (born 1982), Australian hip hop artist
- Drastik (born 1989), American Hip-Hop artist
- Dream (born 1999), American YouTuber, Twitch streamer and singer
- DreamDoll (born 1992), American rapper
- Dreezy (born 1994), American rapper, singer and songwriter
- Dregen (born 1973), Swedish musician
- Dremo, Nigerian songwriter, singer, record producer, recording artist and stage performer
- Dres (born 1967), American rapper
- Dresta (born 1971), American rapper
- Drezus (born 1982), Canadian rapper
- DripReport, American music producer and singer
- Drmngnow, Australian rapper, dancer and actor
- Droideka (born 1994), British record producer and electronic music producer
- Droz (1969–2023), American wrestler
- Dru, Canadian singer-songwriter
- Drupi (born 1947), Italian pop-rock singer
- Dry (born 1977), French rapper of Congolese origin
- D-Train (born 1962), American musician
- DTTX (1969–2016), American rapper
- Dubee, American rapper
- Dubfire (born 1971), Iranian-American DJ and producer
- Dubzy, English grime MC and actor
- Duckwrth (born 1989), American rapper, singer and songwriter
- Dugazon (1746–1809), French actor
- Duke, English singer-songwriter and producer
- DukeDaGod (born 1977), American rapper and record producer
- Duki (born 1996), Argentine rapper and singer
- Dulce (1955–2024), Mexican singer and actress
- Dulce (born 1961), Filipina singer
- Dumbfoundead (born 1986), Argentine-born American rapper
- Dunga (born 1964), Brazilian singer, songwriter, radio broadcaster and television presenter
- Duquende (born 1965), Spanish singer
- Durella, Nigerian recording artist, performer and songwriter
- Dutch (born 1987), American professional wrestler
- Dutchavelli (born 1993), British rapper
- DVLP (born 1978), American record producer, songwriter and disc jockey
- Dvwn (born 1994), South Korean singer-songwriter
- Dwagie, Taiwanese rapper
- Dwarakish (1942–2024), Indian actor, director and producer
- Dwele (born 1978), American singer-songwriter and record producer
- Dwta (born 2001), Filipino singer and songwriter
- DY (born 1984), Canadian rapper
- Dyango (born 1940), Spanish musician
- DyE, French musician
- Dylan (born 1999), English musician, singer and songwriter
- Dynamo (born 1982), British magician
- Dynoro (born 1999), Lithuanian DJ and music producer
- Dyo, English singer-songwriter
- Dyro (born 1992), Dutch DJ and EDM producer
- DyspOra, South Sudanese-born Australian rapper
- Dzham (born 1986), Russian musician
- Dziarma (born 1997), Polish singer

== E ==
- E (born 1963), American lead singer, songwriter, guitarist, keyboardist and drummer
- Eaeon (born 1975), South Korean musician
- Eartheater (born 1989), American singer, songwriter, multi-instrumentalist and producer
- Earthquake (born 1963), American actor and comedian
- Earthquake (1963–2006), Canadian sumōtori and professional wrestler
- Eazzy (born 1986), Ghanaian singer, rapper and songwriter
- Eben (born 1979), Nigerian gospel singer, vocalist and songwriter
- Ebi (born 1949), Iranian singer
- Ecid, American hip hop recording artist and record producer
- Eddie (born 1947), American retired singer and songwriter
- Eden (born 1988), South Korean singer-songwriter and record producer
- Eden (born 1995), Irish musician, singer, songwriter, record producer and model
- Edge (born 1973), Canadian professional wrestler, podcaster and actor
- Edoheart, Nigerian dancer, singer, musician, producer and performance artist
- Eekwol, Canadian rapper
- Efe (born 1993), Nigerian singer, media personality, songwriter and rapper
- Effy (born 1990), American professional wrestler
- Efya (born 1987), Ghanaian singer, songwriter and actress
- Eilera, French singer-songwriter and guitarist
- Egardus, Flemish composer
- Egreen (born 1984), Italian rapper
- Ektor (born 1980), Puerto Rican singer and actor
- EL (born 1989), Ghanaian Afrobeats musician, rapper, singer and producer
- Elaheh (1934–2007), Iranian singer
- Elai (born 1999), Albanian rapper, producer and songwriter
- Elastinen (born 1981), Finnish rap musician
- eLDee (born 1977), Nigerian-American rapper and producer
- Elderbrook (born 1992), English electronic musician and DJ
- Eldzhey (born 1994), Russian rapper and songwriter
- Elecktra, Swedish drag performer
- Electrico (born 1986), Mexican wrestler
- Electro (born 1997), Puerto Rican professional wrestler
- Electrosexual (born 1980), French electronic musician, composer, performer, record producer and music video director
- Electroshock (born 1970), Mexican wrestler
- Elektra (born 1970), American retired professional wrestling valet and professional wrestler
- Elephante (born 1989), American musician, DJ and music producer
- ElGrandeToto (born 1996), Moroccan rapper
- ELHAE (born 1990), American singer and songwriter
- Elias (born 1987), American wrestler and musician
- Eligh, American emcee, songwriter and record producer
- Elio, Welsh-Canadian singer, songwriter and producer
- Elio (born 1961), Italian singer and musician
- Elips, French drag performer
- Elisa (born 1989), Japanese singer and model
- Elissa (born 1972), Lebanese singer
- Elite (born 1983), American hip-hop and R&B record producer and recording artist
- EliZe (born 1982), Dutch singer
- Elkie (born 1998), Hong Kong singer and actress
- Ella (born 1966), Malaysian singer
- Ellekappa (born 1955), Italian cartoonist
- Elliphant (born 1985), Swedish singer, rapper and songwriter
- Elly (born 1987), Japanese dancer and rapper
- Elly (born 1991), South Korean rapper, songwriter and composer
- Elmer (born 1995), Dutch rapper, musician, producer and actor
- Elo (born 1991), South Korean singer
- El-P (born 1975), American rapper, songwriter and record producer
- Elseeta (1883–1903), American dancer
- Elton (born 1971), German television presenter and comedian
- Elucid, American rapper and record producer
- Elyanna (born 2002), Palestinian singer and songwriter
- eLZhi (born 1978), American rapper
- Emaa (born 1992), Romanian singer and songwriter
- Emade (born 1981), Polish hip hop producer
- Emanuela (born 1981), Bulgarian singer
- Emay (born 1991), Canadian rapper and record producer
- Emicida (born 1985), Brazilian rapper and songwriter
- Emii (born 1984), American actress, pop recording artist and martial artist
- Emilia (born 1978), Ethiopian-Swedish singer
- Eminem (born 1972), American rapper, songwriter, record producer, record executive and actor
- Emkej, Slovenian rapper
- Emma (born 1989), Australian wrestler
- Emmanuel (born 1955), Mexican singer
- Emmanuëlle (1942–2024), Canadian singer
- Emme (born 1963), American plus-size supermodel
- Emmi, British-Australian singer-songwriter
- Emmi (born 1979), Finnish singer-songwriter
- Emmy (born 1984), Armenian singer
- Emtee (born 1992), South African rapper
- Emyli (born 1988), Japanese singer
- Enako (born 1994), Japanese professional cosplayer, voice actress and singer
- Enchanting (1997–2024), American rapper and singer-songwriter
- Encore (born 1974), German singer
- Enigma (born 1988), Italian rapper
- Enji (born 1991), Mongolian singer and songwriter
- Eno (born 1998), German rapper
- Ensi (born 1985), Italian rapper
- Envy (born 1987), English rapper and MC
- EO (born 2001), British rapper, singer, songwriter and YouTuber
- Eon (1954–2009), British producer
- Epaksa (born 1954), South Korean singer
- Ephesto (born 1965), Mexican wrestler
- Epiphany (born 1981), American professional wrestler
- Erakah, New Zealand singer
- Ercandize (born 1978), German rapper
- Ericdoa (born 2002), American singer, songwriter and record producer
- Erigga (born 1987), Nigerian singer and rapper
- Erik, British singer
- Erik (born 1984), American wrestler
- Ernia (born 1993), Italian rapper
- Eru (born 1983), American singer, musician and composer, based in South Korea
- Escoria (born 1980), Mexican professional wrestler
- EsDeeKid, British rapper
- Esfinge (born 1993), Mexican professional wrestler
- Eskeerdo, Cuban-American rapper and songwriter
- Espantito (1968–2020), Mexican professional wrestler
- Espectrito (1966–2016), Mexican professional wrestler
- Espíritu (born 1975), Mexican professional wrestler
- Esquerita (1935–1986), American singer
- Esteban (born 1947 or 1948), American classical guitarist
- Estéfano (born 1966), Colombian musician, singer-songwriter and record producer
- Esthero (born 1978), Canadian singer-songwriter
- Estrellita (born 1977), Mexican professional wrestler
- Esui (born 1985), Mongolian professional wrestler
- Etana (born 1984), Jamaican singer
- Eternia (born 1980), Canadian rapper
- Eterno (born 1990), Mexican professional wrestler
- Ethereal (born 1989), American rapper and record producer
- Étienne (born 1971), Canadian singer
- Euforia (born 1974), Mexican wrestler
- Eugene (born 1975), American wrestler and promoter
- Eugene (born 1981), South Korean singer and actress
- Eugy (born 1988), Ghanaian-British singer, rapper and songwriter
- Eunha (born 1997), South Korean singer
- Eunhyuk (born 1986), South Korean entertainer
- Euro (born 1992), Dominican-American rapper
- Euronymous (1968–1993), Norwegian guitarist
- Evanion (c.1832–1905), English conjurer, ventriloquist and humorist
- Eve (born 1995), Japanese singer-songwriter
- Everlast (born 1969), American rapper, singer and songwriter
- Evidence (born 1976), American hip hop artist and producer
- Evil (born 1987), Japanese professional wrestler
- Evilgiane (born 1997), American record producer and songwriter
- Evinha (born 1951), Brazilian singer
- Example (born 1982), British rapper
- Excalibur (born 1980), American wrestler
- Exile (born 1977), American hip hop DJ, producer and rapper
- Excision (born 1986), Canadian producer and EDM DJ
- Extince (born 1967), Dutch rapper
- Exy (born 1995), South Korean rapper, singer, songwriter and actress
- Eyedea (1981–2010), American rapper
- Eyenine (born 1985), American hip hop recording artist
- Eypio (born 1983), Turkish rapper, songwriter and musician
- Ezhel (born 1991), Turkish rapper and singer
- Ezhil (born 1964), Indian film director
- Ezinma (born 1991), American violinist, model music educator and film composer
- Ezkimo (1980–2015), Finnish hip-hop musician
- E-40 (born 1967), American rapper

== F ==
- Faarooq (born 1958), American footballer and wrestler
- Fababy (born 1988), French rapper, singer and songwriter
- Fabe (born 1971), French rapper
- Fabio (born 1965), British disc jockey and record producer
- Fabo (born 1983), American rapper and producer
- Fabolous (born 1977), American rapper
- Face (born 1997), Russian rapper
- Fairuz, sometimes Feyrouz or Fayrouz (born 1934 or 1935), Lebanese singer
- Fakemink (born 2005), English rapper and producer
- Falco (1957–1998), Austrian singer, songwriter and rapper
- Falete (born 1978), Spanish singer
- Fallulah (born 1985), Danish singer-songwriter
- Falu, Indian-born American singer-songwriter
- Falz (born 1990), Nigerian rapper, songwriter and actor
- Fameye (born 1994), Ghanaian rapper and musician
- Fam-Lay (born 1974), American rapper
- Famous, Canadian rapper and radio broadcaster
- Fanchon (1668–1743), French operatic soprano and celebrated beauty
- Fancy (born 1946), German singer
- Fandango (born 1983), American professional wrestler
- Fanfulla (1913–1971), Italian actor and comedian
- Fantasia (born 1972), American professional wrestler
- Fantasio (1936–2017), Argentine magician
- Fantasy (born 1989), Mexican professional wrestler
- Farooque (1948–2023), Bangladeshi actor
- Farruko (born 1993), Puerto Rican reggaeton singer-songwriter
- Fashawn (born 1988), American rapper
- Fasma (born 1996), Italian singer-songwriter and rapper
- Father (born 1990), American rapper, songwriter and record producer
- Fatlip (born 1969), American hip hop musician
- Fave (born 2000), Nigerian singer-songwriter and recording artist
- Favorite (born 1986), German rapper
- Fawni (born 1985), Austrian singer-songwriter and actress
- Faylan (born 1982), Japanese singer
- Fayo (1977–2024), Canadian musician
- Fayray (born 1976), Japanese singer-songwriter
- Faze, Nigerian musician and actor
- Fazer (born 1987), British rapper, singer, songwriter, record producer and DJ
- Feadz, French music producer, DJ and songwriter
- Fedez (born 1989), Italian rapper, singer and songwriter
- Feduk (born 1992), Russian singer, hip hop, house rap singer and songwriter
- Féfé (born 1976), French singer and rapper
- Fei (born 1987), Chinese singer and actress
- Feid (born 1992), Colombian singer and songwriter
- Feis (1986–2019), Dutch rapper
- Feiticeira (born 1976), Brazilian model and TV personality
- Fejo, Indian rapper and songwriter
- Feloni (born 1977), American rapper
- Fénix (born 1990), Mexican wrestler
- Fenriz (born 1971), Norwegian musician and songwriter
- Ferdinand (1791–1837), French ballet dancer
- Fergie (born 1975), American singer-songwriter
- Fern (born 1979), Puerto Rican rapper
- Fernandel (1903–1971), French actor and singer
- Fernanfloo (born 1993), Salvadoran YouTuber
- Fero (born 1997), Kosovo-Albanian rapper, singer and songwriter
- Ferréz (born 1975), Brazilian rapper
- Ferron (born 1952), Canadian singer-songwriter
- Ferrugem (born 1988), Brazilian singer and composer
- Fey (born 1973), Mexican singer
- Feyrouz (1943–2016), Egyptian film child actress
- Fianso (born 1986), French rapper
- Fieldy (born 1969), American bass guitar player
- Fiend (born 1976), American rapper
- Fifi (born 1994), Kosovo-Albanian singer and songwriter
- Figgkidd, Australian rapper
- Figure, American electronic music producer and DJ
- Fiki (born 1995), Bulgarian singer
- Fimiguerrero (born 2001), British-Nigerian rapper
- Finch (born 1990), German rapper, Twitch streamer, YouTuber and battle rapper
- Fink (born 1972), English singer, songwriter, guitarist, producer and disc jockey
- Fire (born 1973), Mexican professional wrestler
- Fish (born 1958), Scottish singer-songwriter and occasional actor
- Fishman (1951–2017), Mexican professional wrestler
- Fisz (born 1978), Polish rap artist
- Fiuk (born 1990), Brazilian singer-songwriter and actor
- Flabba (1977–2015), South African hip-hop musician
- Flakiss (born 1988), American rapper and actress
- Flame (born 1981), American Lutheran Christian hip hop rapper
- Flamita (born 1994), Mexican professional wrestler
- Flavour (born 1983), Nigerian singer
- Flea (born 1962), Australian-born American musician
- Fler (born 1982), German rapper
- Flex (born 1980), Panamanian reggaeton artist
- Flexclusive (born 1986), Ghanaian-born singer, rapper and producer
- Flo (born 1947), American singer, musician and songwriter
- Flohio, Nigerian-born British rapper
- Flor, Guatemalan-New Zealand drag performer
- Flor (born 1984), Argentine singer
- Florence (1749–1816), French actor
- Florrie (born 1988), English pop singer-songwriter, drummer and model
- Flosstradamus, American DJ and musician
- Flow, American rapper, songwriter and record producer
- Flowdan (born 1980), English grime MC and record producer
- Flowsik (born 1985), South Korean–American rapper and singer
- Flume (born 1991), Australian record producer, musician and DJ
- Flyer (born 1994), Mexican professional wrestler
- F'Murr (aka F'Murrr; 1946–2018), French cartoonist and comic book writer
- Focalistic (born 1996), South African rapper
- Foogiano (born 1993), American rapper
- Forastero (born 1994), Mexican professional wrestler
- Foreknown (born 1979), American Christian hip hop rapper
- Fosforito (1932–2025), Spanish singer
- FouKi, Canadian rapper
- Foxes (born 1989), British singer, songwriter and actress
- Foxx (born 1984), American rapper
- Franchino (1953–2024), Italian disc jockey
- Franglish (born 1994), French rapper and singer
- Frankee (born 1983), American singer
- Frankenstein, Canadian rapper and record producer
- Frankmusik (born 1985), English electropop musician, singer
- Frauenarzt (born 1978), German rapper
- Frederik (born 1945), Finnish singer
- Fredi (1942–2021), Finnish comedic actor, musician, singer-songwriter and television presenter
- Fredo (born 1994), British rapper and singer
- Fredokiss (born 1986), Malawian rapper and songwriter
- Fredwreck (born 1972), American producer
- Free (born 1968), American rapper, singer and TV personality
- Freebo (born 1944), American bassist, tubist, guitarist, singer-songwriter and producer
- Freek (born 1990), Somali rapper, singer, music director and record producer
- Freeman (born 1951), Finnish singer, songwriter and musician
- Freeman (born 1972), Algerian-born French hip hop artist, actor and dancer
- Freeway (born 1978), American rapper
- Fréhel (1891–1951), French singer and actress (aka Pervenche)
- Frenchie (born 1985), American rapper
- Frenkie (born 1982), Bosnian rapper
- Friction, English drum and bass producer and DJ
- Fridayy (born 2000), Haitian-American singer, songwriter and record producer
- Frisco (born 1982), British grime MC, songwriter and record producer
- Frightmare (born 1990), American professional wrestler
- Friyie (born 1994), Canadian singer, songwriter and rapper
- Froid (born 1993), Brazilian rapper
- Frost (born 1962), American rapper, songwriter and record producer
- Froz (born 1985), Russian-Italian dancer
- FTampa (born 1987), Brazilian DJ and record producer
- Fuego (born 1981), American singer-songwriter
- Fuego (born 1981), Mexican wrestler
- Fugative (born 1994), British hip hop and grime artist
- Fugaz (born 1996), Mexican professional wrestler
- Fuma (born 1986), Japanese professional wrestler
- Funkerman (born 1975), Dutch house DJ, record producer and remixer
- Funktasztikus, Hungarian MC and rapper
- Funky (born 1974), Puerto Rican rapper and songwriter
- FuntCase (born 1986), English dubstep and drum and bass producer and DJ
- Fura (born 1991), Indian rapper, music producer and singer
- Future (born 1983), American rapper, singer and producer
- Futuristic (born 1991), American rapper, singer and songwriter
- Futuro, Mexican professional wrestler
- Fuzati (born 1978), French rapper
- Fyang (born 2006), Filipino model and actress
- Fyütch (born 1988), American rapper, singer, songwriter and record producer

== G ==
- Gaab (born 1998), Brazilian singer and composer
- Gaahl (born 1975), Norwegian singer
- Gabbriette (born 1997), American model and musician
- Gaboro (2000–2024), Swedish rapper and songwriter
- Gabrielle (born 1969), English singer
- Gaby (born 1965), Panamanian singer and rapper
- Gackt (born 1973), Japanese musician, songwriter and actor
- Gaddar (1949–2023), Indian singer and lyricist
- Gaeko (born 1981), South Korean rapper
- Gaho (born 1997), South Korean singer, songwriter and producer
- Gajala (born 1985), Indian actress
- Galder (born 1976), Norwegian composer, musician and singer
- Gambi (born 1998), French rapper and hip hop artist
- GAMBO (born 1995), Ghanaian rapper, songwriter and singer
- Game (born 1979), American rapper
- Gamma (born 1973), Japanese professional wrestler
- Gammer (born 1985), English music producer and DJ
- Gangrel (born 1969), American professional wrestler
- Garbo (born 1958), Italian singer-songwriter and record producer
- Garoto (1915–1955), Brazilian composer, musician and singer
- Garou (born 1972), Canadian singer
- Gary (born 1978), South Korean rapper, songwriter, record producer and television personality
- Gasmilla (born 1984), Ghanaian Hiplife artist
- GaTa (born 1987), American rapper and actor
- Gaudi (born 1963), Anglo-Italian musician and record producer
- Gauge (born 1980), American pornographic actress and former stripper
- Gawdland, Thai drag performer
- Gawvi (born 1988), American Christian hip hop artist and music producer
- Gazapizm (born 1988), Turkish rapper and singer
- Gazebo (born 1960), Italian singer and musician
- Gazo (born 1994), French rapper
- Gazza (born 1977), Namibian musician
- Gazzo (born 1960), British street magician
- GDP, American hip hop recording artist
- G-Eazy (born 1989), American rapper
- Gedo (born 1969), Japanese professional wrestler
- GeeGun (born 1985), Russian rap singer
- Geko (born 1997), British rapper and singer
- Gemitaiz (born 1988), Italian rapper
- Genevieve (1920–2004), American comedian, actress and singer
- Genie, American drag performer
- Genka (born 1974), Estonian rapper, record producer and actor
- Gentleman (born 1974), German reggae musician
- Geolier (born 2000), Italian rapper
- Georgius (1891–1970), French singer, author, writer, playwright and actor
- Gepe (born 1981), Chilean singer-songwriter and multi-instrumentalist
- Geraldo (1904–1974), British bandleader
- Gesaffelstein (born 1987), French music programmer, DJ, songwriter and record producer
- Getter (born 1993), American DJ and producer
- Gettomasa (born 1993), Canadian-born Finnish rapper
- Ghali (born 1993), Italian rapper of Tunisian origin
- Ghastly (born 1989), American DJ and record producer
- Ghemon (born 1982), Italian rapper and singer-songwriter
- Ghettosocks, Canadian hip hop artist
- Ghetts (born 1984), English grime artist
- Ghogha (born 1989), Iranian rapper, lyricist, singer and visual artist
- Ghost, Scottish record producer
- Ghost (born 1974), Jamaican singjay performer
- Ghostemane (born 1991), American singer, songwriter, rapper and musician
- Ghostly (born 1997), English grime MC and producer
- Giggs (born 1981), British rapper
- Gigi (born 1974), Ethiopian singer
- Gilbert (born 1976), Puerto Rican professional wrestler
- Gilda (born 1950), Italian singer
- Gilda (1961–1996), Argentine singer-songwriter
- Gill (born 1977), South Korean singer and television personality
- Gilla (born 1950), Austrian singer
- Gille (born 1987), Japanese singer
- Gilli (born 1992), Danish rapper and actor
- Gilme (born 1983), South Korean singer
- Gimma, Swiss rapper
- Gims (born 1986), Congolese-French singer, rapper and songwriter
- Ginger (born 1964), English guitarist and singer-songwriter
- Gingzilla, Australian drag performer
- Ginuwine (born 1970), American singer, songwriter, dancer and actor
- Gio (born 1990), Spanish singer, actor, songwriter and producer
- Giriboy (born 1991), South Korean rapper and singer
- Girli (born 1997), English singer and songwriter
- Giselle (born 2000), Japanese-South Korean singer and rapper
- Giulia (born 1994), English-born Italian-Japanese professional wrestler
- Giulietta (born 1992), Australian singer, songwriter, dancer, rapper and model
- Giveon (born 1995), American singer
- Gizzle (born 1987), American rapper and songwriter
- GJan (born 1995), Lithuanian singer and songwriter
- Gkay (born 1992), Brazilian actress and media personality
- Glaive (born 2005), American singer-songwriter and record producer
- GLC (born 1977), American rapper
- Glints (born 1993), Flemish musician
- Gloc-9 (born 1977), Filipino rapper
- Gloria (born 1973), Bulgarian singer
- GloRilla (born 1999), American rapper
- Glory, Puerto Rican singer
- Glukoza (born 1986), Russian singer
- GMK, Nigerian record producer, sound engineer, rapper, singer and songwriter
- Gnash (born 1993), American musician, rapper, singer, songwriter, DJ and record producer
- Gnawi (born 1988), Moroccan rapper
- Godsilla (born 1984), German rapper
- Go-Jo (born 1995), Australian singer and songwriter
- Goldie (born 1965), English musician, DJ, visual artist and actor
- GoldLink (born 1993), American rapper
- Goldroom, American electronic musician
- Goldust (born 1969), American professional wrestler
- Goldy (born 1969), American rapper
- Gombloh (1948–1988), Indonesian singer and songwriter
- Gongchan (born 1993), South Korean singer and actor
- Gonjasufi (born 1978), American vocalist, producer and disc jockey
- Gonzaguinha (1945–1991), Brazilian singer and composer
- Gonzales (born 1972), Canadian musician
- Googoosh (born 1950), Iranian singer and actress
- Goonew (1997–2022), American rapper
- GoonRock (born 1975), American record producer, musician, singer, songwriter and rapper
- Gopika (born 1984), Indian actress
- Gordo (born 1991), Nicaraguan-American record producer and DJ
- Gorgeous (born 1975), Japanese comedian
- Gori (born 1972), Japanese comedian
- Gottmik (born 1996), American drag performer and make-up artist
- Gotye (born 1980), Belgium-born Australian multi-instrumentalist and singer-songwriter
- Goundamani (born 1939), Indian film actor and comedian
- Governor (born 1983), American singer
- Govinda (born 1963), Indian actor
- GQ (born 1976), American actor and rapper
- Grabbitz (born 1993), American electronic music producer, musician, composer and DJ
- Graciela (1915–2010), Cuban singer
- Grades, English producer, songwriter and DJ
- Grado (born 1988), Scottish professional wrestler and actor
- Gradur (born 1990), French-Congolese rapper
- Grafh (born 1982), American rapper
- Grandson (born 1993), American-Canadian singer, songwriter and rapper
- Gravity (born 1997), Mexican professional wrestler
- Gray (born 1986), South Korean rapper and record producer
- Gree (born 1998), South Korean rapper, singer, actor and television personality
- Greekazo (born 2001), Swedish rapper
- Grelo (born 1997), Brazilian singer-songwriter
- Grems (born 1978), French rapper and producer
- Gretchen (born 1959), Brazilian singer
- Gribouille (1941–1968), French singer
- Grieves (born 1984), American hip hop artist
- Griff (born 2001), English singer and songwriter
- Grimace, French composer
- Grimes (born 1988), Canadian musician and singer-songwriter
- Gringe (born 1980), French rapper and songwriter
- Griot, Swiss rapper
- Gripsta, American rapper
- Griz (born 1990), American DJ, songwriter and electronic music producer
- Grock (1880–1959), Swiss clown, composer and musician
- Grooverider (born 1967), British DJ
- Groundislava, American electronic musician and music producer
- Grše (born 1995), Croatian rapper
- Gru (1973–2019), Serbian rapper, musician and DJ
- Gryffin (born 1987), American musician, DJ and music producer
- Guanchulo (born 1987), Chilean professional wrestler
- Guante (born 1983), American hip hop recording artist
- Guapito (born 1981), Mexican professional wrestler
- Guaynaa (born 1992), Puerto Rican rapper and singer
- Guè (born 1980), Italian rapper, songwriter and record producer
- Guilda (1924–2012), French-Canadian drag queen
- GuiltyBeatz (born 1990), Ghanaian DJ and record producer
- Guinga (born 1950), Brazilian composer and musician
- Guitarricadelafuente (born 1997), Spanish singer-songwriter, guitarist and actor
- Gulam (c.1860–1901), Indian wrestler
- Gulddreng (born 1994), Danish musician
- Gulzar (born 1934), Indian poet, lyricist, author, screenwriter and film director
- Gummy (born 1981), South Korean singer
- Gun (born 1994), South Korean rapper
- Gunna (born 1993), American rapper, singer and songwriter
- Guinneissik, South Korean Electronic musician
- Gunplay (born 1979), American rapper
- Günther (born 1967), Swedish singer
- Gunther (born 1987), Austrian wrestler
- Guru (1966–2010), American rapper
- Guru (born 1987), Ghanaian rapper
- Gustaph (born 1980), Belgian singer-songwriter
- Gwamba (born 1990), Malawi rapper
- GZA (born 1966), American rapper and songwriter
- Gzuz (born 1988), German rapper, singer, songwriter and record producer

== H ==
- H (born 1976), Welsh singer, dancer and stage actor
- Habibitch, Franco-Algerian dancer
- Haco, Japanese singer, composer, multi-instrumentalist and sound artist
- Hades (born 1985), Polish rapper
- Haechan (born 2000), South Korean singer
- Haftbefehl (born 1985), German rapper
- Haha (born 1979), South Korean entertainer
- Haiducii (born 1977), Romanian musician, songwriter, model and actress
- Hakim (born 1962), Egyptian singer
- Hakimakli (born 1985), French DJ
- Haku (born 1959), Tongan professional wrestler
- Halca, Japanese musician
- Haliene (born 1988), American singer
- Halloween (born 1971), Mexican wrestler
- Hallowicked (born 1981), American wrestler
- Halna (born 1980), Japanese singer
- Halsey (born 1994), American singer-songwriter
- Halston (1932–1990), American fashion designer
- Hamoir, French ballet dancer and theatre director
- Hanan (born 2004), Japanese professional wrestler
- Hangama (born 1950), Afghan singer
- Hangzoo (born 1986), South Korean rapper
- Hani (born 1992), South Korean singer and entertainer
- Hannah (born 1978), Australian singer-songwriter and musician
- Hardwell (born 1988), Dutch DJ and music producer
- Harikumar (1956–2024), Indian screenwriter and film director
- Hariprriya (born 1991), Indian actress and model
- Harisu (born 1975), South Korean transsexual/transgender singer, model and actress
- Harmonize (born 1994), Tanzanian singer-songwriter
- Harper (1979–2020), American wrestler
- Harpo (born 1950), Swedish singer, musician and actor
- Haspop (born 1977), French stage director, choreographer and dancer
- Hatik (born 1992), French rapper and actor
- Havoc (born 1974), American rapper and record producer
- Hawk (1957–2003), American wrestler
- Hayabusa (1968–2016), Japanese professional wrestler
- Hayden (born 1971), Canadian singer-songwriter
- Hayedeh (1942–1990), Iranian singer of Persian classical and pop music
- Hayki (born 1983), Turkish rapper and songwriter
- Haystak (born 1973), American rapper
- Haytana (born 1979), Ukrainian singer-songwriter
- Headhunterz (born 1985), Dutch DJ, music producer and voice actor
- Headliner (born 1967), American rapper and DJ
- Heath (1968–2023), Japanese musician and singer-songwriter
- Hebro (born 1987), American rapper, singer, songwriter and record producer
- Hechicero, Mexican professional wrestler
- Hector (born 1974), Finnish singer-songwriter
- Heems (born 1985), American rapper
- Hef (born 1987), Dutch rapper
- Heino (born 1938), German singer
- Heize (born 1991), South Korean singer-songwriter, rapper, composer and producer
- Heklina (1967–2023), American actor, drag queen and entrepreneur
- Helluva (born 1977), American record producer, rapper, singer and songwriter
- Hemlata (born 1954), Indian playback singer
- Henare (born 1992), Māori professional wrestler
- Hennedub (born 1994), Danish-American music producer
- H.E.R. (born 1997), American singer
- Hercules (1956–2004), American professional wrestler
- Hergé (1907–1983), Belgian comics writer and artist
- Hero (born 1986), South Korean entertainer
- Herobust (born 1987), American music producer and DJ
- Hervé (1825–1892), French singer, composer and conductor
- Hibiscus (1949–1982), American actor and performance artist
- Hichkas (born 1985), Iranian rap artist
- hide (1964–1998), Japanese musician
- Hido (1969–2021), Japanese professional wrestler
- Highlyy (born 2003), British singer and songwriter
- Highsnob (born 1985), Italian rapper and singer
- Hikuleo (born 1991), American professional wrestler
- Himeka (born 1981), Canadian singer
- Hina (born 2006), Japanese professional wrestler
- Hind (born 1979), Bahraini singer
- Hiroshi (born 1972), Japanese comedian
- Histeria (born 1969), Mexican wrestler
- Hitmaka (born 1985), American record producer and rapper
- Hizaki (stylized as HIZAKI; born 1979), Japanese musician
- Hodgy (born 1990), American rapper
- Holden (born 2000), Italian singer-songwriter and record producer
- Holidead (born 1986), American professional wrestler
- Holland (born 1996), South Korean singer
- Holly (born 1995), Portuguese DJ and music producer
- Hollywood (born 1963), American professional wrestler, actress, model and stuntwoman
- Homayun (1937–2025), Iranian actor
- Homer (1920–1971), American musician
- Homicide (born 1977), American wrestler
- HOMIE (born 1989), Belarusian singer, songwriter, rap and hip hop artist
- Honcho (born 1995), Filipino rapper, singer and songwriter
- Honoka (born 1982), Japanese actress, pornographic actress and TV personality
- Hoody (born 1990), South Korean singer-songwriter
- Hook (born 1999), American professional wrestler
- Hooligan (born 1972), Mexican wrestler
- Hooligan (born 1980), Maltese rapper
- Hopie, American rapper
- Hopsin (born 1985), American rapper, songwriter and record producer
- Horan (born 1979), South Korean singer and actress
- Hornswoggle (born 1986), American professional wrestler
- Horse (born 1958), Scottish singer-songwriter
- Horus (born 1982), Mexican professional wrestler
- Hoshi (born 1996), South Korean singer and dancer
- Hotboii (born 2000), American rapper
- Houdini (1998–2020), Canadian rapper
- Houston (born 1969), American pornographic actress
- Hoya (born 1991), South Korean singer, rapper, songwriter, dancer and actor
- Hozier (born 1990), Irish singer-songwriter
- Hrvy (born 1999), English singer and television personality
- Hu (born 1994), Italian singer-songwriter
- Hub (born 1978), Japanese professional wrestler
- Huddy (born 2002), American social media personality and singer
- Huey (1987–2020), American rapper
- Hui (born 1993), South Korean singer, songwriter and composer
- Hümeyra (born 1947), Turkish actress and singer-songwriter
- Humph (1921–2008), English jazz musician and broadcaster
- Hunterz, Pakistani-born English musician
- Husalah (born 1979), American rapper
- Hush (born 1972), American rap rock and hip hop artist
- Huskii (born 1992), Australian rapper and musician
- Husky (born 1993), Russian rapper
- Husna, Pakistani actress
- Hwanhee (born 1982), South Korean singer and actor
- Hwasa (born 1995), South Korean singer, songwriter and television personality
- Hyan (born 1992), American professional wrestler
- Hyde (born 1969), Japanese singer and lyricist
- Hydra (aka Leslie Butterscotch), American wrestler
- Hyeeunyee (born 1954), South Korean singer and broadcaster
- Hynn (born 1998), South Korean singer and songwriter
- Hyolyn (born 1990), South Korean singer-songwriter
- Hyomin (born 1989), South Korean singer and actress
- Hyuna (born 1992), South Korean singer

== I ==
- IAMDDB (born 1996), Angolan rapper and singer
- Iame, American rapper and record producer
- Iamisee, American rapper and producer
- Iamnotshane (born 1991), American singer and songwriter
- Iamsu! (born 1989), American rapper and record producer
- Iasos (1947–2024), Greek-born American musician and composer
- IBali (born 1997), Cameroonian musical artist and performer
- Icarus (born 1982), American wrestler
- Iceberg, American professional wrestler
- IceJJFish (born 1994), American internet personality, singer, rapper and dancer
- ICHIKO (born 1970), Japanese singer-songwriter
- Ichimaru (1906–1997), Japanese recording artist and geisha
- Iconiq (born 1984), Japanese singer, actress and MC
- Idir (1949–2020), Algerian musician
- IDK (born 1992), British-American rapper, singer, songwriter and record producer
- iET (born 1978), Dutch singer-songwriter
- iFani (born 1985), South African Hip-Hop/Rap artist, MC and television presenter
- Iftekhar (1922–1995), Indian actor
- Ighraa (born 1945), Syrian actress and belly dancer
- Ihriel (born 1972), Norwegian musician and singer
- Ihsahn (born 1975), Norwegian composer, musician and singer
- iJustine (born 1984), American YouTube personality, host, actress and model
- Ikura (born 2000), Japanese singer-songwriter
- Ilacoin (born 1973), American rapper and producer
- Ilaiyaraaja (born 1943), Indian singer and composer
- Ilanit (born 1947), Israeli singer
- ili (born 1998), Scottish singer-songwriter
- Illbliss, Nigerian rapper and actor
- Illenium (born 1990), American musician, DJ, music producer and songwriter
- iLLmacuLate (born 1986), Native American battle rapper and hip hop artist
- Illmind (born 1980), Filipino American hip hop producer
- Illogic (born 1980), American indie hip hop artist
- IllRymz (born 1985), Nigerian television host, radio personality, producer, event MC and model
- Illson (born 1982), South Korean rapper
- Illy (born 1986), Australian rapper, singer, songwriter
- iLoveMakonnen (born 1989), American rapper, singer, songwriter and record producer
- iLoveMemphis (born 1993), American rapper
- Ima (aka IMA; born 1978), Canadian singer
- Imaani (born 1972), English singer
- Iman (born 1955), Somali American supermodel
- Imany (born 1979), Comores Islands Afro-soul singer
- Imposible, Mexican professional wrestler
- Imposs (born 1980), Canadian rapper
- India (born 1977), American pornographic actress, singer and rap artist
- Indians, Danish singer-songwriter and musician
- Indigo (born 1984), American actress
- Indila (born 1984), French singer
- Indio, Canadian singer-songwriter
- Indrans (born 1957), Indian actor
- Inez (born 1977), Danish singer
- Infamous (born 1980), American record producer, songwriter, multi-instrumentalist and DJ
- Infernus (born 1972), Norwegian black metal musician
- Infinite, Canadian rapper
- Ingola (born 1973), Slovak singer
- Ingratax (born 2000), Mexican singer and songwriter
- Inji (born 2001), Turkish singer-songwriter
- Inna (born 1986), Romanian singer
- Innovator (born 1988), South Korean rapper
- Inoki (born 1979), Italian rapper and record producer
- Inoran (born 1970), Japanese musician and singer-songwriter
- Inquisidor (born 1977), Mexican professional wrestler
- Insooni (born 1957), South Korean singer
- Instasamka (born 2000), Russian pop singer and rap artist
- Inti (born 2000), Bolivian-Spanish drag queen
- Intuition (born 1981), American rapper
- Invincible, American-Israeli rapper
- Iota (born 1968), Australian singer-songwriter, musician and actor
- IQ (born 1987), Russian rapper
- Iraj (1933–2026), Iranian singer
- Irama (born 1995), Italian singer-songwriter and rapper
- IRAWniQ (born 1986), American rapper, singer, songwriter and producer
- Irene (born 1991), South Korean singer, actress and television host
- Iris (born 1995), Belgian singer
- Iron (1992–2021), South Korean rapper
- Ironik (born 1988), British musician, DJ and rapper
- iSH, Canadian singer, actor
- IshDARR (born 1996), American rapper, hip hop artist and actor
- IShowSpeed (born 2005), American YouTuber and rapper
- Ishtar (born 1968), Israeli-born French singer
- Islaja (born 1979), Finnish singer-songwriter and musician
- Isleym (born 1994), French singer-songwriter
- Isol (born 1972), Argentine singer
- IU (born 1993), South Korean singer-songwriter and actress
- Iva (born 1978), Swedish-American singer-songwriter and bandleader
- Ivan (born 1962), Spanish singer
- Ivana (born 1969), Bulgarian singer
- Ivar (born 1984), American wrestler
- Ivory (born 1961), American wrestler
- Ivy (born 1982), South Korean singer, model and occasional actress
- Ivy (born 1987), Chinese singer, rapper, dancer, actress and television personality
- Iwan (born 1980), Lebanese singer
- Iza (born 1990), Brazilian singer-songwriter and dancer
- Izi (born 1995), Italian rapper and actor
- Izzy (born 1996), Brazilian singer and songwriter

== J ==
- J (born 1970), Japanese musician, singer, songwriter and record producer
- J (born 1977), Korean-American singer
- Jabee (born 1983), American hip hop artist and actor
- Jacaré (born 1972), Brazilian dancer and actor
- Jackmaster (1986–2024), Scottish disc jockey and record producer
- Jacno (1957–2009), French musician
- Jacotin (d. 1529), Franco-Flemish singer and composer
- jacksepticeye (born 1990), Irish YouTuber and comedian
- Jadakiss (born 1975), American rapper
- Jado (born 1968), Japanese professional wrestler
- Jadu (born 1988), German singer, musician and songwriter
- Jaehyun (born 1997), South Korean singer
- Jaël (born 1979), Swiss singer-songwriter and guitarist
- Jafaris (born 1995), Zimbabwean-born Irish rapper, singer and songwriter
- Jagdeep (1939–2020), Indian actor and comedian
- Jaguar (born 1986), Kenyan singer
- Jai (born 1981), American Christian R&B and gospel artist and musician
- Jai (born 1984), Indian actor and musician
- Jaibi (1943–1984), American singer-songwriter
- Jaimeson (born 1976), British musician, emcee and producer
- Jain (born 1992), French singer-songwriter and musician
- Jaishankar (1938–2000), Indian actor
- Jaka (1986–2025), American professional wrestler
- Jakwob (born 1989), British music producer, songwriter, DJ and composer
- Jallal (born 1993), American rapper
- Jaloo (born 1987), Brazilian singer-songwriter, DJ and music producer
- Jamala (born 1983), Ukrainian singer-songwriter and actress
- Jamelão (1913–2008), Brazilian samba singer
- Jamie (born 1997), South Korean singer, songwriter and television host
- Jamileh (born 1946), Iranian actress, cabaret performer and dancer
- Jammer (born 1982), British grime MC, rapper, songwriter and record producer
- Jamule (born 1996), German rapper
- Jana (born 1974), Serbian singer
- Jandek (born 1945), American musician
- Janta (born 1989), Malawian Afro Pop artist
- Jão (born 1994), Brazilian singer-songwriter
- Jaqee (born 1977), Ugandan-Swedish musician
- Jasiah (born 1996), American rapper, songwriter and record producer
- Jasmine (born 1981), Chinese-born Taiwanese singer-songwriter and musician
- Jason (born 1965), Norwegian cartoonist
- Jasmine (born 1989), Japanese singer and songwriter
- Jauz (born 1993), American DJ and electronic dance music producer
- Jawaher (1977–2023), Kuwaiti actress
- Jax (born 1996), American singer-songwriter and social media personality
- Jax (born 1997), American drag queen and dancer
- Jaya (born 1970), Filipino singer, record producer, TV hostess and actress
- Jayabharathi, Indian actress
- Jayachitra (born 1957), Indian actress
- Jayamala, Indian actress
- Jayamalini (born 1948), Indian actress
- Jayan (1938–1980), Indian actor
- Jayant (1915–1975), Indian film actor
- Jayanthi (born 1950), Indian actress
- Jayasudha (born 1958), Indian actress-turned-politician
- JayDaYoungan (1998–2022), American rapper and singer
- Jaydes (born 2006), American rapper, singer, producer and songwriter
- Jaykae, British rapper and actor
- JaySynths (born 1988), Nigerian record producer and sound engineer
- Jayso (born 1983), Ghanaian rapper, record producer, singer and songwriter
- Jaysus (born 1982), German rapper
- Jay-Z (born 1969), American rapper and record producer
- Jazz (born 1972), American wrestler
- JB, Canadian hip hop musician
- JDiggz (born 1986), Canadian hip hop MC and producer
- Jeeep (born 1974), Russian rapper
- Jeanette (born 1951), English-born Spanish singer and actress
- Jędker (born 1977), Polish emcee
- Jedward (born 1991), Irish singing and television presenting duo
- Jeet (born 1978), Indian actor
- Jeetendra (born 1942), Indian actor
- Jeeva (born 1952), Telugu actor
- Jeevan (born 1975), Indian actor
- Jeezy (born 1977), American rapper
- Jehst (born 1979), English rapper
- Jel (born 1978), American hip hop producer and rapper
- Jelleestone, Canadian rapper
- Jem (born 1975), Welsh singer-songwriter
- Jeremías (born 1973), British-born Venezuelan singer-songwriter
- Jeremih (born 1987), American singer-songwriter and producer
- Jero (born 1981), American-born Japanese singer
- Jeshi (born 1995), English rapper, record producer and songwriter
- JessB, New Zealand rapper
- Jessi (born 1988), Korean-American rapper and singer
- Jessicka (born 1975), American singer-songwriter
- Jesswar, Fijian-Australian hip hop artist
- Jesto (1984–2025), Italian rapper
- Jethro (1920–1989), American musician
- Jethro (1948–2021), English stand-up comedian and singer
- Jetta (born 1987), British wrestler
- JGivens (born 1987), American Christian hip hop musician
- Jhayco (born 1993), Puerto Rican rapper and singer
- J-Hope (born 1994), South Korean rapper
- Jibbs (born 1990), American rapper
- JID (born 1990), American rapper and singer
- Jigsaw (born 1983), American wrestler
- Jiiva (born 1984), Tamil actor
- Jikki (1935–2004), Indian playback singer
- Jillana (born 1934), American ballet dancer
- Jillionaire (born 1978), Trinidadian DJ and music producer
- Jimbo (born 1982), Canadian drag queen
- Jimeoin (born 1966), Irish-born Australian actor and comedian
- Jimin (born 1995), South Korean singer
- Jimothy, British rapper and musician
- Jimwat (born 1985), Kenyan rapper
- Jin (born 1992), South Korean singer
- Jini (born 2004), South Korean singer and actress
- Jinjin (born 1996), South Korean rapper, dancer, singer and composer
- Jinu (born 1971), American rapper, singer and songwriter
- Jinxx (born 1981), American musician and songwriter
- Jippu (born 1985), Finnish pop singer
- Jipsta (born 1974), American rapper, songwriter and music producer
- Jiro (born 1972), Japanese musician
- Jiva (born 1982), Azerbaijani singer and songwriter
- JJ (born 2001), Austrian singer-songwriter
- Jlin (born 1987), American electronic musician
- Jme (born 1985), British grime MC, songwriter, record producer and DJ
- JMSN, American singer, songwriter, multi-instrumentalist and record producer
- Joanna (born 1957), Brazilian singer
- Jobriath (1946–1983), American glam rock singer
- Jøden (born 1974), Danish rapper
- Joe (born 1973), American singer, songwriter and record producer
- Joella (born 1999), American drag performer
- Joeystarr (born 1967), French rapper
- Johniepee (born 1992), Australian rapper, songwriter and record producer
- Joji (born 1993), Japanese singer-songwriter, rapper, Internet personality and record producer
- JoJo (born 1990), American singer and songwriter
- JoJo (born 1994), American ring announcer, valet, professional wrestler and singer
- Joker (born 1983), American wrestler
- Joker (born 1987), Turkish rapper, singer and songwriter
- Joker (born 1989), British record producer
- Jokeren (born 1973), Danish rapper and hip hop artist
- Jolens (born 1978), Filipino actress, recording artist and television host
- Jonah (born 1988), Australian wrestler
- Jonell (born 1977), American singer
- Jonesmann (born 1979), German rapper
- Jonezen (born 1984), American rapper, songwriter, actor and guitarist
- Jónsi (born 1975), Icelandic musician
- Jont (born 1973), British singer-songwriter
- Jonwayne (born 1990), American rapper and record producer
- Jony (born 1996), Azerbaijani-Russian singer, songwriter and rapper
- JooE (born 1999), South Korean rapper and singer
- Joohoney (born 1994), South Korean rapper, singer, songwriter and producer
- Jooks (born 1980), Danish rapper
- Jopay (born 1983), Filipino singer, dancer and actress
- Jordan (1955–2022), English model and actress
- Jordan (born 1978), English model
- Jords (born 1994), British singer and rapper
- JORDY, American singer-songwriter
- Jorgeous, American drag performer
- Joseffy (1873–1946), Austrian magician
- Joselito (born 1943), Spanish singer and actor
- Joselo (1936–2013), Venezuelan actor and comedian
- Josylvio (born 1992), Dutch rapper
- Journalist, American rapper
- Jovanotti (born 1966), Italian singer-songwriter and rapper
- Jovi (born 1983), Cameroonian rapper and songwriter
- Jowall, South Korean musician
- Joy (born 1996), South Korean singer and actress
- Joyryde (born 1985), English DJ and producer
- JP (born 1984), American singer and songwriter
- JPEGMafia (born 1989), American rapper, singer and record producer
- JR (born 1987), South African musician
- jschlatt (born 1999), American YouTuber, Twitch streamer, podcaster and singer
- Json (born 1981), American Christian hip hop musician
- J-Son (born 1985), Brazilian-Swedish singer
- JSX, French rapper
- JT (born 1992), American rapper
- JTG (born 1984), American professional wrestler
- Juanes (born 1972), Colombian singer-songwriter and guitarist
- Juanito (born 1936), French singer
- Jude (born 1969), American singer-songwriter
- Judeline (born 2003), Spanish singer and songwriter
- Juggernaut (born 1975), Canadian professional wrestler
- Juice (born 1981), Serbian rapper
- Juiceboxxx, American rapper and producer
- Juju (born 1976), Japanese singer
- Juju (born 1984), Finnish rapper
- Juju (born 1992), German rapper
- Jujubee (born 1984), American performer and TV personality
- Juka (born 1981), Japanese singer
- Jul (born 1990), French rapper hip hop artist
- Juli (born 1998), Italian record producer and disc jockey
- Julissa (born 1944), Mexican actress, producer and singer
- Jullie (born 1988), Brazilian singer-songwriter, model, actress and presenter
- Julyo (born 1978), Italian guitarist, songwriter, producer and DJ
- Jumz (born 1984), American rapper
- JUN (born 1983), Japanese visual kei rock musician and singer-songwriter
- Jun (born 1996), Chinese-South Korean singer, dancer and actor
- June (born 1987), South Korean singer
- Jungah (born 1983), South Korean singer
- Junggigo (born 1980), South Korean singer
- Jungkook (born 1997), South Korean singer
- Junglepussy (born 1991), American rapper and actress
- Juniel (born 1993), South Korean singer-songwriter
- Júnior (1943–2014), Filipino-Spanish singer
- Junjun (born 1988), Chinese-Japanese singer
- Juno (born 1987), Finnish rapper
- Junoflo (born 1992), South Korean-American rapper
- Justhis (born 1991), South Korean rapper
- Just-Ice (born 1965), American rapper
- Juvelen (born 1976), Swedish electro-pop singer
- Juvenile (born 1975), American rapper
- Jux (born 1989), Tanzanian artist and songwriter
- Jvke (born 2001), American singer-songwriter and record producer
- JyellowL (born 1998), Nigerian-Irish rapper
- Jyongri (born 1988), Japanese musician and singer-songwriter

== K ==
- K (born 1983), South Korean singer
- K (born 1987), Indian music composer
- K (born 1997), Japanese singer, dancer and actor
- K.Maro (born 1980), Lebanese Canadian singer, record producer, entrepreneur
- Ka (1972–2024), American rapper and producer
- Käärijä (born 1993), Finnish rapper, singer and songwriter
- Kaaris, French rapper
- Kafani (born 1980), American rapper
- Kaffy (born 1980), Nigerian dancer and choreographer
- Kafon (1983–2025), Tunisian rapper, singer and actor
- Kafu (born 1978), Brazilian professional wrestler
- Kagetora (born 1982), Japanese professional wrestler
- Kagetsu (born 1992), Japanese professional wrestler
- Kahagas (born 1973), Japanese-American professional wrestler
- Kahi (born 1980), South Korean singer-songwriter, dancer and choreographer
- Kahukx, Australian rapper and musician
- Kai (born 1981), South Korean singer and musical theatre actor
- Kai (born 1983), Japanese professional wrestler
- Kai (born 1990), Canadian singer-songwriter
- Kai (born 1994), South Korean dancer, singer and model
- Kaiser (1961–2026), Burmese singer-songwriter
- Kaitlyn (born 1986), American entrepreneur, bodybuilder, model and professional wrestler
- Kaja (born 1968), Montenegrin singer-songwriter
- Kajjanbai (1915–1945), Indian singer and actress
- Kakie (born 2000), Filipino singer-songwriter
- Kakko (born 1969), Japanese actress, singer, and television presenter
- KaladKaren (born 1992), Filipino actress, TV host, impersonator and radio host
- Kalanag (1903–1963), German film producer and magician
- Kalash (born 1988), Martinican-born French rapper and singer
- Kaleen (born 1994), Austrian singer, dancer and choreographer
- Kalel (born 1976), American Christian musician
- Kali (born 1975), Bulgarian singer
- Kalifa (born 1989), American rapper
- Kaliii (born 2000), American rapper
- Kalisto (born 1986), Mexican-American professional wrestler
- Kalomoira (born 1985), Greek-American singer
- Kalpana (1943–1979), Indian actress
- Kalpana (1946–2012), Indian actress
- Kam (born 1969), American rapper
- Kamahl (born 1934), Australian singer
- Kamala (1950–2022), American wrestler
- Kamaliya (born 1977), Ukrainian musical performer, actress and model
- Kamauu, American singer and rapper
- Kamelanc' (born 1980), French rapper
- Kamelen (born 1993), Norwegian rapper
- Kamelia (born 1986), Romanian singer and songwriter
- Kam-Hill (1856–1935), French cabaret performer and singer
- Kami (born 1993), American rapper
- Kamijo (born 1975), Japanese singer-songwriter, musician and music producer
- Kamikaze (born 1971), Japanese professional wrestler
- Kamille (born 1992), American professional wrestler
- KaMillion, American rapper, singer, songwriter and actress
- Kamufle (born 1988), Turkish rapper, songwriter and actor
- Kana (born 1977), Finnish female rap musician
- Kanchana (born 1939), Indian actress
- Kane (born 1967), American wrestler and actor
- Kangin (born 1985), South Korean singer, actor, television host and radio personality
- Kangnam (born 1987), South Korean-Japanese singer and television personality
- Kangta (born 1979), South Korean singer
- Kanii (born 2005), American singer, rapper and songwriter
- Kanji (born 1994), English professional wrestler
- Kankan (born 2000), American rapper, producer and songwriter
- Kannadasan (1927–1981), Indian lyricist, producer, actor, script-writer and editor
- Kannazuki (born 1965), Japanese comedian
- Kano (born 1985), British rapper
- Kanon (born 1980), Japanese singer-songwriter and producer
- Kanon (born 1996), Japanese professional wrestler
- Kanto (born 1994), South Korean rapper and composer
- Kaos, Canadian drag performer
- Kapo (born 1997), Colombian singer and songwriter
- Karandash (1901–1983), Soviet clown
- Karencitta (born 1995), Filipino singer-songwriter and actress
- Karina (born 1945), Spanish singer
- Karina (born 1968), Venezuelan singer-songwriter and actress
- Karina (born 2000), South Korean singer and rapper
- Karolina (born 1971), Israeli singer-songwriter
- Karpaga, Indian transsexual actress
- Karrahbooo (born 1997), American rapper
- Karthi (born 1977), Indian actor
- Karthik (born 1960), Indian actor and playback singer
- Karunas (born 1970), Indian actor
- Karylle (born 1981), Filipina singer
- Kasavubu (1956–1982), American wrestler
- Kaskade (born 1971), American DJ, record producer and remixer
- Kashinath (1951–2018), Indian actor, director and filmmaker
- Kasmir (born 1985), Finnish singer, musician and record producer
- Kasper (born 1993), American singer, rapper and YouTuber
- Kassia, Byzantine composer
- Kassy (born 1995), South Korean singer-songwriter
- Kastro (born 1976), American rapper
- Katalina, American singer and music artist
- Katalyst, Australian DJ and producer
- Katastrofe (born 1989), Norwegian singer and songwriter
- Katastrophe (born 1979), American rapper
- Katie (born 1993), South Korean-born American singer
- Kato (born 1981), Danish DJ
- Katsuni (born 1979), French pornographic actress
- Kaun (born 1986), American professional wrestler
- Kavana (born 1977), English singer and actor
- Kaveri, Indian actress
- Kaves, American director, actor and rapper
- Kavinsky (1975–2026), French musician, producer, DJ and actor
- Kaviraj, Indian lyricist and film director
- Kaya, Japanese singer and musician
- Kayah (born 1967), Polish singer-songwriter
- Kayamar (born 1985), Hungarian singer, jazz and classical composer
- KayCyy (born 1997), Kenyan-American rapper, singer and songwriter
- Kayliah (born 1981), French singer
- Kaysha (born 1974), Congolese-born French rapper
- Kaytranada (born 1992), Haitian-Canadian electronic musician
- Kayzo (born 1991), American DJ
- Kaza, French rapper
- Kaze, American rapper
- Kazik (born 1963), Polish rock singer
- Kazlaser (born 1984), Japanese comedian
- Kazuki (born 1975), Japanese professional wrestler
- Kazzer (born 1977), Canadian musician and TV personality
- KB (born 1988), American Christian hip hop artist
- KCee (born 1979), Nigerian singer and songwriter
- K-Ci (born 1969), American singer and songwriter
- KCM, South Korean singer
- Kebee (born 1983), South Korean rapper, songwriter and record producer
- KeBlack (born 1992), French rapper and singer
- Kei (born 1995), South Korean singer and musical actress
- Keişan (born 1991), Turkish rapper and songwriter
- Keith (born 1949), American singer
- Kem (born 1967), American singer-songwriter and producer
- Kemba (born 1990), American rapper
- KeMonito (born 1967), Mexican professional wrestler
- Kempi (born 1986), Dutch rapper
- Ken (born 1968), Japanese guitarist
- Ken (born 1992), South Korean singer and actor
- Kennedy (born 1972), American political satirist, radio personality and former MTV VJ
- Keno (born 1962), Filipino singer and actor
- Kenoh (born 1985), Japanese professional wrestler
- KenTheMan (born 1994), American rapper
- Kerima (1925–2014), French former actress
- Kerser (born 1987), Australian rapper
- Keshi (born 1994), American singer-songwriter, multi-instrumentalist and record producer
- Kesi (born 1992), Danish rapper and songwriter
- Kevinho (born 1998), Brazilian singer and songwriter
- Kevvo (born 1998), Puerto Rican singer and rapper
- Kewpie (1942–2012), South African drag queen
- Key (born 1991), South Korean singer, dancer, rapper, actor, recording artist, promotional model, radio host and MC
- Keyra (born 1995), Mexican professional wrestler
- Keyti (born 1972), Senegalese Hip Hop performer
- KGee, Ghanaian hiplife and hip-hop rapper
- Khea (born 2000), Argentine rapper and singer
- Kheengz (born 1992), Nigerian rapper and actor
- Khianna (born 2001), Filipino drag performer
- Khontkar (born 1991), Turkish rapper, singer, songwriter and record producer
- Khosrovidukht, Armenian composer
- Khrysis (born 1981), American hip hop producer
- Khujo (born 1972), American rapper
- Khushboo (born 1980), Pakistani actress and dancer
- Kiara (born 1962), Venezuelan singer, actress and TV presenter
- Kiara (born 1998), Canadian drag entertainer
- Kibariye (born 1960), Turkish singer
- Kick (born 1979), Japanese comedian
- Kida (born 1997), Kosovo-Albanian singer
- Kidd (born 1996), American rapper
- Kidda (born 1997), Kosovo-Albanian rapper and singer
- Kiesza (born 1989), Canadian singer, instrumentalist
- Kiggen (born 1979), South Korean rapper, singer, lyricist, composer and record producer
- Kiiara (born 1995), American singer and songwriter
- Kiki (1901–1953), French artists' model, nightclub singer, actress and painter
- Kikka (1964–2005), Finnish singer
- Kikutaro (born 1976), Japanese professional wrestler
- Killagramz (born 1992), South Korean-American rapper
- Killer (1976–2014), American drag performer
- Killjoy (1966–2018), American musician; lead vocalist (Necrophagia)
- Killy (born 1997), Canadian rapper
- Kimbra (born 1990), New Zealand singer
- Kimera (born 1954), South Korean singer
- Kimeru (born 1980), Japanese musician, singer and actor
- Kina (born 1969), American musician
- Kinetics, American rapper and songwriter
- Kings (born 1991), New Zealand rapper, singer and songwriter
- Kino (born 1998), South Korean singer, songwriter, rapper, composer and dancer
- Kintalo (born 1981), Japanese comedian
- Kipper, British musician
- Kira (born 1977), Belgian singer and model
- Kira (born 1978), German singer-songwriter
- Kira (born 2003), Mexican professional wrestler
- Kirito (born 1972), Japanese singer
- Kirka (1950–2007), Finnish musician
- Kish (born 1970), Canadian voice actor and rapper
- Kishore (born 1974), Indian actor
- Kissey (born 1982), Swedish singer, songwriter, producer and performer
- Kisum (born 1994), South Korean rapper and television personality
- Kitarō (born 1953), Japanese New Age musician
- Kitkat (born 1987), Filipino singer, actress and comedian
- KittiB (born 1990), South Korean rapper and songwriter
- Kitty (born 1993), American rapper, singer and music producer
- Kiyoharu (born 1968), Japanese singer-songwriter
- Kizaru (born 1989), Russian hip-hop singer-songwriter
- Kizo (born 1994), Polish singer, songwriter and record producer
- KK (1968–2022), Indian playback singer
- Klaha (born 1970), Japanese singer
- Klashnekoff (born 1975), British rapper
- Klayton (born 1969), American musician and record producer
- Klopfer (born 1980), German writer
- Klumben (born 1987), Danish dancehall, hip hop and reggae artist
- K.Maro (born 1980), Lebanese-Canadian rapper
- K'naan (born 1978), Somali-Canadian poet, rapper and musician
- Knez (born 1967), Montenegrin singer
- Knightowl (1966–2022), Mexican-born American rapper
- Kno, American alternative hip hop rapper, producer and singer
- Knobody, American record producer
- Knox (born 1945), British singer-songwriter and guitarist
- Knxwledge (born 1988), American hip hop record producer and songwriter
- KODA (1978–2024), Ghanaian gospel singer, songwriter, record producer and multi-instrumentalist
- Koguma (born 1998), Japanese professional wrestler
- Kohaku (born 2001), Japanese professional wrestler
- Kohh (born 1990), Japanese hip hop recording artist
- Kohndo (born 1975), French rapper and producer
- Kojaque (born 1995), Irish rapper and record producer
- Kokane (born 1969), American rapper and singer
- Koker (born 1993), Nigerian singer and songwriter
- Kokia (born 1976), Japanese singer-songwriter and producer
- Kollegah (born 1984), German rapper
- Komander (born 1998), Mexican professional wrestler
- Kompany (born 1991), American producer and DJ
- Koncept (born 1985), American rapper, singer and songwriter
- KondZilla (born 1988), Brazilian YouTuber, music producer and TV director
- Konnan (born 1964), Cuban wrestler and rapper
- Konnor (born 1980), American professional wrestler
- Konshens (born 1985), Jamaican recording artist and DJ
- Kontour, English electronic music artist
- Kool (born 1950), American musician, singer and songwriter
- Kore, French music producer
- Koreless (born 1991), British electronic musician and recording artist
- Koriass (born 1984), Canadian rapper
- k-os (born 1972), Canadian rapper, singer, producer
- Kosmonova (born 1970), German DJ and music producer
- Kotoko (born 1980), Japanese singer-songwriter
- Kotringo (born 1978), Japanese singer-songwriter and pianist
- Koushik, Canadian musician
- Kovas (born 1985), American songwriter, record producer and recording artist
- Koxie (born 1977), French singer of Tunisian origin
- Koyuki (born 1976), Japanese model and actress
- Közi (born 1972), Japanese musician
- Kramer (born 1958), American musician and record producer
- Krazy (born 1976), American rapper
- Kraus, New Zealand musician and composer
- Kraus (born 1994/1995), American musician
- Kreayshawn (born 1989), American rapper
- Kreskin (1935–2024), American mentalist and television personality
- Kreva (born 1976), Japanese hip hop MC and producer
- Kris (born 1990), Canadian-Chinese singer and actor
- Krisdayanti (born 1975), Indonesian singer and actress
- Krish (born 1977), Indian playback singer
- Krishna (1943–2022), Indian actor
- Krishnaveni (born 1924), Indian actress, singer and producer
- Krisko (born 1988), Bulgarian recording artist, songwriter and producer
- Kristina (born 1987), Slovak singer
- Krizbeatz (born 1994), Nigerian record producer
- KRNFX (born 1989), South Korean-Canadian beatboxer and singer
- Krohme (born 1980), American hip hop MC and producer
- Krondon (born 1976), American rapper and actor
- KRSNA, Indian rapper
- KRS-One (born 1965), American rapper
- Krust (born 1968), English drum and bass producer and DJ
- Kshmr (born 1988), American musician, songwriter, DJ, record producer, rapper and singer
- KSI (born 1993), British YouTube personality, amateur boxer, comedian and actor
- Kube, Finnish rapper
- Kujira (born 1961), Japanese voice actress
- Kūkahi (born 1999), Hawaiian singer-songwriter
- Kumaarashi (born 1991), Japanese professional wrestler
- Kumar (born 1984), Cuban rapper
- Kunchacko (1912–1984), Indian producer and director
- Kungs (born 1996), French DJ, record producer and musician
- Kura (born 1987), Portuguese electro house DJ and record producer
- Kurious (born (1970), American hip hop artist
- Kuroneko, Japanese singer
- Kurupt (born 1972), American rapper
- Kushida (born 1983), Japanese wrestler
- Kutski (born 1982), British radio DJ
- Kuuga, Japanese professional wrestler
- Kwabs (born 1990), English singer and songwriter
- Kwes (born 1987), English record producer, songwriter and musician
- Kwesta (born 1988), South African rapper and songwriter
- Kxllswxtch (born 1999), American rapper and singer-songwriter
- Kydd, American rapper, producer and singer
- Kygo (born 1991), Norwegian DJ and music producer
- Kyla (born 1981), Filipino R&B singer-songwriter and occasional actress
- Kylee (born 1994), Japanese singer
- Kyo (born 1976), Japanese singer-songwriter and producer
- Kyouka (born 1999), Japanese businesswoman, television personality and former singer
- Kyper, American rapper
- Kyprios, Canadian rapper, singer, songwriter and actor
- Kytami (born 1985), Canadian musician
- Kyuhyun (born 1988), South Korean singer, dancer, actor and model
- Kyulkyung (born 1998), Chinese singer
- Kyuri (born 1998), Japanese professional wrestler
- Kzy (born 1986), Japanese professional wrestler

== L ==
- L (born 1981), French singer-songwriter
- L (born 1992), South Korean singer and actor
- Lââm (born 1971), French singer
- Laava (born 1983), Brazilian singer
- Labrinth (born 1989), English singer-songwriter and producer
- Labtekwon, American Hip Hop artist
- Lacey (born 1983), American wrestler
- Lach, American musician and songwriter
- LaChanze (born 1961), American actress, singer and dancer
- Lachi, American visually impaired musician
- Lacrim (born 1985), Algérian-French rapper
- LadBaby (born 1987), English YouTuber, musician and blogger
- Ladipoe, Nigerian rapper and musician
- Lady (born 1989), American rapper
- Ladybeard (born 1983), Australian stuntman, professional wrestler, singer and online streamer
- Ladyhawke (born 1979), New Zealand singer-songwriter and musician
- Lafawndah, French singer, songwriter, producer and director
- LaFee (born 1990), German pop singer and television actress
- Lagbaja (born 1960), Nigerian Afrobeat musician, singer and songwriter
- Lahannya, British singer-songwriter, performer and DJ
- Laíla (1943–2021), Brazilian singer and composer
- Lakshmi (born 1952), Indian actress
- Lakutis (born 1985), American rapper
- Lal (born 1958), Indian director and actor
- L'Algérino (born 1981), French rapper of Algerian descent
- Lamix (born 1997), Swedish rapper
- Lana (born 1985), American wrestler
- Lanzeloth (born 1995), Mexican professional wrestler
- Laraaji (born 1943), American musician
- Larry (born 1998), French rapper
- Lartiste (born 1985), French-Moroccan singer and rapper
- Larusso (born 1979), French singer
- Lasso (born 1988), Venezuelan singer and composer
- Látigo (born 1996), Mexican professional wrestler
- Latino (born 1973), Brazilian singer
- Latonius (born 1981), American musician, singer, songwriter and choir director
- Latto (born 1998), American rapper
- Laure (born 1989), Nepalese rapper and television personality
- Lauv (born 1994), American singer, songwriter and record producer
- Lay (born 1991), Chinese singer
- Laycon (born 1993), Nigerian rapper, singer, songwriter and media personality
- Laylow (born 1993), French rapper
- Lazarus, American rapper and songwriter
- Lazee (born 1985), Swedish rapper
- Lazerbeak (born 1982), American record producer, singer and guitarist
- Lazza (born 1994), Italian rapper and record producer
- Lbenj (born 1983), Moroccan singer
- LD (born 1992), British rapper
- LDA (born 2003), Italian singer-songwriter and rapper
- LE (born 1991), South Korean rapper, songwriter and composer
- Le1f (born 1989), American rapper
- Lebleba (born 1946), Egyptian-Armenian film actress and entertainer
- Lecca (born 1979), Japanese singer-songwriter
- Leck (born 1988), French rapper
- Ledeni, Slovenian rapper
- Leelavathi (1937–2023), Indian actress
- Leellamarz (born 1995), South Korean rapper and singer
- Leeseo (born 2007), South Korean singer
- Leeteuk (born 1983), South Korean singer and presenter
- Lefa (born 1985), French rapper and dancer
- Lehri (1929–2012), Pakistani actor and comedian
- LehtMoJoe, American record producer and electronic hip hop rapper
- Lekain (1728–1778), French actor
- Leki (born 1978), Congolese-Belgian R&B artist
- Lele (born 1996), Italian singer-songwriter
- Lemmy (1945–2015), English musician, bass guitarist and singer-songwriter
- Lemon (born 1995), Canadian drag performer
- Lenine (born 1959), Brazilian singer-songwriter
- Lenny (born 1993), Czech singer, songwriter, composer, lyricist and pianist
- Leno (1949–2022), Brazilian singer, composer and guitarist
- Lenzman (d. 2026), Dutch drum and bass producer
- Leo (born 1990), South Korean singer, songwriter and musical theatre actor
- Leon (born 1969), German singer
- Leonardo (born 1963), Brazilian singer
- Léonce (1823–1900), French comic actor and singer
- Leoncie, Indian–Icelandic musician
- Léonin (d. 1201), French composer
- Leono (born 1982), Mexican professional wrestler
- Leto, French rapper
- Letrux (born 1982), Brazilian singer-songwriter
- Levaniel (born 1997), German professional wrestler
- Levante (born 1987), Italian singer-songwriter and model
- Lex (born 1984), Greek rapper
- Lexa (born 1995), Brazilian singer-songwriter and dancer
- Lexy (born 1979), Korean singer and rapper
- Leyona (born 1977), Japanese singer-songwriter
- Lia (born 1984), Japanese singer-songwriter
- Lia (born 2000), South Korean singer
- Lido (born 1992), Norwegian musician, record producer, singer and songwriter
- Life, British rapper
- Ligalize (born 1977), Russian hip hop artist
- Ligero, British wrestler
- Lights (born 1987), Canadian singer-songwriter and musician
- Lijpe (born 1992), Dutch rapper
- Like, American record producer, rapper, DJ and songwriter
- Lili, Japanese singer
- LiLiCo (born 1970), Swedish TV personality and film critic
- Liljay (born 1986), Taiwanese singer, actor, songwriter, presenter and dancer
- Lill-Babs (1938–2018), Swedish singer and actress
- Lilo (1921–2022), German-born French actress and singer
- LIM (born 1979), French rapper and producer
- Limahl (born 1958), British singer
- Limenius, Athenian musician and composer
- Liminha (born 1951), Brazilian musician and producer
- Lina, American singer-songwriter
- Lina (born 1984), South Korean musical actress and singer
- Linda (born 1977), Russian singer-songwriter
- Lino, French-Congolese rapper
- Lio (born 1962), Portuguese-born Belgian singer and actress
- Lionheart (1982–2019), British professional wrestler
- Liquid (born 1979), American Christian hip hop musician and R&B recording artist
- Liroy (born 1971), Polish rapper
- Lisa (born 1974), Japanese-Colombian singer and producer
- Lisa (born 1980), South Korean singer and musical theatre actress
- LiSA (born 1987), Japanese singer-songwriter
- Lisa (born 1997), Thai rapper and singer
- Lissie (born 1982), American singer-songwriter
- Lissy (born 1967), Indian actress
- Lita (born 1975), American singer and professional wrestler
- Litefoot (born 1968), American actor and musician
- Lithe, Australian rapper, singer-songwriter and record producer
- Livestock, Canadian rapper
- Liyuu (born 1997), Chinese singer, voice actress and cosplayer
- Liz (born 2004), South Korean singer
- Lizmark (1950–2015), Mexican professional wrestler
- Lizzo (born 1988), American rapper and singer-songwriter
- Lluvia (born 1984), Mexican professional wrestler
- Lobão (born 1957), Brazilian singer-songwriter and TV host
- Lobo (born 1943), American singer-songwriter
- Lobo (born 1975), American wrestler
- L.O.C. (born 1979), Danish rapper
- Lockah (born 1985), Scottish record producer and DJ
- Lockroy (1803–1891), French actor
- Locksmith (born 1984), American rapper
- Loco (born 1989), South Korean rapper
- Loden, Belgium electronic music producer
- Lodi (born 1970), American professional wrestler
- Logic (born 1990), American rapper and singer
- Lojay (born 1996), Nigerian singer, songwriter and producer
- Lolita (1931–2010), Austrian singer
- Lolita (1950–1986), Italian singer
- Lollipop (born 1979), American professional wrestler
- Lolly (born 1977), British singer, TV presenter and actress
- LOLO (born 1987), American singer, songwriter and actress
- Lomelda, American musician
- Lomepal (born 1991), French rapper and singer
- LONDON (born 1999), Nigerian-British record producer and disc jockey
- Lonyo (born 1974), British producer and MC
- Lookas, American music producer and DJ
- Loon (born 1975), American rapper
- Loona (born 1974), Dutch pop singer and dancer
- Loopy (born 1987), South Korean rapper
- Loptimist (born 1985), South Korean rapper
- Loquillo (born 1960), Spanish singer
- Lor (born 1991), Cameroonian rapper, singer-songwriter, actress, animator and multi-instrumentist
- Lora (born 1982), Romanian singer
- Lorde (born 1996), New Zealand singer-songwriter and record producer
- Loreen (born 1983), Swedish singer and music producer
- Loren (born 1995), South Korean singer-songwriter and producer
- Lorenzo (born 1994), French rapper
- Lorie (born 1982), French singer-songwriter and actress
- Loriot (1923–2011), German humorist, film director and actor
- Los, American rapper
- Loscil, Canadian musician
- Loski (born 1999), British rapper and singer
- Lou (born 1963), German singer
- Louane (born 1996), French singer and actress
- Loud (born 1988), Canadian rapper
- Louie (born 1990), South Korean rapper
- Louiguy (1916–1991), Spanish-born French musician
- Louiselle (born 1946), Italian singer
- Louison (1668–after 1692), French operatic soprano and celebrity
- Louta (born 1994), Argentine musician, producer, songwriter, disc-jockey and actor
- Lovefoxxx (born 1984), Brazilian singer
- Lovefreekz, British producer and remixer
- LoveRance (born 1989), American rapper, record producer and DJ
- Lowkey (born 1986), British musician, poet and playwright
- LP (born 1981), American singer, musician and songwriter
- Lsdxoxo (born 1991), American DJ and producer
- LSP (born 1989), Belarusian singer-songwriter and rapper[
- Luba (born 1958), Canadian singer-songwriter and musician
- Lucas (born 1999), Hong Kong rapper
- Luce (born 1990), French singer-songwriter
- Lucenzo (born 1983), Portuguese-French singer-songwriter and producer
- Luchasaurus (born 1985), American professional wrestler and television personality
- Luchè (born 1981), Italian rapper and record producer
- Lucía (born 1964), Spanish singer
- Luciano (born 1964), Jamaican singer-songwriter
- Luciano (born 1978), Swiss-Chilean DJ and producer
- Luciano (born 1994), German rapper
- Lucifer (1960–2011), American professional wrestler
- Luciferno (born 1972), Mexican professional wrestler
- Lucrezia, Italian singer
- Luckyiam (born 1973), American rapper
- Ludacris (born 1977), American rapper
- LuFisto (born 1980), French Canadian professional wrestler
- Luhan (born 1990), Chinese singer and actor
- Luka (born 1979), Brazilian singer and songwriter
- Lulu (born 1948), Scottish singer-songwriter and actress
- Luna (born 1990), Ukrainian indie pop singer-songwriter and model
- Luna (born 1993), South Korean singer and musical actress
- Lunay (born 2000), Puerto Rican singer and rapper
- Lungskull (2006–2026), French rapper and producer
- Lunna (born 1960), Puerto Rican singer
- Lura (born 1975), Portuguese singer and musician
- Lushlife (born 1981), American rapper and record producer
- Lustmord, Welsh musician, sound designer and composer
- LustSickPuppy (born 1997), American rapper and model
- Lute (born 1989), American rapper
- Luxxury, American producer, songwriter and DJ
- Luz (1993–2025), Japanese singer
- Lxandra (born 1996), Finnish singer and songwriter
- Lyanno (born 1995), Puerto Rican singer-songwriter
- Lyldoll (born 1993), Canadian singer-songwriter
- Lyn (born 1981), South Korean singer
- Lynja (1956–2024), American celebrity chef and Internet personality
- Lynn (born 1992), Japanese voice actress
- Lynnsha (born 1979), French singer
- Lynxxx (born 1983), Nigerian hip-hop recording artist
- Lyrian (born 1985), Italian-born Japanese singer
- Lyrik, Israeli music producer, dancer and singer
- Lyrikal (born 1983), Nigerian rapper, record producer and songwriter

== M ==
- -M- (born 1971), French musician guitarist
- MAA (born 1986), Japanese singer-songwriter, former television host and model
- Maanu (?–1996), Indian actor, television director and author
- Maanu, Indian dancer and actress
- Mac (born 1977), American rapper
- Macanache (born 1988), Romanian hip-hop MC
- Maccasio (born 1995), Ghanaian Hip hop, Hiplife and Afropop recording artist
- Mace (born 1991), American professional wrestler
- Machinedrum (born 1982), American electronic record producer and performer
- Machito (c. 1909–1984), Cuban jazz musician
- Macklemore (born 1983), American rapper, singer and songwriter
- Macnivil (born 1992), Indian rapper, songwriter and music video director
- Macromantics (born 1980), Australian hip hop artist
- Madame (born 2002), Italian rapper and singer-songwriter
- Madchild (born 1975), Canadian rapper
- MadeinTYO (born 1992), American rapper and singer
- Madeon (born 1994), French musician, DJ, producer and singer
- Madh (born 1993), Italian singer, rapper and songwriter
- Madhavi (born 1962), Indian actress
- Madhoo (born 1969), Indian actress
- Madhu (born 1933), Indian actor
- Madhubala (1933–1969), Indian actress
- Madhumitha (born 1981), Indian actress
- Madhushree (born 1969), Indian singer
- Madita (born 1978), Austrian singer and actress
- Madlib (born 1973), American DJ, musician, rapper and producer
- Madman (born 1988), Italian rapper
- Madoka (born 1983), Japanese professional wrestler
- Madusa (born 1963), American monster truck driver and former professional wrestler
- Maejor (born 1988), American record producer, songwriter and singer
- Maes (born 1995), French rapper of Moroccan origin
- Maestro (born 1980), American producer, singer-songwriter and rapper
- Maestro (born 1968), Canadian rapper, record producer and actor
- Maethelvin, French musician
- Maffio (born 1986), Dominican music producer and composer
- Magasco (born 1988), Cameroonian singer-songwriter
- Maggot, German professional wrestler
- Maggot (born 1976), British rapper
- Maggz, South African rapper
- Magic (1975–2013), American rapper
- Magik (1978–2000), Polish rapper
- Magnet (born 1970), Norwegian singer-songwriter
- Magnetica, Bolivian-born French drag performer
- Magnifico (born 1965), Slovenian singer
- Magno (born 1984), Mexican professional wrestler
- Magnus (born 1993), Mexican professional wrestler
- Mahal (1974–2021), Filipina actress, comedienne and vlogger
- Mahasti (1946–2007), Iranian-American singer
- Mahendran, Indian actor
- Mahendran (1939–2019), Indian film director and actor
- Mahlathini (1937/1938–1999), South African singer
- Mahmood (born 1992), Italian singer-songwriter
- Mahvash (1920–1961), Iranian singer, dancer, film actress and stage performer
- Maía (born 1981), Colombian singer-songwriter
- MΔîDΔY, English singer-songwriter
- Maika (born 1998), Japanese professional wrestler
- Maino (born 1973), American rapper
- Maïté (1938–2024), French television cooking host and actress
- Majdala (1946–2020), Lebanese singer
- Majestic, English musician
- Majid (born 1975), Danish rapper of Moroccan-Berber origin
- Majk (born 1989), Kosovo-Albanian rapper
- Majka (born 1979), Hungarian rapper and songwriter
- Majoe (born 1989), German rapper
- Makano (born 1983), Panamanian singer
- Makhadzi (born 1996), South African singer, songwriter and dancer
- Maki (born 1999), Filipino singer and songwriter
- Mākii (born 1987), Japanese musician and singer-songwriter
- Makj (born 1990), American DJ and music producer
- Mäkki, Estonian-born Finnish rapper and DJ
- Makleen (born 1991), Dominican singer and rapper
- Mako (1933–2006), Japanese-American actor, voice actor and singer
- Mako (born 1988), American songwriter, music producer, composer and DJ
- Makoto (born 1989), Japanese professional wrestler
- MakSim (born 1983), Russian female singer
- Mala (1942–1990), Pakistani singer
- Malanga (1885–1927), Cuban rumba dancer
- Malavika (born 1979), Indian actress
- Mali (born 1993), Indian singer-songwriter
- Malia (born 1983), Japanese fashion model
- Mallika, Indian actress
- Maloi (born 2002), Filipino singer and dancer
- Małolat (born 1984), Polish rapper
- Malú (born 1982), Spanish singer
- Malukah (born 1982), Mexican composer and singer-songwriter
- Maluma (born 1994), Colombian singer and songwriter
- Mameli (born 1995), Italian singer-songwriter
- Mammootty (born 1951), Indian actor
- Mana (born 1969), Japanese musician and fashion icon
- Manafest (born 1979), Canadian rapper
- Manchild, American Christian rapper
- Mancow (born 1966), American radio and television personality and actor
- Mandakini (born 1969), Indian actress
- Mandaryna (born 1978), Polish singer, dancer and actress
- Mando (born 1966), Greek singer-songwriter
- Mandolino (1934–2014), Chilean comedian
- Mandoza (1978–2016), South African singer-songwriter and recording artist
- Manduka (1952–2004), Brazilian composer, singer, guitarist and songwriter
- Mani (1962–2025), English musician
- Maniaco (born 1966), Mexican wrestler
- Manikuttan (born 1986), Indian actor
- Maninni (born 1997), Italian singer-songwriter
- Manitoba (born 1978), Canadian musician
- Mankind (born 1965), American wrestler, actor and comedian
- Mann (born 1991), American rapper
- Mano (born 1965), Indian singer
- Manobala (1953–2023), Indian director and comedian actor
- Manorama (1937–2015), Indian actress
- Manoush (born 1971), Dutch actress and singer-songwriter
- Manskee (born 1978), Filipino-American musician
- Mantas (born 1961), English heavy metal guitarist
- Mantaur (1968–2023), American wrestler
- Manu (born 1989), Slovenian singer, songwriter and music producer
- Manuela (1943–2001), German singer
- Manya (born 1982), Indian actress
- Manzanita (1956–2004), Spanish singer and guitarist
- Mãolee, Brazilian music producer
- Maradja, French singer, songwriter and music producer
- Marce (born 1974), Colombian singer-songwriter
- Marcela (born 1971), Mexican professional wrestler
- Marčelo (born 1983), Serbian hip-hop artist and lyricist
- Marcha (born 1956), Dutch singer and TV presenter
- Mareko (born 1981), New Zealand rapper
- Margaret (born 1991), Polish singer and songwriter
- Margo (1917–1985), Mexican-American actress
- Margo (born 1951), Irish singer
- marhy, Japanese singer-songwriter
- Maria (born 1982), Bulgarian pop-folk singer
- Maria (born 1987), Japanese singer and actress
- Maribelle (born 1960), Dutch singer
- Marie (1963–2006), American professional wrestler
- Marika (born 1980), Polish vocalist, songwriter and radio DJ
- Marilú (1927–2023), Mexican singer and actress
- Marilyn (born 1962), Jamaica-born British pop singer and songwriter
- Marina (born 1988), Spanish drag queen and film director
- Marinella (1938–2026), Greek singer
- Mario (1810–1883), Italian operatic tenor
- Marioo (born 1995), Tanzanian singer, songwriter and music producer
- Mariquita, Algerian-born French dancer
- Mariska (born 1979), Finnish rapper
- Marisol (born 1948), Spanish singer and actress
- Mariza (born 1973), Portuguese singer
- Marjo (born 1953), Canadian singer-songwriter
- Marka (born 1961), Belgian singer, songwriter, composer and film-maker
- Markiplier (born 1989), American YouTuber
- Markoolio (born 1975), Swedish-Finnish entertainer
- Markul (born 1993), Russian-born Latvian hip-hop-songwriter and singer
- Marky (born 1988), American rapper and hip-hop artist
- Marlayne (born 1971), Dutch singer and presenter
- Maro (born 1994), Portuguese singer and songwriter
- Marracash (born 1979), Italian rapper
- Mars, American drag queen and performance artist
- Mars (born 1954), Hong Kong actor, action director and stuntman
- Mars (born 1980), American rapper
- Marshmello (born 1992), American music producer and DJ
- Marteria (born 1982), German rapper
- Martika (born 1969), American singer-songwriter and actress
- Martirio (born 1958), Spanish singer
- Martse (1989–2022), Malawian rapper and songwriter
- Marty (born 1987), American rapper
- Marvaless (born 1975), American rapper
- Marz, American rapper
- Marzieh (1924–2010), Persian traditional singer
- Masada (born 1981), American wrestler
- Masakre (1954–2012), Mexican professional wrestler
- Masamune (born 1974), Japanese professional wrestler
- Mase (aka Ma$e) (born 1975), American rapper, songwriter and minister
- Masego (born 1993), Jamaican-American musician and singer
- Maseo (born 1970), American rapper
- Maska (born 1985), French rapper and dancer
- Maskal (born 1985), Malawian Afro-R&B singer
- Maskiri (born 1980), Zimbabwean rapper
- Massaka (born 1984), Turkish rapper and songwriter
- Massari (born 1980), Lebanese Canadian R&B singer
- Massiel (born 1947), Spanish singer
- Massiv (born 1982), German rapper
- Mastamind (born 1972), American rapper
- MatPat (born 1986), American YouTuber
- Mastana (1954–2011), Pakistani comedian and actor
- Masterkraft, Nigerian record producer, disc jockey, band director, pianist and songwriter
- Mastor (1928–2011), Indian musician, double bass player and trumpeter
- Mata (born 2000), Polish rapper, singer and songwriter
- Matador, Senegalese Hip Hop performer and dancer
- Mathematics (born 1971), American hip hop producer and DJ
- Matisyahu (born 1979), Jewish American reggae vocalist, beatboxer and alternative rock musician
- Matoma (born 1991), Norwegian DJ and record producer
- MatPat (born 1986), American internet personality and former YouTuber
- Matraka (born 1998), Mexican drag queen
- Matrang (born 1995), Russian musician, singer and rapper
- MattyBRaps (born 2003), American rapper, singer and YouTuber
- Matuê (born 1993), Brazilian rapper, singer, composer and guitarist
- Matutina (1946–2025), Filipino actress-comedienne and voice actress
- Maurane (1960–2018), Belgian singer and actress
- Mavado (born 1980), Jamaican musician and DJ
- Mawi (born 1981), Malaysian singer and TV celebrity
- Max (born 1988), South Korean singer-songwriter and occasional actor
- Maxi (born 1950), Irish DJ, actress and singer
- Maxie (born 1998), Filipino drag performer, actor and singer
- Maxim (born 1967), English electronic musician, vocalist and DJ
- Maximo (born 1980), Mexican wrestler
- Maxsta (born 1995), English grime MC
- Maxwell (born 1973), American singer-songwriter and producer
- May (born 1982), South Korean singer-songwriter
- Maya (born 1979), South Korean singer
- MayBee (born 1979), South Korean singer, lyricist, actress and radio presenter
- Mayoori (1983–2005), Indian actress
- Mayorkun (born 1994), Nigerian singer, songwriter and pianist
- Mayot (born 1999), Russian hip-hop singer
- Mbosso (born 1991), Tanzanian singer and songwriter
- MCA (1964–2012), American rapper, singer-songwriter, director and film distributor
- Mcenroe, Canadian hip hop musician
- McG (born 1970), American film producer and director
- McKay (born 1997), Nigerian rapper, singer, songwriter and record producer
- Meatball, American drag queen and performer
- Meatball (born 1970), American professional wrestler
- Mechatok (born 1998), German music producer and DJ
- Meck (born 1970), British DJ
- Meddy (born 1989), Rwandan singer and songwriter
- Medi (born 1994), Bulgarian singer, musician and producer
- Medikal (born 1994), Ghanaian hip hop musician
- Meechie, American singer
- MeeK (born 1971), Franco-English singer-songwriter
- Meenoi (born 1997), South Korean singer
- Meera (born 1977), Pakistani actress
- Meg (born 1980), Japanese singer-songwriter
- Megahertz, American record producer, composer and songwriter
- Megas (1945–2026), Icelandic singer-songwriter
- Megwin (born 1977), Japanese YouTuber and comedian
- Meiko (born 1982), American singer-songwriter
- Meja (born 1969), Swedish composer and singer
- Melcochita (born 1936), Peruvian comedian and singer
- Meleka, English singer and songwriter
- MELL (born 1976), Japanese singer-songwriter
- Melodownz, New Zealand MC and rapper
- Melody (born 1977), Belgian singer
- Melody (born 1982), Burmese actress and singer
- Melody (born 1990), Spanish singer
- Melody (born 2007), Brazilian singer
- Melymel (born 1988), Dominican rapper and actress
- Menaka (born 1963), Indian actress
- Ménélik (born 1970), French rapper
- Menny (born 1983), Mexican singer-songwriter
- Mephisto (born 1968), Mexican wrestler
- Mercedes (born 1978), American rapper and singer
- Merche (born 1974), Spanish singer
- Mercurio, Mexican professional wrestler
- Merkules, Canadian rapper
- Merlin, British rapper
- Mero (born 2000), German-Turkish rapper
- Merton, American musician and personality
- Merz (born 1967), English musician and singer-songwriter
- Mesquitinha (1902–1956), Portuguese-born Brazilian actor, comedian and director
- Messiah (born 1990), Dominican rapper and singer
- Mestizo (born 1981), American rapper
- Mesto (born 1999), Dutch electronic musician, DJ, record producer and remixer
- Metálico, Mexican professional wrestler
- Metis (born 1984), Japanese singer-songwriter
- Metro (born 1982), Mexican wrestler
- Mew (born 1999), Italian singer-songwriter
- Mez (born 1990), American rapper, producer and director
- MGK (born 1990), American rapper, singer, songwriter, producer and actor
- MHD (born 1994), French-Guinean rapper
- M.I.A. (born 1975), English rapper and singer
- Mia (born 1983), Lithuanian singer, songwriter and television host
- Miach (born 1998), Croatian singer and songwriter
- Mibbs, American hip hop recording artist
- Micachu (born 1987), English singer-songwriter and producer
- Michele (born 1944), Italian singer
- Michelle (born 1972), German singer
- MickDeth (1978–2013), American musician
- Micky (born 1943), Spanish singer
- Mico (born 2002), Filipino-Canadian singer-songwriter and musician
- Microdot (born 1993), South Korean–New Zealand rapper and singer
- Microman (born 1998), Mexican professional wrestler
- Mictlán (born 1982), Mexican wrestler
- Mida (born 1999), Italian-Venezuelan singer-songwriter
- Midajah (born 1970), American fitness model, professional wrestler and actress
- Midel, Argentine rapper and singer
- Mideon (born 1968), American chef and professional wrestler
- Midnight (born 1965), Jamaican-born American professional wrestler
- Midori (born 1968), American pornographic actress
- midwxst (born 2003), American singer and rapper
- Mie (born 1958), Japanese singer
- Mietta (born 1969), Italian singer and actress
- Miggy (1941–1971), Dutch pop singer
- Miguelito (born 1999), Puerto Rican reggaeton artist
- Mihiro (born 1982), Japanese actress, singer, television personality and adult video actress
- Miia (born 1997), Norwegian singer
- Miilkbone (born 1974), American rapper and songwriter
- Mija (born 1992), American DJ, music producer and promoter
- Mije (born 1969), Mexican professional wrestler
- Mika (born 1983), British singer
- Mike (born 1998), American rapper, songwriter and record producer
- Mikeyla, Swedish singer
- Mikha (born 2003), Filipino singer, rapper, actress and dancer
- miKKa (born 1982), Serbian musician
- Milan (1941–1971), Serbian-American musician
- Milck (born 1986), American singer-songwriter
- Milenita (born 1975), Bulgarian pop and jazz singer
- Milet, Japanese singer
- Miliki (1929–2012), Spanish clown, accordionist and singer
- Milk (born 1987), American drag performer
- Milkman (1989–2026), Mexican rapper, producer and composer
- Milli (born 2002), Thai rapper and singer
- Millie (1947–2020), Jamaican singer-songwriter
- Milow (born 1981), Belgian singer-songwriter
- Miltinho (1928–2014), Brazilian singer
- Milú (1926–2008), Portuguese actress and singer
- Milva (1939–2021), Italian singer, actress and TV personality
- Mim, British singer
- Mimicat (born 1984), Portuguese singer and songwriter
- Mimiks (born 1991), Swiss musician
- Mimosa (1960–2023), French humorous magician
- Min (born 1988), Vietnamese singer and dancer
- Mina (born 1993), German singer
- Minea (born 1977), Croatian pop singer and television presenter
- Minelli (born 1988), Romanian singer and songwriter
- Minimaks (1938–2005), Serbian radio and television personality
- Minmi (born 1974), Japanese musician, singer-songwriter and producer
- Minmini (born 1970), Indian singer
- Minnie (born 1997), Thai singer, songwriter, record producer and actress
- Mino (born 1993), South Korean rapper, singer-songwriter, music producer, and actor
- Minorita (born 1999), Japanese professional wrestler
- Minos (born 1983), South Korean rapper
- Minzy (born 1994), South Korean singer
- Miou-Miou (born 1950), French actress
- MIQ (born 1955), Japanese pop singer and vocal trainer
- Mira (born 1995), Romanian singer
- Miracle (born 1992), Ghanaian-Australian hip hop musician
- Mirage, American drag performer
- Mirai (1982–2005), Japanese professional wrestler
- Mirani (born 1996), South Korean rapper and songwriter
- Mirawas (1955–2025), Pakistani comedian and singer
- Miria, American singer-songwriter
- Miro (born 1985), Bulgarian professional wrestler
- Miryo (born 1981), South Korean rapper and songwriter
- Misha (born 1975), Slovak singer
- Misho (born 1984), Armenian rapper and actor
- Mísia (1955–2024), Portuguese singer
- MISIA (born 1978), Japanese singer-songwriter and musician
- MISSPSTAR (born 1994), American musician and actress
- MIST (born 1992), British rapper
- MistaJam (born 1983), British DJ and radio presenter
- Misterioso (born 1966), Mexican-American wrestler
- Místico (born 1982), Mexican wrestler
- Mistinguett (1875–1956), French singer
- Misua (1998–2026), Filipino drag performer
- Mitski (born 1990), Japanese-American singer
- Miúcha (1937–2018), Brazilian singer and composer
- miwa (born 1990), Japanese singer-songwriter, musician and radio DJ
- Miyavi (born 1981), Japanese entertainer
- Miz (born 1981), Japanese singer
- Mizchif (1976–2014), Zimbabwean-born South African rapper
- MJ (born 1994), South Korean singer and actor
- MK (born 1972), American DJ, record producer and remixer
- MLMA, South Korean rapper
- MNDR (born 1982), American singer, songwriter and record producer
- MNEK (born 1994), English singer, songwriter and record producer
- Mo (1967–2025), American professional wrestler
- MØ (born 1988), Danish singer, songwriter and record producer
- Moby (born 1965), American musician
- Mochakk (born 1999), Brazilian DJ and music producer
- Mocky (born 1974), Canadian musician, producer, songwriter and performer
- Moddi (born 1987), Norwegian musician
- Mo-Do (1966–2013), Italian musician
- Modulok (born 1979), Canadian rapper
- Moelogo (born 1990), British–Nigerian singer-songwriter
- Mogol (born 1936), Italian music lyricist
- MohBad (1996–2023), Nigerian rapper, singer and songwriter
- Mohini (born 1978), Indian actress
- MoJo (born 1952), Japanese singer and composer
- MOK (born 1976), German rapper
- Molière (1622–1673), French playwright and actor
- Momo (born 1974), Japanese singer-songwriter
- Momo (born 1979), Brazilian singer-songwriter, composer, multi-instrumentalist and producer
- Momus (born 1960), Scottish singer-songwriter
- Monaleo (born 2001), American rapper and singer-songwriter
- Monalisa (born 1982), Indian actress
- Moncho (born 1988), Swedish rapper, singer and songwriter
- Mondonguito (1959–2026), Peruvian comedian
- Monguito (d. 2006), Cuban singer
- Monica (born 1987), Indian actress
- Monice (born 1989), Bosnian-born Austrian pop singer
- Monifah (born 1972), American singer-songwriter
- Monski (born 1994), Kenyan hip hop rapper, singer and songwriter
- Monster (born 1976), Taiwanese guitarist
- Montéhus (1872–1952), French singer-songwriter
- Montrouge (1825–1903), a comic actor in French musical theatre
- Monty (born 1990), American rapper
- Moodymann, American musician
- Mooki (born 1975), Israeli singer-songwriter, musician and rapper
- MOOMIN (born 1972), Japanese reggae artist
- Moon (born 1991), Swiss Romani drag performer
- Moondog (1916–1999), American composer, musician and performer
- Moony (born 1980), Italian musician
- Moos (born 1974), French singer
- Moose (born 1984), American professional wrestler
- Mooski, American rapper and singer
- Moozlie (born 1992), South African rapper and television presenter
- Morena (born 1984), Maltese singer
- Morgan (born 1972), Italian singer and musician
- Morgane (born 1975), Belgian singer
- Moroccoblu (born 1979), Mexican singer-songwriter
- Morray (born 1992), American rapper and singer-songwriter
- Morris (born 1976), Romanian singer and DJ
- Mosh (born 1971), American wrestler
- MoSS, Canadian record producer
- MoStack (born 1994), British rapper and singer
- Mot (born 1990), Russian musician and singer
- Motez, Australian record producer, musician, installation artist and DJ
- Moti (born 1987), Dutch electro house DJ and music producer
- Motiv8, British electronic dance music producer, songwriter, remixer and sound engineer
- MoTrip (born 1988), German rapper
- Mounqup (born 1986), French-Galician singer-songwriter
- Moustache (1929–1987), French actor and musician
- Movita (1916–2015), American actress
- Mozella (born 1981), American singer-songwriter
- Mozez, Jamaican-born English singer-songwriter
- Mozzik (born 1995), Kosovo-Albanian rapper and singer
- Mozzy (born 1987), American rapper
- Mpura (1995–2021), South African rapper and record producer
- mrld (born 2005), Filipino singer and songwriter
- Mrshll, Korean-American R&B and K-pop singer
- MsChif (born 1976), American professional wrestler
- Mugihito (born 1944), Japanese voice actor
- Mugison (born 1976), Icelandic musician
- Multibronce (born 1998), Mexican professional wrestler
- Mulú, Brazilian DJ and music producer
- Mumuzinho (born 1983), Brazilian singer, composer and actor
- Muna (born 1987), Nigerian hip hop artist and model
- Mundy (born 1975), Irish singer-songwriter
- Muneshine, Canadian recording artist, record producer, DJ, mix engineer and performer
- Murali (1954–2009), Indian actor and author
- Murcof (born 1970), Mexican musician and record producer
- Murda (born 1984), Turkish-Dutch rapper and songwriter
- Murphy (born 1988), Australian wrestler
- Murs (born 1978), American rapper
- Musashi (born 1990), Japanese professional wrestler
- Muscles (born 1986/1987), Australian electronica musician
- Mushvenom (born 1994), South Korean rapper
- Musidora (1889–1957), French actress
- Musiko (born 1990), Puerto Rican producer and composer
- Muska (born 1952), Finnish singer
- Muslim (born 1981), Moroccan rapper
- Mussum (1941–1994), Brazilian actor and musician
- Mustard (born 1990), American record producer
- Mutabaruka (born 1952), Jamaican musician, actor and talk-show host
- Muxu (born 1990), Maltese singer and songwriter
- Muzi (born 1991), South African musician and record producer
- mxmtoon (born 2000), American singer-songwriter and YouTuber
- Myco (born 1979), Japanese singer, voice actress and radio personality
- Myra (born 1986), American singer
- Mystic (born 1974), American hip hop artist
- Mystikal (born 1970), American rapper and actor
- Myzery, Puerto Rican rapper
- Myztiko (born 1988), Canadian reggaeton producer

== N ==
- N (born 1990), South Korean singer, actor, presenter and radio host
- Näääk (born 1983), Swedish singer and rapper
- Naama (born 1934), Tunisian singer
- Naâman (1990–2025), French reggae singer and musician
- Nach (born 1974), Spanish rapper and actor
- Nacho (born 1983), Venezuelan singer
- Nada (born 1991), South Korean rapper and singer
- Nadeem (born 1941), Indian-born Pakistani actor
- Nadhiya (born 1966), Indian actress
- Nadira (1968–1995), Pakistani actress and dancer
- Nadiuska (born 1952), German model and actress
- Nâdiya (born 1973), French singer
- Naëla, Colombian singer and songwriter
- Naezy (born 1993), Indian rapper
- Nafla (born 1992), South Korean rapper
- Nagesh (1933–2009), Indian comedian and actor
- Naghma (born 1964), Afghan singer
- Nagma (born 1974), Indian actress
- Naiboi, Kenyan singer, songwriter, rapper and record producer
- Nailz (born 1958), American professional wrestler
- Naina (1971–1996), Pakistani actress and model
- Najee (born 1957), American jazz saxophonist and flautist
- Naldo, Puerto Rican singer-songwriter and producer
- Naledge (born 1983), American rapper
- Namewee (born 1983), Malaysian hip hop recording artist, composer, filmmaker and actor
- Namika (born 1991), German singer and rapper
- Nana (born 1983), Malaysian DJ, singer and actress
- Nana (born 1991), South Korean singer, actress and model
- Nana (born 2001), South Korean singer, actress and dancer
- Nanami (born 2006), Japanese professional wrestler
- Nanda (1939–2014), Indian actress
- Nandana (born 1985), Indian actress
- Nandy (born 1992), Tanzanian singer, songwriter and actress
- nano (born 1988), Japanese-American singer and lyricist
- Nao (born 1987), English singer-songwriter and record producer
- Naomi (born 1987), American professional wrestler, actress, model, dancer and singer
- Napoleon (born 1963), Indian actor
- Napoleon (born 1977), American rapper and motivational speaker
- Naps (born 1986), French rapper
- Narain (born 1979), Indian actor
- Narcy (born 1982), Iraqi-Canadian rapper and actor
- Narqath (born 1979), Finnish musician and singer-songwriter
- Nargis (1929–1981), Indian actress
- Nargis (born 1974), Pakistani actress
- Narsha (born 1981), South Korean singer and dancer
- Nas (born 1973), American rapper
- Nashad (1923–1981), Pakistani-Indian composer and music producer
- Nasi (born 1962), Brazilian singer-songwriter, bassist, actor, record producer, radialist, TV presenter and disc jockey
- Naska (born 1997), Italian singer-songwriter
- Nassar (born 1958), Indian actor, producer, director, lyricist and singer
- Nassi, Moroccan-born French singer-songwriter
- Nasubi (born 1975), Japanese comedian and media personality
- Natalise (born 1985), American singer-songwriter
- Natalya (born 1982), Canadian female wrestler
- Natsupoi (born 1995), Japanese professional wrestler and singer
- Nattan (born 1998), Brazilian singer and songwriter
- Nattefrost, Norwegian musician
- Natty (born 2002), Thai singer
- Nature (born 1972), American rapper
- NAV (born 1989), Canadian rapper
- Navio (born 1983), Ugandan rapper and record producer
- Nawal (born 1965), Comorian musician
- Nayanthara (born 1984), Indian actress
- Nayt (born 1994), Italian rapper
- Naza (born 1993), French rapper and singer of Congolese origin
- Nazar (born 1984), Austrian rapper
- Nazima (1948–2025), Indian actress
- N'Dambi (born 1970), American singer
- Necro (born 1976), American rapper, producer, actor and director
- Necrobutcher (born 1968), Norwegian musician
- Needlz (born 1978), American hip hop producer and composer
- Neeli (born 1961), Pakistani actress
- Neffa (born 1967), Italian singer, songwriter, rapper and record producer
- Negativ (born 1982), Dutch rapper, actor and radio broadcaster
- Neguitão, Brazilian singer
- Nehellenia, Italian drag performer
- Neisha (born 1982), Slovenian pianist and singer
- Neja (born 1972), Italian singer
- Nek (born 1972), Italian singer-songwriter
- Nekfeu (born 1990), French-Greek rapper, actor and record producer
- Nelly (born 1974), American rapper
- Nely (born 1987), Puerto Rican reggaeton producer
- Nemo (born 1999), Swiss singer and rapper
- Nemzzz (born 2004), British rapper
- Nena (born 1960), German singer and actress
- Nenny (born 2002), Portuguese singer-songwriter and rapper
- Neon, American-based dancer and choreographer
- Neón, Mexican professional wrestler
- Népal (1990–2019), French rapper and beatmaker
- Nerdkween, American singer-songwriter
- Nergal (born 1977), Polish musician
- Nerone (born 1991), Italian rapper
- Neshe (born 1990), Turkish singer, songwriter, actress and dancer
- Nesli, Italian rapper and producer
- Nessbeal (born 1978), French rapper
- Nessly (born 1995), American rapper
- Nesty (born 1973), Puerto Rican reggaeton producer
- Netinho (1966–2026), Brazilian singer and composer
- Netsky (born 1989), Belgian drum and bass producer and musician
- Nettspend (born 2007), American rapper and songwriter
- Nevaeh (born 1986), American wrestler
- Neville (born 1986), English wrestler
- Newkid (born 1990), Swedish-Filipino rapper
- Newton (born 1967), English singer
- Ne-Yo (born 1979), American singer, songwriter, actor, dancer and record producer
- NF (born 1991), American rapper, singer, songwriter and record producer
- Nghtmre (born 1990), American DJ and electronic dance music producer
- Niagara, American musician
- Niarn (born 1979), Danish rapper
- Nicki (born 1966), German singer and composer
- Nico (1938–1988), German model and singer-songwriter
- Nico (born 1970), Romanian singer
- Nicolay (born 1974), Dutch hip hop musician
- Nicole (born 1977), Chilean singer
- Niel (born 1994), South Korean singer, songwriter and actor
- Niello, Swedish rapper and electronic hip hop artist
- Nielson (born 1989), Dutch singer-songwriter
- Niggo (born 1972), Pakistani dancer and actor
- Niki (born 1999), Indonesian singer-songwriter
- Nikki, Japanese-born American musician
- Nikki (born 1985), Malaysian American singer
- Niklas (born 1983), Danish singer-songwriter
- Niletto (born 1991), Russian singer and dancer
- Nimmi (1933–2020), Indian actress
- Nimo (born 1995), German rapper
- Nina (born 1966), Spanish singer and actress
- Ninajirachi (born 1999), Australian electronic DJ and producer
- Nine (born 1969), American rapper
- Nines (born 1990), English rapper
- Ninezero, Australian singer-songwriter and musician
- Ningning (born 2002), Chinese-South Korean singer
- Ninho (born 1996), French-Congolese rapper
- Ninja (born 1983), English rapper
- Ninja (born 1991), Indian playback singer and actor
- Nino (born 1981), Greek singer-songwriter and musician
- Nirala (1937–1990), Pakistani comedian
- Niro (born 1987), French-Moroccan rapper
- Niska (born 1994), French rapper
- Nitro (born 1967), Mexican wrestler
- Nitro (born 1993), Italian rapper
- Nitti (born 1975), American record producer
- Nitty (born 1977), American rapper
- NIve (born 1993), South Korean singer-songwriter, producer and composer
- Niyi, British MC and singer
- Niyola (born 1985), Nigerian singer, songwriter, performing artist and actress
- NK (born 1987), Ukrainian singer, actress and television personality
- Noa (born 1969), Israeli singer
- NoB (1964–2025), Japanese singer
- Nobody (born 1977), American hip hop producer
- Nocando (born 1983), American rapper
- NoCap (born 1998), American rapper and singer
- NoClue (born 1985), American rapper
- Node (born 1990), Danish singer and hip hop artist
- NOE (born 1975), American hip hop recording artist
- Noel (born 2000), South Korean rapper
- Noemi (born 1982), Italian singer
- Noisecontrollers (born 1980), Dutch DJ and music producer
- Noizy (born 1986), Albanian rapper
- Nokko (born 1963), Japanese singer-songwriter
- Noko (born 1962), English musician, composer and producer
- NoLay, British rapper
- Noname (born 1991), American rapper and record producer
- Nonchalant (born 1973), American singer, rapper and songwriter
- Nonini (born 1982), Kenyan rapper and radio presenter
- Nonô (born 1997), Brazilian musician
- Noodles (born 1963), American guitarist
- Noor (born 1977), Pakistani actress and model
- Norazia, Indonesian musician
- Nores (born 1979), Moroccan rapper and music producer
- Noriel, Puerto Rican rapper, singer and songwriter
- Nornagest (born 1977), Belgian singer and musician
- NorthSideBenji (born 1998), Canadian rapper and musician
- Nosferatu (born 1979), Mexican professional wrestler
- Notch (born 1973), American R&B, reggae, dancehall and reggaeton artist
- Nottz (born 1977), American hip hop producer and rapper
- Nour (born 1973), Lebanese actress
- Nourhanne (born 1977), Lebanese singer
- Novel (born 1981), American hip hop artist
- Novelist (born 1997), British grime MC and record producer
- Novulent, American musician, songwriter and vocalist
- Noztra (born 1983), Dominican-born American musician
- Nqrse (born 1995), Japanese rapper, songwriter and vocalist
- Nublu (born 1996), Estonian rapper
- Nucci (born 1996), Serbian rapper and songwriter
- Nucentz (born 1987), Irish rapper
- Nucha (born 1966), Portuguese singer
- Nucksal (born 1987), South Korean rapper
- Nujabes (1974–2010), Japanese hip hop producer and DJ
- Nunu (born 1998), Israeli singer
- Nunzio (born 1972), American professional wrestler
- Nyashinski (born 1981), Kenyan rapper, singer and songwriter
- Nygma (born 1974), Mexican wrestler
- Nyla (born 1983), Jamaican singer
- NYOIL (born 1971), American emcee
- nZo (born 1986), American rapper and wrestler

== O ==
- Obama, Italian drag performer
- Oboy (born 1997), French rapper
- Obrafour, Ghanaian hiplife musician and rapper
- Octagón (born 1961), Mexican wrestler
- Octagoncito (born 1972), Mexican wrestler
- Octahvia, American singer
- October (born 1997), New Zealand singer, songwriter, record producer and model
- ODB (born 1978), American professional wrestler and actress
- Oddisee (born 1985), American-Sudanese rapper and record producer
- Odetari, American singer, rapper, songwriter and record producer
- Odoguiinha (born 2005), Brazilian actor and singer
- Odumodublvck (born 1993), Nigerian rapper, singer and songwriter
- Offica (born 2000), Irish rapper
- Offset (born 1991), American rapper
- Oforia (born 1971), Israeli electronic music artist and music producer
- Ogeday (born 1981), Turkish rap singer
- Ohene, American multi-instrumentalist and record producer
- OhGeesy (born 1993), American rapper
- Okasian (born 1987), Korean-American rapper and singer
- Oki (born 1998), Polish rapper, singer and songwriter
- Oklou (born 1993), French musician
- Okmalumkoolkat (born 1983), South African rapper
- Olímpico (born 1965), Mexican wrestler
- Oliver (1945–2000), American singer
- Ollie (born 1993), Estonian singer, songwriter, guitarist and record producer
- Olltii (born 1996), South Korean rapper
- Olly (born 2001), Italian rapper and singer
- Omarion (born 1984), American singer-songwriter, actor, dancer and producer
- Omega (born 1979), Dominican singer and songwriter
- Omen (1976–2025), American record producer
- Omen (born 1982), American rapper and record producer
- Omi (born 1986), Jamaican singer
- Omnionn, Salvadoran music producer
- Omos (born 1994), Nigerian-American wrestler
- Onar (born 1982), Polish rapper
- One (born 1994), South Korean rapper, singer-songwriter and actor
- Oneman (born 1986), English DJ and producer
- Onew (born 1989), South Korean singer, dancer, lyricist, presenter, radio host, MC and promotional model
- Ongina (born 1982), Filipino-American drag performer
- Onision (born 1985), American YouTuber and musician
- Onryo (born 1971), Japanese professional wrestler
- Onyx, American wrestler
- Onyx, Spanish drag queen and multidisciplinary artist
- Ookay (born 1992), American music producer, DJ and singer
- Oompa (born 1991), American rapper and vocalist
- Opanka, Ghanaian rapper and performer
- Opaque (born 1976), Norwegian rapper
- Opāru, American actress, singer and composer
- Ophidian, American professional wrestler
- Opie, American radio personality
- Optamus, Australian MC
- Orelsan (born 1982), French hip hop and rap artist
- Organik (born 1988), Canadian rapper
- Organzza, Brazilian drag performer and visual artist
- Origa (1970–2015), Russian Japanese singer
- Oro (1971–1993), Mexican professional wrestler
- Oruam (born 2001), Brazilian rapper, singer and songwriter
- OsamaSon (born 2003), American rapper, songwriter and record producer
- Oscarito (1906–1970), Brazilian actor and comedian
- Osez, Swiss rapper and dancer
- Osh (born 1995), English singer and rapper
- Oskido (born 1967), South African recording artist, DJ and record producer
- OSN (born 1997), Taiwanese rapper and singer
- Otis (born 1991), American wrestler
- Outasight (born 1983), American singer-songwriter and rapper
- Outsider (born 1983), South Korean rapper
- Ovidie (born 1980), French director, producer and pornographic actress
- Öwnboss, Brazilian music producer and DJ
- Owodog (born 1982), Taiwanese singer, actor and film director
- Oxlade (born 1997), Nigerian singer and songwriter
- Oxxxymiron (born 1985), Russian hip-hop artist
- Ozbi (born 1986), Turkish rapper and songwriter
- Ozols (born 1979), Latvian rapper and record producer
- Ozuna (born 1992), Puerto Rican singer and rapper

== P ==
- Pablo (born 1994), Filipino singer, rapper, dancer, songwriter and producer
- Pac (1986–2026), English professional wrestler
- Pacewon (born 1974), American rapper and producer
- Pacifico (born 1964), Italian singer-songwriter and composer
- PackFM (born 1977), American hip hop artist and producer
- Paenda (born 1988), Austrian singer, songwriter and music producer
- Pagano (born 1986), Mexican professional wrestler
- Paige (born 1992), English wrestler
- Pakita (born 1993), Spanish drag performer
- Paky (born 1999), Italian rapper
- Pale (born 1976), Russian rap artist
- Paleface (born 1978), Finnish hip hop musician
- Palito (1934–2010), Filipino actor
- Paloalto (born 1984), South Korean rapper and singer
- Paloma (born 1991), French drag performer, singer, director and screenwriter
- Pampidoo, Jamaican musician, songwriter and DJ
- Panaiotis, American vocalist and composer
- Panda (born 1986), Dutch electronic music artist
- Pandora (born 1970), Swedish eurodance artist
- Pantera (born 1964), Mexican professional wrestler
- Panti (born 1968), Irish performer
- Paperboy (born 1969), American rapper
- Papon (born 1975), Indian playback singer and composer
- Papoose (born 1978), American rapper
- Paradime (born 1974), American hip hop singer and musician
- Paraluman (1923–2009), Filipino actress
- Parannoul (born 2001), South Korean shoegaze musician
- Parasto (born 1954), Afghan singer
- Paris (born 1967), American hip hop artist
- Parisa (born 1950), Iranian singer and musician
- Parrerito (1953–2020), Brazilian singer
- PartyNextDoor (born 1993), Canadian rapper, singer, songwriter and record producer
- Pashanim (born 2000), German rapper and filmmaker
- Passenger (born 1984), British singer-songwriter and indie pop/folk/rock singer
- Passi (born 1972), French hip hop artist
- Passion (born 1996), American rapper
- Pata (born 1965), Japanese musician and songwriter
- Patachou (1918–2015), French singer
- Patapaa (born 1990), Ghananaian musician and songwriter
- Patoranking (born 1990), Nigerian singer and songwriter
- Patra (born 1972), Jamaican singer
- Patron (born 1988), Turkish rapper and songwriter
- Paulini (born 1982), Fijian-born Australian singer-songwriter and actress
- PdotO (born 1985), South African rapper and songwriter
- P.E.A.C.E. (1974–2025), American rapper
- Peaches (born 1966), Canadian musician
- Peakboy (born 1989), South Korean rapper, record producer and singer-songwriter
- Pearl (born 1990), American drag performer and record producer
- Pebbles (born 1964), American singer, songwriter and producer
- Peco (born 1995), Japanese model, television personality and singer
- Pedropiedra (born 1978), Chilean musician and composer
- Peekaboo (born 1995), American producer
- Pegasso (born 1978), Mexican wrestler
- Pegz (born 1975), Australian hip hop artist and producer
- Peirol, French composer
- Peja (born 1976), Polish rap musician, songwriter and producer
- Pelé (1940–2022), Brazilian footballer, occasional actor and singer-songwriter
- Penomeco (born 1992), South Korean rapper and singer-songwriter
- Pepa, Jamaican-American rapper
- Pepenazi (born 1988), Nigerian singer and songwriter
- Pepita (born 1983), Brazilian singer, songwriter, actress and dancer
- Peppermint (born 1979), American actress, singer, songwriter, television personality and drag queen
- Perdigon, French composer
- Peret (1935–2014), Spanish singer, musician and composer
- Perfect (born 1980), Jamaican singer
- Perla, Canadian drag performer
- Perla (born 1952), Paraguayan-Brazilian singer
- Perlla (born 1988), Brazilian singer
- Pérotin, French composer
- Peruzzi (born 1989), Nigerian singer
- Pest (born 1975), Norwegian black metal vocalist
- Peter (born 1952), Japanese singer, dancer and actor
- Petit (born 2005), Italian singer-songwriter
- Pettidee (born 1973), American record producer, actor and Christian rap artist
- PewDiePie (born 1989), Swedish web-based comedian and producer
- Peyo (1928–1992), Belgian illustrator and creator of the Smurfs
- Pez (born 1984), Australian hip hop recording artist
- Pezet (born 1980), Polish rapper
- Phanatik (born 1976), American rapper
- Pháo (born 2003), Vietnamese rapper and producer
- Pharaoh (born 1996), Russian rapper
- Phashara (born 1974), American rapper
- Phatt, Dutch singer, songwriter and producer
- Pheelz (born 1994), Nigerian record producer, singer and songwriter
- Phesto (born 1974), American rapper and producer
- Phew (born 1959), Japanese singer
- Phinesse, Australian urban music artist
- Phoenix, American drag performer
- Phora (born 1994), American rapper
- Photek (born 1971), British disc jockey and record producer
- Phranc (born 1952), American singer-songwriter
- Phrase (born 1981), Australian hip hop MC
- phreshboyswag, British rapper and record producer
- Phresher (born 1989), American rapper
- Phyno (born 1986), Nigerian rapper and record producer
- Phyzix (born 1983), Malawian musician, rapper and songwriter
- Pianoman, British dance music producer
- Piche, French drag performer
- Pictureplane (born 1985), American electronic musician and visual artist
- Picudo (1967–2018), Mexican professional wrestler
- Pierrot (born 1969), Hungarian singer-songwriter, music producer and game designer
- Pierrothito (born 1967), Mexican wrestler
- Pijuán (1942–2018), Puerto Rican musician
- Pikahsso (born 1970), American hip hop artist
- Pikotaro (born 1973), Japanese entertainer and comedian
- Piksy (born 1986), Malawian musician
- Pile (born 1988), Japanese singer and actress
- Pill (born 1986), American rapper
- Pinchers (born 1965), Jamaican singer
- Pinchface, American drummer
- Pinduca (born 1937), Brazilian singer and songwriter
- Pink (born 1979), American singer-songwriter
- PinkPantheress (born 2001), English singer and record producer
- Piotta (born 1974), Italian hip hop musician
- Piri (born 1999), English musician
- Piruka (born 1993), Portuguese rapper
- PistePiste, Finnish musician
- Pitbull (born 1981), American rapper
- Pitita (born 1995), Spanish drag performer
- Pitof (born 1957), French film director
- Pitty (born 1977), Brazilian singer
- Pixey (born 1995), English singer-songwriter, multi-instrumentalist and producer
- Pixinguinha (1897–1973), Brazilian composer and musician
- PK (born 1989), Estonian musician
- Planetary (born 1978), American underground rapper
- Planningtorock (born 1972), English electronic musician and record producer
- PlaqueBoyMax (born 2003), American record producer and rapper
- Plasma (born 1998), American drag performer, actor and singer
- Plastician (born 1982), British electronic musician
- Playalitical (1982–2020), American rapper
- Plies (born 1976), American rapper
- Pliers (born 1963), Jamaican Reggae singer
- PLK, acronym for Polak (born 1997), French rapper of mixed Polish and Corsican origin
- Plumb (born 1975), American musician
- Plutónio (born 1985), Portuguese rapper and hip-hop singer
- PMD (born 1968), American rapper
- PNC, New Zealand hip hop artist and rapper
- Pocah (born 1994), Brazilian singer-songwriter
- Poe (born 1968), American singer-songwriter
- Pogo (born 1988), South African-Australian musician
- Pokwang (born 1970), Filipino comedian and dramatic actress
- Polaire (1874–1939), Algerian-born French singer and actress
- Poldowski (1879–1932), Belgian-born British composer and pianist
- Pole (born 1967), German electronic music artist
- Pollyfilla (born 1978), New Zealand performer
- Pólvora (born 1979), Mexican wrestler
- Pomme (born 1996), French singer, songwriter and musician
- Ponvannan (born 1964), Indian actor and director
- Pooh (born 1974), Filipino comedian
- Pooh-Man (born 1969), American rapper
- Pooran (1934–1990), Iranian pop and classical singer
- Poorna, Indian actress and model
- Poornima (born 1960), Indian playback singer
- Poorstacy (1999–2025), American musician
- Popcaan (born 1988), Jamaican DJ
- Popek (born 1978), Polish rapper and professional mixed martial arts fighter
- Pope.L (1955–2023), American visual artist
- Poppy (born 1995), American singer-songwriter
- Porta (born 1988), Spanish rap singer
- Potap (born 1981), Ukrainian singer, rapper, songwriter, and producer
- Powfu (born 1999), Canadian rapper, singer, songwriter and record producer
- ppcocaine (born 2001), American social media personality and rapper
- Praiz (born 1995), Nigerian singer, songwriter and producer
- Pras (born 1972), American rapper
- Precious (born 1955), Canadian professional wrestler
- Predikador (born 1983), Panamanian producer
- Preme (born 1986), Canadian rapper, singer, songwriter and record producer
- Premji (1908–1998), Indian actor
- Pressa (born 1986), Canadian rapper and singer
- Presto (1992–2024), German rapper
- Prettifun (born 2005), American rapper, singer, record producer and songwriter
- Prevail (born 1975), Canadian hip hop artist
- Primary (born 1983), South Korean hip hop musician and record producer
- Princess (born 1961), British singer
- Princessa, American rapper and singer
- Priscilla (born 1976), Italian drag performer
- Priestess (born 1996), Italian rapper
- Priyamani (born 1984), Indian actress and model
- Priyanka (born 1991), Canadian singer, television personality and drag queen
- Problem (born 1987), American rapper, songwriter and record producer
- Prodigy (1974–2017), American rapper
- Produkt (born 1986), Puerto Rican rapper and songwriter
- Prof (born 1984), American rapper, singer and producer
- Professor (born 1978), South African musician
- ProfJam (born 1991), Portuguese rapper and hip hop singer
- Projota (born 1986), Brazilian rapper, composer and actor
- Prolyphic (born 1981), American hip hop musician
- Promoe (born 1976), Swedish rapper
- Propaganda (born 1979), American Christian rapper and spoken word
- Proof (1973–2006), American rapper
- Protofuse (born 1976), French electronic musician
- Prozak (born 1977), American independent rapper and film director
- Psarantonis (born 1937), Greek singer-songwriter and musician
- PSD, American rapper and producer
- Psicosis (born 1971), Mexican wrestler
- Psy (born 1977), South Korean entertainer
- Psycho, Japanese professional wrestler
- Psychosiz (born 1984), American rapper
- PsychoYP (born 1998), Nigerian alternative hip hop rapper, singer and songwriter
- Ptaha (born 1981), Russian hip hop artist
- Ptazeta, Spanish rapper and singer
- Pudgy (1946–2007), American comedian
- Pugo (1910–1978), Filipino actor, comedian, director and vaudevillian
- Pulsedriver (born 1974), German DJ and producer
- Pumpkinhead (1975–2015), American rapper and hip hop artist
- Punani, French drag performer
- Punch, American rapper, songwriter and record producer
- Punch (born 1993), South Korean singer
- Punchnello (born 1997), South Korean rapper
- Puntillita (1921–2000), Cuban singer
- Pupo (born 1955), Italian singer and lyricist
- Purified (born 1985), South African Christian hip hop artist
- Pushead, American artist and writer
- Pushim (born 1975), Japanese reggae artist
- Pusho (born 1989), Puerto Rican rapper
- PutoMikel (born 1991), Spanish drag artist
- Puzzle, British-Brazilian singer-songwriter
- Pvrx (born 1994), Canadian rapper, singer and songwriter
- Pycard, European composer
- Pyhimys (born 1981), Finnish rapper and songwriter
- Pyranja (born 1978), German rapper
- Pythia (born 1994), Greek-Canadian drag performer
- Pyti (born 1995), Belarusian musician, composer and producer

== Q ==
- Q (born 1996), American drag performer
- Quadeca (born 2000), American rapper, singer-songwriter, record producer and YouTuber
- QBoy (born 1978), British rapper, producer, DJ, writer and presenter
- Qdot, Nigerian musician and songwriter
- Qri (born 1986), South Korean singer, actress and model
- QT (born 1988), American singer and performance artist
- Q-Tip (born 1970), American rapper, record producer, singer and DJ
- Quavo (born 1991), American rapper, singer and producer
- Quebonafide (born 1991), Polish rapper, singer and songwriter
- Quest (born 1982), Filipino singer, rapper and songwriter
- Questlove (born 1971), American drummer, DJ and record producer
- Quicksilver (born 1983), American wrestler
- Quino (1932–2020), Argentine cartoonist
- Quintino (born 1985), Dutch DJ and record producer
- Qwazaar, American hip hop rapper
- Qwel (born 1980), American underground rapper and author
- Qwote, Haitian American singer-songwriter; club, pop, R&B, electronic and urban artist

== R ==
- Raaghav (born 1974), Indian actor
- Raappana, Finnish reggae artist
- RAC (born 1985), American musician and record producer
- Radha (born 1965), Indian actress
- Radioinactive, American rapper
- Radůza (born 1973), Czech singer and accordionist
- Radži (born 1987), Lithuanian pop singer
- Raekwon (born 1970), American rapper
- Rael (born 1983), Brazilian singer, composer and rapper
- RaeLynn (born 1994), American singer and songwriter
- Raf (born 1959), Italian singer-songwriter
- Raftaar (born 1988), Indian rapper, lyricist, dancer, actor, TV personality and music composer
- Rahim (born 1978), Polish rapper and producer
- Rahzel (born 1964), American hip-hop artist
- Raiden (born 1987), South Korean DJ and record producer
- Raimu (1883–1946), French actor
- Rain (born 1981), American professional wrestler
- Rain (born 1982), South Korean entertainer
- Raina (born 1989), South Korean singer
- Raiven (born 1996), Slovenian singer, songwriter and harpist
- Rajasulochana (1935–2013), Indian dancer and actress
- Rajinikanth (born 1950), Indian actor
- Rajkiran (born 1949), Indian actor, producer and director
- Rajkumar (1929–2006), Indian actor and singer
- Rakby (born 1989), Slovak rapper
- Rakim (born 1968), American rapper
- Raku (born 1997), Japanese professional wrestler
- Ralo (born 1995), American rapper
- Ramarajan (born 1954), Indian actor
- Ramba (born 1967), Italian pornographic actress
- Rambha (born 1976), Indian actress
- Ramengvrl (born 1992), Indonesian rapper
- Ramez (born 1978), French rap artist
- Rammellzee (1960–2010), American performance artist and hip-hop musician
- Ramona (1909–1972), American singer and pianist
- Rampage (born 1974), American rapper
- Ramstein (born 1974), Mexican professional wrestler
- Ramya (born 1982), Indian actress
- Ramz (born 1997), British rapper, singer and songwriter
- Rancore (born 1989), Italian rapper
- Random (born 2001), Italian rapper and singer
- Ranjan (1918–1983), Indian actor and singer
- Raphael (born 1943), Spanish singer and actor
- Rapman (born 1989), British rapper, record producer, screenwriter and film director
- Rapsody (born 1983), American rapper
- Raptile (born 1976), German rapper, producer and songwriter
- Raquel (born 1986), Brazilian professional wrestler and fitness model
- Rasco (born 1970), American rapper
- Rasel (born 1981), Spanish singer
- Rashid (born 1988), Brazilian rapper and producer
- Rasta (born 1963), American football player and actor
- Rasta (born 1989), Serbian rapper, singer, songwriter and producer
- Ratinho (born 1956), Brazilian television presenter, comedian and radio personality
- RationaL, Canadian rapper
- Rationale (born 1984), Zimbabwe-born British singer and songwriter
- Ratsy (born 1994), American folk singer-songwriter
- Raven (born 1964), American wrestler and occasional actor
- Raven (born 1979), American performer and TV personality
- Ravi (born 1976), Norwegian artist, musician, vocalist, composer, journalist
- Ravi (born 1993), South Korean rapper, singer, songwriter and record producer
- Ravichandran (1942–2011), Tamil actor
- Raxstar (born 1983), British rapper and singer
- Ray (1982–2018), Hong Kong professional wrestler
- Ray (born 1990), Japanese singer and radio personality
- Rayden (born 1985), Spanish rapper
- Raye (born 1997), English singer and songwriter
- Raylene (born 1977), American pornographic actress
- Raymzter (born 1979), Dutch rapper
- Rayvanny (born 1993), Tanzanian musician
- Rayvon (born 1968), Barbadian singer
- Raziel (1973–2022), Mexican wrestler
- Razzle (1960–1984), British drummer
- RBX (born 1967), American rapper
- Reanimator, American alternative hip hop producer
- Reason, American rapper and songwriter
- Reason, South African rapper
- Reason (born 1972), Australian hip hop artist
- Rebel (born 1978), American professional wrestler, model, actress and dancer
- Rebstar (born 1988), Swedish rapper
- Reconcile (born 1989), American hip hop recording artist
- Reddy (born 1985), South Korean rapper and singer
- Redfoo (born 1975), American rapper, singer-songwriter, record producer, actor and DJ
- Redinho, English multi-instrumentalist, vocalist and producer
- Redlight (born 1980), British DJ and music producer
- Redman (born 1970), American rapper, producer and actor
- RedOne (born 1972), Moroccan-Swedish-American producer, songwriter and music executive
- Redrama (born 1977), Finnish rapper
- Redsan (born 1981), Kenyan musician
- Redzz (born 1987), English rapper, record producer, singer, songwriter, actor and DJ
- Regard (born 1993), Kosovo-Albanian DJ and producer
- Reggie (born 1993), American professional wrestler and acrobat
- Regina (born 1965), Slovenian singer
- Reiley (born 1997), Faroese singer and social media influencer
- Reina (born 1975), American singer-songwriter
- Reita (1981–2024), Japanese bassist and composer
- Rekha (born 1954), Malayalam film actress
- Rekha (born 1970), Indian Tamil actress
- Reks (born 1977), American rapper
- Relámpago (born 1981), Mexican professional wrestler
- Rell (born 1976), American singer and songwriter
- Rema (born 2000), Nigerian rapper, singer and songwriter
- Remady (born 1977), Swiss music producer
- Remedy (born 1972), American emcee and hip hop producer
- Reminisce (born 1981), Nigerian singer, rapper, songwriter and actor
- Ren (born 1995), South Korean singer, actor and television personality
- renforshort (born 2002), Canadian singer and songwriter
- Reno (born 1969), American professional wrestler and tap dancer
- Reol (born 1993), Japanese singer, songwriter, rapper and record producer
- Reona (born 1998), Japanese singer
- Res (born 1978), American singer
- Resh (born 1976), Malaysian singer-songwriter
- Resham (born 1975), Pakistani actress
- Reshma (1947–2013), Pakistani singer
- Residente (born 1978), Puerto Rican rapper, singer, songwriter and filmmaker
- Retta (born 1970), American actress and stand-up comedian
- Revathi (born 1966), Indian actress and director
- Rêve, Canadian singer and songwriter
- Reveal (born 1983), British rapper
- Rexxie (born 1994), Nigerian record producer, DJ and songwriter
- Reyash (born 1974), Polish musician and singer
- Reykon (born 1986), Colombian reggaeton performer
- Reynaert (1955–2020), Belgian singer-songwriter
- Rezar (born 1994), Dutch-Albanian professional wrestler and former mixed martial artist
- Řezník (born 1986), Czech rapper
- Rezz (born 1995), Ukrainian–Canadian DJ and record producer
- Rhio (born 1996), English professional wrestler
- Rhymefest (born 1977), American hip hop artist
- Rhymson (born 1968), Tanzanian rapper
- Rhyno (born 1975), American wrestler
- Riachão (1921–2020), Brazilian composer and singer
- Rico (1971–2022), Scottish musician
- Ricochet (born 1988), American wrestler
- Ridan (born 1975), French singer
- Ridgio (born 1995), American rapper and record producer
- Ridsa (born 1990), French rapper and singer
- Rigolboche (1842–1920), French dancer
- Rihanna (born 1988), Barbadian singer
- Riho (born 1997), Japanese professional wrestler
- Rikidōzan (1924–1963), Korean-born Japanese wrestler
- Rikishi (born 1965), Samoan-American professional wrestler
- Rikki (born 1975), Japanese folk singer
- Rim'K (born 1978), French-Algerian rapper
- Rimzee (born 1991), British rapper and songwriter
- RIN (born 1994), German-born rapper
- Rina (born 2006), Japanese professional wrestler
- Rishiking (born 1992), Indian music composer, rapper, filmmaker and screenwriter
- Riskykidd (born 1994), Greek rapper and songwriter
- Rita, Japanese voice actress, singer and lyricist
- Ritchie (born 1952), British-Brazilian singer-songwriter, musician, composer, dancer and multi-instrumentalist
- Riton (born 1978), English electronic music DJ and producer
- Rittz (born 1980), American rapper
- Rivulets, American singer-songwriter
- Riya, Japanese singer
- Riz (born 1986), Malaysian singer
- RJMrLA (born 1984), American rapper
- Rkomi (born 1994), Italian rapper and songwriter
- RL, American singer and songwriter
- RM (born 1994), South Korean rapper and record producer
- Roadblock (born 1960), American professional wrestler
- Roadkill (born 1976), American professional wrestler
- Robin (born 1990), Mexican professional wrestler
- Robotaki (born 1991), Canadian DJ and producer
- RoccStar, American music producer, songwriter, recording artist and rapper
- Rocko (born 1979), American rapper
- Rockwell (born 1964), American singer
- Rockwilder (born 1971), American hip hop and R&B record producer
- Rocky (born 1999), South Korean singer-songwriter, rapper, dancer, composer and actor
- Rodriguinho (born 1978), Brazilian singer, composer and producer
- Roesy, Irish singer-songwriter and model
- Rogéria (1943–2017), Brazilian actress and make-up artist
- Rohff (born 1977), French rapper
- Rohini (born 1969), Indian actress, lyricist, screenwriter, voice actor and director
- Rola (born 1990), Japanese fashion model and TV personality of Bangladeshi descent
- Romanthony (1967–2013), American musician
- Rome (born 1970), American R&B singer
- Romeo (born 1980), English rapper and MC
- Romeo (born 1989), American rapper and actor
- Ron (born 1953), Italian singer-songwriter and musician
- Rondodasosa (born 2002), Italian rapper
- Ronika, English singer-songwriter, producer and DJ
- RoopeK, Finnish rapper and record producer
- RoRo, Barbadian singer and songwriter
- Roscoe (born 1983), American rapper
- Rose (born 1978), French singer, songwriter and composer
- Rosé (born 1989), Scottish-American drag queen and singer
- Rosé (born 1997), South Korean-New Zealand singer
- Rosemarie (born 1948), Filipino actress
- Rosemary (born 1983), Canadian wrestler
- Rosey (1970–2017), American professional wrestler
- Roshanara (1894–1926), Anglo-Indian dancer
- Roshelle (born 1995), Italian singer-songwriter
- Rosinha (born 1971), Portuguese singer, songwriter and accordion player
- Rosko, American singer-songwriter and producer
- Rossa (born 1978), Indonesian singer
- Rosto (1969–2019), Dutch artist and filmmaker
- Rothy (born 1999), South Korean singer
- Rotimi (born 1988), Nigerian-American actor and singer
- Rouge (born 1992), Congolese-South African rapper and television presenter
- Rovi (1919–1996), Welsh magician
- Rowan (born 1981), American wrestler
- Rowoon (born 1996), South Korean actor and singer
- Rox (born 1988), English singer-songwriter
- Roxanne (1929–2024), American model and actress
- Roxen (born 2000), Romanian singer
- Roxrite (born 1982), American dancer
- Roy (born 1992), Indian singer, music director and actor
- Röya (born 1982), Azerbaijani singer
- RS (2000–2019), Dutch rapper
- Ruaka (born 2004), Japanese professional wrestler
- Ruby (born 1981), Egyptian singer and actress
- Ruckus (born 1978), American professional wrestler
- Rudeboy (born 1981), Nigerian singer
- Ruelle (born 1985), American singer-songwriter
- Rufus (born 1942), French actor
- Ruggedman, Nigerian rapper
- Rugido (born 1991), Mexican professional wrestler
- Rukhshana (1940–2020), Afghan singer
- Rukkus (born 1970), American wrestler
- Rumer (born 1979), Pakistani-born British singer-songwriter
- RUNAGROUND (born 1987), American electro-pop artist, producer and singer-songwriter
- Runtown (born 1989), Nigerian singer, songwriter and producer
- Rupini (born 1969), Indian actress
- Rurutia, Japanese singer-songwriter
- Rush (born 1988), Mexican professional wrestler
- Rusko (born 1985), British electronic music producer and DJ
- Russ (born 1992), American rapper, singer, songwriter and record producer
- Russella, British actor, dancer, model, choreographer, singer and comedian
- Russya (born 1968), Ukrainian singer and musician
- Rustie (born 1983), Scottish musician
- Ruudolf (born 1983), Finnish hip hop artist
- Rv (born 1993), British rapper and songwriter
- Rvfv (born 2001), Spanish singer and rapper
- Rvssian (born 1988), Jamaican record producer, singer and songwriter
- Rxseboy (born 1999), American hip hop rapper
- Ryback (born 1981), American wrestler
- Ryō (born 1973), Japanese model, actress and singer
- Rytmus (born 1977), Slovak rapper, singer, songwriter, actor and television personality
- Ryuchell (1995–2023), Japanese model and singer
- RZA (born 1969), American rapper, record producer, musician, actor, filmmaker and author

== S ==
- Saafir (1970–2024), American rapper, producer and actor
- Saag, Indian singer
- Saandip (born 1978), Indian singer, actor and anchor
- SAARA (born 1994), Finnish singer and TV host
- Saasa (born 1984), Japanese singer
- Saba (born 1994), American rapper and record producer
- Saba (born 1997), Danish singer and musical theatre actress
- Sabah (1927–2014), Lebanese singer and actress
- Sabi (born 1988), American singer-songwriter and actress
- Sabi (born 2000), Russian singer and songwriter
- Sabian (born 1975), American wrestler
- Sable (born 1967), American model, actress and wrestler
- Sabotage (1973–2003), Brazilian rapper and songwriter
- Sabrepulse, English musician
- Sabrina (born 1936), English glamour model
- Sabrina (born 1969), Greek singer
- Sabrina (born 1982), Portuguese singer
- Sabrina (born 1989), Filipino singer
- Sabu (1964–2025), American wrestler
- Sacario, American rapper and songwriter
- Sadahzinia (born 1977), Greek rapper
- Sade (born 1959), Nigerian-born British singer-songwriter
- Sadha (born 1984), Indian actress
- Sadiki (born 1971), Jamaican-American singer-songwriter and producer
- Sadistik (born 1986), American alternative hip hop artist
- Sae (born 1995), Japanese professional wrestler
- SAFE (born 1997), Canadian singer, songwriter and producer
- Saffron (born 1968), Nigerian-born British singer
- Safiath (born 1982), Nigerien singer, rapper and songwriter
- Safinaz (born 1983), Armenian belly dancer
- Saga (born 1975), Swedish white nationalist singer-songwriter
- Saga (born 1979), American MC
- Sagat (born 1970), American rapper and music producer
- Sagat (born 1990), Japanese professional wrestler
- Sagittaria (born 1998), Spanish drag queen
- Sahakdukht, Armenian composer
- Saharet (1878–1964), Australian dancer
- SahBabii (born 1997), American rapper, singer and songwriter
- Sahlene (born 1976), Swedish singer and actress
- Saian (born 1983), Turkish rapper and songwriter
- Saigon (born 1977), American rapper
- Saiko (born 2002), Spanish singer and songwriter
- Saikumar (born 1963), Indian actor
- Sailorine (born 1979), Norwegian singer-songwriter and musician
- Saint, American drag performer
- Saint-Preux (born 1948), French composer
- Saki (1870–1916), English writer
- Sakura (born 1969), Japanese musician
- Salena (born 1998), Austrian singer and songwriter
- Salgadinho (born 1970), Brazilian singer and composer
- Salmo (born 1984), Italian rapper, record producer and actor
- Salomé (born 1943), Spanish singer
- Salome (born 1985), Iranian rapper
- Saloni (1950–2010), Pakistani film actress
- Salt (born 1966), American rapper
- Salyu (born 1980), Japanese singer
- Sameksha (born 1985), Indian actress
- Samian (born 1983), Canadian rapper
- Samiyam, American hip hop producer
- Sammus (born 1986), American underground rapper and record producer
- Samo (born 1975), Mexican singer and songwriter
- Sampaguita, Filipino singer
- Samra (born 1995), Lebanese-German rapper
- Samsaya (born 1979), Indian-born Norwegian singer and actress
- Samsong (born 1974), Nigerian singer
- Samu (born 1963), American professional wrestler
- Samuthirakani (born 1973), Indian director
- Sanchez (born 1964), Jamaican reggae singer-songwriter and record producer
- Sanchez (born 1986), South Korean–New Zealand rapper and singer
- Sandhya (born 1924), Indian actress
- Sandhya (born 1988), Indian actress
- Sandrin, French composer
- Sandro (1945–2010), Argentine singer and actor
- Sandy (born 1986), Indian actor and choreographer
- Sanely (born 1991), Mexican professional wrestler
- Sanga (born 1985), Indian wrestler
- Sangeeta (born 1947), Pakistani actress and film director
- Sanghavi (born 1977), Indian actress
- Sangie (born 1995), Malawian reggae artist and songwriter
- Sangiovanni (born 2003), Italian singer and songwriter
- Şanışer (born 1987), Turkish rapper, singer and songwriter
- Sankaradi (1924–2001), Indian actor
- Sanrabb (born 1975), Norwegian musician
- Sansón (born 1994), Mexican professional wrestler
- Santa (born 1991), French singer-songwriter and musician
- Santana (born 1991), American professional wrestler
- Santigold (born 1976), American singer-songwriter and producer
- Sapho (born 1950), Moroccan-born French singer
- Sapphire (1934–1996), American wrestler
- Sapphire (born 1950), American author and performance poet
- Sarada (born 1945), Indian actress
- Sarangapani, Indian composer
- Sareee (born 1996), Japanese professional wrestler
- Sarettii, Swedish rapper
- Saritah, Australian singer-songwriter
- Saritha, Indian actress
- Sarkodie (born 1988), Ghanaian rapper and songwriter
- Sarray (born 1996), Japanese wrestler
- Sarz (born 1989), Nigerian record producer and musician
- SASH! (born 1970), German DJ and producer
- Sasha (born 1974), Jamaican dancehall recording artist and DJ
- Sasha (born 1969), Welsh DJ and producer
- Sasy (born 1988), Iranian singer-songwriter
- Sat (born 1975), French rapper
- Satchel (born 1970), American musician and songwriter
- Sathyaraj (born 1954), Indian actor
- Sati (born 1976), Lithuanian singer
- SATOMi (born 1989), Japanese singer-songwriter
- Satoshi (born 1998), Moldovan rapper
- Satsuki, Japanese musician
- Sattar (born 1949), Iranian singer
- Saukrates (born 1978), Canadian rapper, singer and record producer
- SaulPaul, American rapper and singer-songwriter
- Savage (born 1956), Italian singer, record producer and composer
- Savage (born 1981), New Zealander hip hop singer and rapper
- Savannah (1970–1994), American pornographic actress
- Saweetie (born 1993), American rapper and singer
- SayGrace (born 1997), Australian singer
- Scalper (born 1967), British rapper, producer and songwriter
- Scarface (born 1970), American rapper
- Scarlett (born 1991), American wrestler
- ScarLip (born 2000), American rapper
- Scarlxrd (born 1994), English rapper and YouTuber
- Scarub, American rapper and record producer
- SCH (born 1993), French rapper of German descent
- Schafter (born 2003), Polish rapper, singer, record producer, music video director and songwriter
- Scientist (born 1960), Jamaican record producer
- Scorcher (born 1986), British MC and producer
- Scratch, American hip hop musician
- Scribe (born 1979), New Zealand rapper
- Scrilla (born 1983), American rapper
- Scrufizzer, English rapper, MC, singer-songwriter and record producer
- SDM (born 1995), French rapper
- Seamo (born 1975), Japanese rapper and hip-hop artist
- SebastiAn (born 1981), French musician, composer, engineer and DJ
- Sech (born 1993), Panamanian singer
- Sederginne, Belgian drag performer
- Seema (born 1957), Indian actress
- Seetha, Indian actress
- Sefo (born 1998), Turkish singer, songwriter and rapper
- Sefyu (born 1981), French rapper
- Şehinşah (born 1986), Turkish rapper and songwriter
- Sehun (born 1994), South Korean dancer and rapper
- Seka (born 1954), American pornographic actress
- Selebobo (born 1992), Nigerian singer and songwriter
- Selen (born 1966), Italian actress, TV presenter and pornographic actress
- Selena (born 1965), Dutch singer
- Sematary (born 2000), American rapper, songwriter and record producer
- Senidah (born 1985), Slovenian singer-songwriter
- Sensational (1974–2026), Guyanese-American rapper
- Sensei (born 1978), Mexican wrestler
- Seohyun (born 1991), South Korean singer, dancer, model and actress
- Seola, South Korean singer and actress
- Seori (born 1996), South Korean singer-songwriter
- SeoRock (born 1981), South Korean singer and VJ
- September (born 1984), Swedish singer
- Sere (born 1976), Finnish rap artist
- Serena (born 1951), American pornographic actress
- Serengeti, American rapper
- Serenity (born 1969), American pornographic actress
- Serguei (1933–2019), Brazilian singer and composer
- Serpentico (born 1984), Puerto Rican professional wrestler
- serpentwithfeet (born 1988), American singer
- Seryoga (born 1976), Belarusian rapper
- Sesenne (1914–2010), Saint Lucian singer
- Sethu (born 1997), Italian singer and rapper
- Seulgi (born 1994), South Korean singer
- Seungri (born 1990), Korean singer, dancer and actor
- Sevdaliza (born 1987), Iranian-Dutch singer, songwriter, record producer, visual artist and director
- Seven (born 1978), Swiss musician and singer
- Seven (born 1984), South Korean singer
- Séverine (born 1948), French singer
- Sevin (born 1981), American Christian hip hop rapper
- Sexmane (born 2000), Finnish rapper
- Sha (born 1979), German singer
- Shaam (born 1977), Indian model and actor
- Shaan (born 1972), Indian singer and TV host
- Shabjdeed, Palestinian rapper
- Shablo (born 1980), Argentinian-Italian DJ and music producer
- Shabnam (born 1946), Pakistani actress
- Shaboozey (born 1995), American singer-songwriter, filmmaker and record producer
- Shad (born 1982), Kenyan-born Canadian hip hop musician
- Shade (born 1987), Italian rapper, singer and voice actor
- Shadia (1931–2017), Egyptian actress and singer
- Shafi (1968–2025), Indian film director
- Shaggy (born 1968), Jamaica-born American singer and musician
- Shagrath (born 1976), Norwegian musician
- Shahir (born 1988), Malaysian singer
- Shahrzad (1950–2025), Iranian actress
- Shake (born 1950), Malaysian singer
- Shakeel (1945–2023), Pakistani actor
- Shakila (1935–2017), Indian actress
- Shaman (born 1991), Russian singer-songwriter and music producer
- Shamlee (born 1987), Indian actress
- Shammi (1929–2018), Indian actress
- Shammi (1939–2001), Pakistani actress
- Shammu (born 1988), Indian actress and model
- Shane (born 1969), American pornographic actress and director
- Shangela (born 1981), American drag queen
- Shankar (born 1960), Indian actor and director
- Shanky (born 1991), Indian professional wrestler
- Shanmugasundari (1937–2012), Indian actress
- Shanna (born 1982), Portuguese professional wrestler
- Shannel (born 1979), American drag queen and television personality
- Shannon (born 1958), American singer
- Shantel (born 1968), German DJ and record producer
- Shaolin (1971–2016), Brazilian humorist, comedian and media presenter
- Shark, American musician
- Sharkula (born 1973), American rapper
- Sharonne (born 1976), Spanish drag queen, actress and singer
- ShaSimone, British-Ghanaian singer and rapper
- Shatraug, Finnish-born musician
- Shawnna (born 1978), American rapper
- Shay (born 1990), Belgian francophone rapper
- Shaydee (born 1987), Nigerian singer-songwriter and vocalist
- Shazza (born 1967), Polish singer and occasional actress
- Sheamus (born 1978), Irish professional wrestler and actor
- shebeshxt, South African rapper
- Shehyee (born 1992), Filipino rapper, songwriter and Internet personality
- Sheila (born 1945), French singer
- Shela (born 1980), Japanese pop singer and actress
- Shellback (born 1985), Swedish record producer and songwriter
- Shèna (born 1971), English singer
- Shenseea (born 1996, Jamaican dancehall singer
- Shequida, Jamaican singer-songwriter and drag artist
- Sherrick (1957–1999), American musician
- Shery (born 1985), Guatemalan singer and songwriter
- Shetta (born 1990), Tanzanian musician
- Shin (born 1971), Taiwanese singer, songwriter and actor
- Shindy (born 1988), German rapper
- Shinehead (born 1962), English-born Jamaican singer, rapper and DJ
- Shing02 (born 1975), Japanese hip hop recording artist and record producer
- Shion, Japanese-born Korean R&B singer
- Shiva (born 1999), Italian rapper
- Shizzi (born 1984), Nigerian record producer, disk jockey and songwriter
- Shlohmo (born 1990), American musician and producer
- Shocka (born 1988), English rapper
- Shocker (born 1971), Mexican wrestler
- Shockercito (born 1980), Mexican wrestler
- Shona, French singer-songwriter
- Shonlock (born 1975), American Christian hip hop artist
- Shoo (born 1981), Korean singer
- Shorty (1967–2019), American rapper and producer
- Shorty (born 1980), Croatian rapper
- Shot (1989–2017), Kazakh-Russian rapper
- Shotzi (born 1992), American wrestler
- Shownu (born 1992), South Korean singer, dancer and actor
- Showry, South Korean comedian
- ShowYouSuck (born 1985), American rapper
- Shrekeezy (1993–2015), Kenyan radio host, TV presenter, rapper and DJ
- Shruti (born 1975), Indian actress
- Shubh (born 1997), Indian rapper, singer and songwriter
- Shuchanda (born 1947), Bangladeshi film actress and director
- Shura (born 1988), English singer, songwriter and record producer
- Shurik'n (born in 1966), French hip hop artist
- Shwayze (born 1985), American rapper
- Shyama (1935–2017), Indian actress
- Shygirl (born 1993), English rapper, DJ, singer and songwriter
- Shy'm (born 1985), French singer
- Shyne (born 1978), Belizean rapper
- Shystie (born 1983), British rapper, songwriter and actress
- Siba (born 1969), Brazilian folk-rock singer and songwriter
- Sibah (born 1970), Bolivian blues and rock and roll singer-songwriter
- Sibiraj (born 1982), Indian actor
- sic, Canadian electronic noise artist
- Sido (born 1980), German rapper
- Sie7e (born 1977), Puerto Rican singer
- sifow (born 1985), Japanese businesswoman and former singer
- Sigala (born 1993), English DJ and record producer
- Sigga (born 1962), Icelandic singer
- Signmark (born 1978), Finnish hip hop recording artist
- Siiickbrain, American singer, songwriter and model
- Silenoz (born 1977), Norwegian guitarist
- Silkski (d. 2016), American rapper, songwriter and music producer
- Silla (born 1984), German rapper
- Silueta (born 1985), Mexican professional wrestler
- Silvan (born 1937), Italian illusionist, writer and television personality
- Sim (1926–2009), French humorist, writer and comedian
- Sima (born 1996), Slovak pop and hip-hop singer
- Simi (born 1988), Nigerian singer, songwriter and actress
- Simone (born 1962), American singer and actress
- Simon-Max (1852–1923), French tenor
- Simran (born 1976), Indian actress
- SinB (born 1998), South Korean singer, dancer and actress
- Sinbad (born 1956), American actor and comedian
- Since (born 1992), South Korean rapper
- Singuila (born 1977), French singer
- Sinik (born 1980), French rap artist
- SippinPurpp (born 1996), Portuguese rapper
- Sirah (born 1988), American rapper and singer
- Sirelda (born 1976), Canadian professional wrestler
- Siriusmo, German record producer
- Sirone (1940–2009), American musician and composer
- Sirusho (born 1987), Armenian singer
- SisQó (born 1978), American R&B singer, songwriter, record producer, dancer and actor
- Sissi (born 1999), Italian singer-songwriter
- Sithara (born 1973), Indian actress
- Sivakumar (born 1941), Indian actor
- S!vas, Danish rapper of Iranian origin
- Sivion (born 1972), American Christian hip hop musician
- Sivuca (1930–2006), Brazilian musician
- Sixtoo, Canadian underground hip hop DJ, producer and rapper
- Siya (born 1987), American rapper
- Sizzla (born 1976), Jamaican reggae musician
- Sjava (born 1983), South African singer, rapper and actor
- Sjón (born 1962), Icelandic poet, novelist, and screenwriter
- SK (1974–2021), Iranian singer
- Skadi (born 1996), Mexican professional wrestler
- Skaiwater (born 2000), British rapper and record producer
- Skales (born 1991), Nigerian rapper, singer and songwriter
- Skándalo (born 1982), Mexican professional wrestler
- Skatterman (born 1978), American rapper
- Skayde (born 1964), Mexican wrestler
- Skeme (born 1990), American rapper
- Skepta (born 1982), British grime MC, rapper and record producer
- Skerik (born 1964), American musician
- Sketchman (born 1988), British recording artist, songwriter, record producer and musician
- Skiifall, Canadian rapper
- Skillibeng (born 1996), Jamaican dancehall DJ and rapper
- Skillz (born 1974), American rapper
- Skin (born 1967), British singer
- Skinnyman (born 1974), English rapper
- Skooly (born 1994), American rapper
- Skowa (1955–2024), Brazilian singer-songwriter and musician
- Skread (born 1981), French hip hop record producer and composer
- Skream (born 1986), English electronic music producer
- Skrillex (born 1988), American DJ and singer-songwriter
- SKRIP (born 1987), American Christian hip hop musician and producer
- Skryptonite (born 1990), Kazakh rapper, singer, songwriter and music producer
- Skull (born 1979), South Korean singer
- Skyla (born 1991), English singer
- Skyzoo (born 1982), American hip hop emcee
- SL (born 2001), British rapper
- Slaine (born 1977), American hip hop MC
- Slame (born 1994), Russian rapper
- Slapdee (born 1987), Zambian hip hop and rap musician
- Slash (born 1965), British-born American guitarist
- Slava (born 1980), Russian singer and actress
- Slayyyter (born 1996), American singer-songwriter
- Sleep (born 1975), American hip hop artist
- Sleepy (born 1984), South Korean rapper and television personality
- Sleeq (born 1991), South Korean rapper
- Slick (born 1957), American professional wrestler
- Slim (born 1974), American R&B singer
- Slimka (born 1994), Swiss rapper
- Slimmy, Portuguese singer
- Slovetsky (born 1982), Russian rap artist
- Slowthai (born 1994), British rapper
- Slug (born 1972), American rapper
- Slushii (born 1997), American DJ and music producer
- Smartzee (born 1980), French-American rapper
- Smash (born 1959), American professional wrestler
- Smelly (born 1971), Japanese comedic performer
- Smiler, British rapper
- Smiley (born 1983), Romanian singer, songwriter, record producer, actor and television presenter
- Smiley (born 1997), Canadian rapper
- Smino (born 1991), American rapper
- Smitty (born 1979), American rapper
- Smokepurpp (born 1997), American rapper
- Smolasty (born 1995), Polish rapper, singer and record producer
- Smooth (born 1972), American singer, rapper and actress
- Smudo (born 1968), German rapper
- SNAILS (born 1988), Canadian DJ and music producer
- Snakefinger (1949–1987), English musician
- Snazzy, Nigerian-South African singer, songwriter and rapper
- Sneakbo (born 1992), British rapper
- sneakguapo, American rapper
- Sneazzy (born 1992), French rapper and actor
- Sneha (born 1981), Indian actress
- Snelle (born 1995), Dutch rapper and singer
- Snot (born 1997), American rapper, singer and songwriter
- Snotkop (born 1974), South African singer and rapper
- Snow (born 1969), Canadian singer-songwriter
- Snowboy, British-Cuban musician
- Sobha (1962–1980), Indian actress
- Sobhhï, Dubai-based R&B artist
- Socalled (born 1976), Canadian rapper and musician
- Sofia, Filipino singer
- Soju (born 1991), South Korean-American drag queen, singer and television/YouTube personality
- SoKo (born 1985), French singer and actress
- Sokodomo (born 2000), South Korean rapper and songwriter
- Sokół (born 1977), Polish emcee
- Sol (born 1988), American hip hop artist
- Solage, French composer
- Solange (1952–2021), Italian television personality, psychic and commentator
- Solar (born 1989), Polish rapper
- Solar (born 1991), South Korean singer, songwriter and actress
- Solbi (born 1983), South Korean singer and actress
- Solé (born 1973), American rapper
- Sole (born 1977), American hip hop artist
- Solitair (born 1975), Canadian hip hop MC and producer
- Solomon (born 1987), American hip hop artist
- sombr (born 2005), American singer-songwriter
- Sombrita (born 1968), Mexican professional wrestler
- Somi (born 1981), American singer-songwriter
- Sommore (born 1966), American actress and comedian
- Sonam (born 1972), Indian actress
- Sonique (born 1965), British DJ and singer
- Sonny (1935–1998), American singer and comedian
- SonReal (born 1985), Canadian singer, rapper and songwriter
- Soolking (born 1989), Algerian singer and rapper
- Soopafly (born 1972), American hip hop producer and rapper
- Sooyoung (born 1990), South Korean singer and actress
- Sopranal, Belgian singer
- Soprano (born 1979), French rapper
- Sorkun, Spanish singer
- Sorn (born 1996), Thai singer
- Sosay (born 1980), American actress, model and wrestler
- Souf (born 1990), French singer
- Souldia, Canadian rapper
- SoulJa (born 1983), Japanese hip-hop musician and songwriter
- SoulStice (born 1979), American rapper
- Soundarya (1972–2004), Indian actress
- Soundz (born 1983), American record producer and rapper
- Soup, American rapper
- Southside (born 1989), American record producer, songwriter and rapper
- Sowelu (born 1982), Japanese singer
- Soyeon (born 1998), South Korean singer, rapper and songwriter
- Soyou (born 1992), South Korean singer
- SpaceGhostPurrp (born 1991), American rapper and producer
- Spark (born 1992), English singer-songwriter
- Sparkle (born 1975), American singer
- Spax (born 1987), Nigerian record producer
- Speak (born 1976), Hungarian rapper, model and actor
- Speak! (born 1987), American rapper and songwriter
- Speech (born 1968), American rapper and musician
- Speedfreaks (1973–2010), Brazilian rapper, composer and musician
- Speedy (born 1979), Puerto Rican Reggaeton artist
- Spek, Canadian hip hop artist
- Spekti (born 1979), Finnish rapper
- SPELLLING (born 1991), American musician
- Spens (born 1975), Bulgarian hip hop artist
- Spenzo (born 1995), American rapper
- Spike (born 1968), English singer-songwriter
- Spose (born 1985), American rapper
- SPʘT (1951–2023), American record producer
- SPOT (born 1987), American rapper
- Sputnik (born 1943), Norwegian singer and musician
- Squarepusher (born 1975), English musician
- SR (born 1999), British rapper
- Sreemukhi (born 1993), Indian television presenter and actress
- Sridevi (1963–2018), Indian actress
- Sriimurali (born 1981), Indian actor
- Srikanth (born 1979), Indian actor
- Sriman (born 1972), Indian actor
- Srinath (born 1944), Indian actor and TV presenter
- Srinivas (born 1959), Indian singer
- Sripriya (born 1958), Indian actress
- Srividya (1953–2006), Indian actress
- SSGKobe (born 2003), American rapper and singer-songwriter
- SSION, American musician, video music director and performer
- Stacy (born 1990), Malaysian singer
- Stalley (born 1982), American rapper
- Stanislas (born 1972), French singer
- Stano (born 1981), Russian-Lithuanian singer and songwriter
- StarBuck (born 1973), Canadian-Finnish professional wrestler, singer and artist
- Starhawk (born 1951), American feminist and writer
- Starlet (born 1999), South African-English drag queen
- Starlito (born 1984), American rapper
- Starman (1974–2022), Mexican wrestler
- Starrah (born 1990), American singer-songwriter and rapper
- Stefano, Puerto Rican professional wrestler
- Stelarc (born 1946), Cyprus-born Australian performance artist
- Stell (born 1995), Filipino singer, dancer and choreographer
- Stendhal (1783–1842), pen-name of the French writer Marie-Henri Beyle
- Steno (1917–1988), Italian film director, screenwriter and cinematographer
- Stig (born 1978), Finnish hip hop, R&B and country music singer
- STIGMA, American wrestler
- Stigma, Mexican professional wrestler
- Sting (born 1951), English musician
- Sting (born 1959), American wrestler
- Stint, Canadian record producer and songwriter
- Stitches (born 1995), American rapper
- Stoka (born 1981), Croatian rap artist
- Stonebwoy (born 1988), Ghanaian musician
- Stor (born 1987), Swedish rapper
- Stormin (1984–2018), British MC and rapper
- Stormzy (born 1993), British rapper, singer and songwriter
- Stresi (born 1986), Albanian rapper
- Stretch (1968–1995), American rapper and record producer
- Strick (born 1986), American rapper, singer and songwriter
- Stringbean (1915–1973), American singer, musician and comedian
- Strings (born 1975), American rapper and songwriter
- Stromae (born 1985), Belgian Rwandan singer-songwriter
- Strongman, Ghanaian rapper
- Stwo (born 1992), French electronic musician, producer and DJ
- Stylah, British rapper
- Styrofoam (born 1973), Belgian singer and musician
- Suara, (born 1979) Japanese singer
- Suave (born 1966), American singer
- Subbalakshmi (1936–2023), Indian musician, composer and actress
- Subliminal (born 1979), Israeli hip hop artist and producer
- Suboi (born 1990), Vietnamese rapper, singer and songwriter
- Substantial, American hip hop recording artist
- Subtitle (born 1978), American rapper and producer
- Subtronics (born 1992), American DJ and producer
- Sudeepa (born 1971), Indian actor, director and producer
- Sudheer (died 2004), Indian actor
- Sudhir (1921–1997), Pakistani actor
- Sueco (born 1997), American rapper and singer-songwriter
- Suede, American jazz and blues singer
- Suffa (born 1977), Australian rapper and producer
- Suffix (born 1990), Malawian gospel rapper and songwriter
- Suga (born 1993), South Korean rapper and producer
- Sugar (born 1995), Ukrainian singer
- Sugaspott (born 1984), Zimbabwean rapper
- Suggs (born 1961), English singer-songwriter, musician, radio and television personality and actor
- Sugizo (born 1969), Japanese musician, singer, songwriter, composer, record producer, actor, writer and activist
- Suho (born 1991), South Korean singer and actor
- Sujata (born 1947), Bangladeshi retired film actress.
- Sujatha (1952–2011), Indian actress
- Sukanya (born 1972), Indian actress
- Sukh-E, Indian singer-songwriter and music producer
- Sukihana (born 1991), American reality television personality and rapper
- Sukumaran (1948–1997), Indian actor
- Sulakshana, Indian actress
- Sulli (1994–2019), South Korean singer, actress and model
- Sullyoon (born 2004), South Korean singer and dancer
- Sulo (born 1969), Swedish musician
- Sultan (born 1987), French Comorian hip hop artist and rapper
- Suman (born 1959), Indian actor
- Sumanth (born 1975), Indian actor
- Sumathi (born 1964), Indian actress
- Sumire (1987–2009), Japanese fashion model
- Summrs (born 1999), American rapper and singer
- Sundance (born 1972), American rapper, DJ and radio personality
- Sunday (born 1987), South Korean singer and musical actress
- Sungmin (born 1986), South Korean singer and actor
- Sunil (born 1974), Indian actor
- Sunny (born 1989), American-born South Korean singer, dancer and TV presenter
- Sunshine (born 1962), American professional wrestler
- Supaman, American rapper and dancer
- Supastition, American hip hop artist
- Supernatural (born 1970), American rapper
- Superpitcher, German DJ and producer
- Supla (born 1966), Brazilian musician
- Supreme (1970–2020), American professional wrestler
- Suriya (born 1975), Indian actor, producer and television presenter
- Surkin (born 1985), French musician, record producer, DJ and art director
- Sus (born 2000), British rapper
- Susan, Belgian drag performer
- Susan, Japanese singer
- Susan (1940–2004), Iranian singer
- Susana (born 1984), Dutch trance music vocalist, songwriter and radio host
- Suvaluxmi (born 1977), Indian actress
- Suzanitta (born 2003), Bulgarian singer
- Suzume (born 1998), Japanese professional wrestler
- Suzy (born 1980), Portuguese singer
- Suzy (born 1994), South Korean singer and actress
- Svoy (born 1980), American music producer, singer and songwriter
- Swanee (born 1952), Scottish-born Australian singer
- Swarnalatha (1973–2010), Indian singer
- Sway (1982–2026), British rapper
- Sway (born 1986), Japanese rapper, actor, lyricist and producer
- Swervy (born 2001), South Korean rapper and songwriter
- Swingfly, American-born Swedish rapper and singer
- Swings (born 1986), South Korean rapper
- Swish, American hip hop producer and rapper
- Switch, English record producer, songwriter, DJ and sound engineer
- SwizZz (born 1987), American rapper and songwriter
- Swoiia (aka Assol; born 1993), Ukrainian singer
- Syahrini (born 1980), Indonesian singer and actress
- Syang (born 1968), Brazilian musician, writer and model
- Syd (born 1992), American singer and songwriter
- Syience, American songwriter, record producer and musician
- Sylvie (1883–1970), French actress
- Symone (born 1995), American drag queen and model
- Syria (born 1977), Italian singer
- Syrinx (1949–2010), Romanian musician and composer
- SZA (born 1989), American singer and songwriter
- Szkieve, Belgian ambient musician and new media artist

== T ==
- Tablo (born 1980), Korean Canadian hip hop artist, songwriter, lyricist and author
- Taboo (born 1975), American rapper, singer, songwriter, actor and DJ
- Tabu (born 1971), Indian actress
- Tado (1974–2014), Filipino comedian, actor, radio personality, businessman
- Taebin (born 1980), South Korean singer
- Taegoon (born 1986), South Korean singer and dancer
- Taeyang (born 1988), South Korean singer
- Taffy (born 1963), English singer
- Tagaq (born 1975), Canadian singer
- Taichi (born 1980), Japanese professional wrestler
- Taína (born 1975), Puerto Rican model and host
- Taino, Puerto Rican rapper, singer-songwriter and producer
- Tainy (born 1989), Puerto Rican reggaeton producer
- Taiska (born 1955), Finnish singer
- Tajči (born 1970), Croatian singer, TV show host, published author and blogger
- Tajin (born 1965), Japanese comedian and radio personality
- Takaloo (born 1975), Iranian born British based boxer
- Takanohana (born 1972), Japanese sumo wrestler
- Takeoff (1994–2022), American rapper
- Takfarinas (born 1958), French-Algerian singer-songwriter and musician
- Takoyakida (born 1986), Japanese professional wrestler
- Taktloss (born 1975), German rap artist
- Tallulah (1948–2008), German-born British DJ, recording artist and producer
- Talma (1861–1944), British magician
- Talos (1987–2024), Irish indie electronic musician
- Támar, American singer
- Tamina (born 1978), American professional wrestler and actress
- Tamori (born 1945), Japanese television celebrity
- tana (born 2006), American rapper and singer
- Tanaka (born 1998), Japanese rapper, vocalist and lyricist
- Tananai (born 1995), Italian singer-songwriter, rapper and record producer
- Tancrède, French singer
- Tania (1908–1999), Spanish singer
- Tank (born 1976), American singer-songwriter and record producer
- Tank (born 1977), German musician
- Tank (born 1982), Taiwanese singer-songwriter
- Tao (born 1993), Chinese rapper
- Tara (1944–2007), Indian actress
- Tara (born 1971), American wrestler
- Tara (born 1973), Indian actress
- Tarako (1960–2024), Japanese voice actress
- Taraxias, Greek hip-hop artist
- Target, Croatian rapper
- Tarzzan (born 2002), South Korean singer, rapper, model and dancer
- Tash (born 1971), American rapper
- Tasis, Finnish rapper
- Tataee (born 1976), Romanian record producer and rapper
- Ta-Tanisha (born 1953), American actress
- Tatanka (born 1961), American wrestler
- Tatianna (born 1987), American drag queen, musician and reality television personality
- Tau (born 1986), Polish rapper, vocalist, beatboxer and hip-hop producer
- TAY (born 1999), Portuguese trap and R&B singer and dancer
- Tayc (born 1996), French singer
- Tayna (born 1996), Kosovo-Albanian rapper and singer
- Taz (born 1967), American radio presenter, color commentator and professional wrestler
- T-Boz (born 1970), American singer-songwriter, actress, author and executive producer
- TC, English drum and bass producer, singer and DJ
- Tchami (born 1985), French record producer and DJ
- TCTS, English DJ and record producer
- Tede (born 1976), Polish rapper
- Tedua (born 1994), Italian rapper and actor
- Teebs (born 1987), American electronic producer and artist
- Teejayx6 (born 2001), American rapper
- Teephlow (born 1991), Ghanaian hip hop recording artist
- Teesy (born 1990), German singer, songwriter and rapper
- TeeZee, English-Nigerian rapper, singer and songwriter
- Tehua (1943–2014), Mexican singer
- Tei (born 1983), South Korean singer
- Teixeirinha (1927–1985), Brazilian musician
- Tejashree, Indian actress
- Tekno (born 1992), Nigerian singer-songwriter and record producer
- Tela (born 1970), American rapper
- Temperamento (born 1981), Puerto Rican-American rap artist
- Templario (born 1992), Mexican professional wrestler
- Tempo (born 1977), Puerto Rican rapper and songwriter
- Tems (born 1995), Nigerian singer, songwriter and record producer
- Ten (born 1996), Thai singer, dancer and rapper
- Teni (born 1993), Nigerian singer, songwriter and entertainer
- Tenmon (born 1971), Japanese composer
- TENN (1978–2014), Japanese MC
- Tensnake (born 1975), German DJ and producer
- Teoman (born 1967), Turkish singer-songwriter
- Teoman (born 1993), German professional wrestler
- Termanology (born 1982), American rapper and record producer
- Terry-Thomas (1911–1990), English actor and comedian
- Teru, Japanese guitarist
- TERU (born 1971), Japanese singer
- Tes, American rapper
- Tesher (born 1995), Canadian rapper, singer-songwriter and producer
- Tessa (born 1997), Danish rapper
- Test (1975–2009), Canadian wrestler
- Testo (born 1988), German rapper
- Tetsuya (born 1969), Japanese singer, musician and composer
- Teya (born 2000), Austrian singer and songwriter
- Thalía (born 1971), Mexican singer and actress
- Tharika, Indian actress
- Thatboykwame (born 1997), Australian rapper and record producer
- The8, (born 1997) Chinese-born South Korean singer
- Theia, New Zealand singer and songwriter
- Thennavan (born 1966), Indian actor
- Thiaguinho (born 1983), Brazilian singer, composer and presenter
- Thighpaulsandra (born 1958), Welsh experimental musician
- ThirumaLi (born 1995), Indian rapper and songwriter
- Thor (born 1953), Canadian bodybuilding champion and heavy metal musician
- Thor (born 1980), Filipino singer-songwriter and performer
- Thouxanbanfauni (born 1993), American rapper and record producer
- Thrasher (born 1969), American professional wrestler
- Thrust (born 1976), Canadian rapper
- Thunder (1981–2016), Australian masked professional wrestler
- Thunder (born 1990), South Korean singer, songwriter, actor and model
- Thundercat (born 1994), American bassist, singer, producer and songwriter
- Thunderstick (born 1954), English drummer
- Thurz, American hip hop artist
- ThxSoMch (born 2001), Canadian singer-songwriter
- T.I. (born 1980), American rapper and actor
- Tia, Japanese pop singer-songwriter
- TiA (born 1987), Japanese pop singer
- Tiakola (born 1999), French rapper and singer
- TID (born 1981), Tanzanian musician
- Tieks, English record producer and songwriter
- Tiësto (born 1969), Dutch DJ and electronic music producer
- Tifa (born 1960), Bosnian singer
- Tiffany (born 1973), Mexican professional wrestler
- Tiffany (born 1985), American model, actress, stuntwoman and wrestler
- Tiffany (born 1989), South Korean singer, dancer, model and television host
- Tiggy (born 1970), Danish singer
- Tigris, Malawian singer and rapper
- Tiitof (born 1995), French rapper and trap music artist
- Tika (born 1980), Indonesian singer and songwriter
- Tim (born 1981), Korean-American singer
- Timal (born 1997), French rapper
- Timati (born 1983), Russian rapper
- Timaya (born 1980), Nigerian singer-songwriter
- Timbaland (born 1972), American producer, rapper and singer
- Timbuktu, Canadian underground hip hop artist
- Timbuktu (born 1975), Swedish rapper and reggae artist
- Time (born 1985), American rapper
- Timz (born 1985), American rapper
- Tina (born 1984), Slovak singer
- Tini (born 1997), Argentine singer, songwriter, actress, dancer and model
- Tinieblas (born 1939), Mexican professional wrestler
- Tink (born 1995), American rapper and singer
- Tinman (born 1961), English house music producer/remixer
- Tinny (born 1982), Ghanaian rapper
- Tin-Tan (1915–1973), Mexican actor, singer and comedian
- Tippu (born 1978), Indian playback singer
- Tiririca (born 1965), Brazilian entertainer
- TisaKorean, American rapper, record producer and dancer
- Tita (born 1999), Bulgarian singer, model and actress
- Titán (born 1990), Mexican professional wrestler
- Titi, Senegalese singer
- Tizzo, Canadian rapper
- TJP (born 1984), American wrestler
- TJR (born 1983), American DJ and music producer
- TOBI (born 1993), Nigerian-born Canadian singer and rapper
- TobyMac (born 1964), American Christian hip hop artist, music producer, songwriter and author
- Togo (1905–1952), Filipino actor
- Tohjiro (1956–2026), Japanese adult video director
- Token (born 1998), American rapper, singer and record producer
- Tokimonsta (born 1987), American record producer and DJ
- ToMa (born 1997), Croatian singer
- Tomatito (born 1958), Spanish composer and guitarist
- Tomato (born 1969), American singer-songwriter and drummer
- Tomcraft (1975–2024), German DJ and producer
- TommyInnit (born 2004), English YouTuber, Twitch streamer and comedian
- Tonedeff (born 1976), American rapper, producer and singer
- Tonetta (born 1949), Canadian musician and visual artist
- Tonéx (born 1975), American singer-songwriter, musician, dancer and producer
- Tongo (1957–2023), Peruvian singer and entertainer
- Tongolele (1932–2025), Mexican-American vedette and actress
- Tonia (born 1947), Belgian singer
- Toñizonte (born 1959), Peruvian drag queen and dancer
- Tontxu (born 1973), Spanish singer-songwriter
- TonyPitony (born 1996), Italian singer-songwriter and performer
- Tooji (born 1987), Norwegian-Iranian singer, model and television host
- Toomi (born 1999), Japanese gravure idol and actress
- Toosii (born 2000), American rapper, singer and songwriter
- TopGunn (born 1991), Danish rapper and music producer
- Toquel (born 1994), Albanian rapper
- Toquinho (born 1946), Brazilian singer, musician and composer
- Torch (born 1971), German rapper
- Torch (born 1982), Haitian-American rapper
- Tori (born 1964), American professional wrestler
- Tormento (born 1975), Italian rapper and record producer
- Tornado (born 1966), South African professional wrestler
- Torombolo (born 1985), Nicaraguan reggaeton and hip hop singer
- Torres (born 1991), American singer-songwriter
- Toshi (born 1965), Japanese singer-songwriter and musician
- Totò (1898–1967), Italian comedian, actor, writer and singer-songwriter
- Tourist (born 1987), English electronic musician and songwriter
- Towkio (born 1993), American rapper
- Toxin (born 1997), Mexican professional wrestler
- Toya (born 1983), singer
- Tozovac (born 1936), Serbian singer, musician and actor
- T-Pain (born 1984), American singer, songwriter, rapper and record producer
- TQ (born 1976), American singer
- Trae (born 1980), rapper
- Transit22 (born 1989), Canadian hip hop artist
- Traxamillion (1979–2022), American rapper
- Treach (born 1970), American rapper and actor
- Trebor, French composer
- Trenyce (born 1980), American singer
- Trettmann (born 1973), German rapper
- Trials (born 1983), Australian rapper, songwriter and record producer
- Tricky (born 1968), English musician and actor
- Trigmatic (born 1984), Ghanaian musician, composer and songwriter
- Trigno (born 2002), Italian singer-songwriter
- Trim (born 1984), English grime MC
- Trina (born 1978), American rapper
- Trinity (born 1971), American stuntwoman, actress and wrestler
- Trivecta, American electronic dance music artist and DJ
- Tritón (born 1987), Mexican professional wrestler
- Trkaj (born 1983), Slovenian rapper
- Troja, American actress and singer
- Trouble (1987–2022), American rapper
- Trueno (born 1979), Mexican professional wrestler
- Trueno (born 2002), Argentine rapper and singer
- Tshego (born 1990), South African-American singer-songwriter
- Tsubasa (born 1973), Japanese professional wrestler
- Tsumyoki (born 2001), Indian rapper, singer-songwriter and record producer
- Tsunku (born 1968), Japanese singer, songwriter and music producer
- Tucker (born 1990), American wrestler
- Tucker (born 1990), Northern Irish professional wrestler
- Tujamo (born 1988), German DJ and electro house music producer
- Tulisa (born 1988), English actress and singer
- Tuna (born 1984), Israeli rapper, singer, songwriter and actor
- Tuna (born 1985), Macedonian-Albanian singer and songwriter
- Tunisiano (born 1979), French rapper
- Tuotilo, Irish composer
- Turbo, British street dancer, musician and entertainer
- Turing, Filipino drag performer
- Turk (born 1981), American rapper
- Tus (born 1986), Greek rapper
- Tweet (born 1971), American singer-songwriter and guitarist
- Tweezy (born 1992), South African record producer and rapper
- Twiggy (born 1949), English model, actress and singer
- Twink (born 1944), English drummer, singer-songwriter and actor
- Twinkle (1948–2015), British pop singer
- Twinpearly (born 1998), Mongolian singer-songwriter
- Twista (born 1973), American rapper
- twlv (born 1993), South Korean singer-songwriter and record producer
- Ty (1972–2020), British hip hop artist
- Tyagaraja (1767–1847), Indian composer
- Tycho (born 1977), American musician, record producer, composer and songwriter
- TyDi (born 1987), Australian DJ and record producer
- Tyga (born 1989), American hip hop recording artist
- Tymee (born 1985), South Korean rapper, songwriter and pianist
- Typhoon (born 1984), Dutch rapper
- Tyrus (born 1973), American cable news personality, actor and professional wrestler
- Tyssem (born 1984), French singer-songwriter
- Tzuki (born 1974), Mexican wrestler

== U ==
- Ua (born 1972), Japanese singer-songwriter, producer and actress
- UCast (born 1988), Belarusian trance DJ and producer
- Udaykumar (1933–1985), Indian actor and producer
- Uee (born 1988), South Korean singer, dancer and actress
- Uffie (born 1987), American-French singer-songwriter, rapper, DJ and fashion designer
- UFO (born 1981), Danish singer and rapper
- U-God (born 1970), American rapper
- Uka (born 1982), Mongolian singer, actress and TV personality
- U-Know (born 1986), South Korean singer, actor and a member of the pop duo TVXQ
- Ultraman (born 1947), Mexican professional wrestler
- Ultratumbita (d.2018), Mexican professional wrestler
- Umaga (1973–2009), American professional wrestler
- Umji (born 1998), South Korean singer-songwriter and dancer
- Underscores (born 2000), American singer-songwriter and producer
- Uniikki (born 1981), Finnish artist
- Unikkatil (born 1981), Kosovan-Albanian rapper, singer, songwriter and record producer
- Unk (1981–2025), American DJ, hype man and rapper
- UnoTheActivist (born 1996), American rapper and songwriter
- Urbanus (born 1949), Belgian comedian, actor and singer
- URO (born 1997), Danish singer, songwriter and producer
- U-Roy (1942–2021), Jamaican vocalist
- Urthboy, Australian hip hop MC and producer
- Uru, Japanese singer-songwriter
- Urvashi (born 1966), Indian actress
- USO (aka U$O) (born 1981), Danish rapper
- Uzari (born 1991), Belarusian singer and songwriter
- Uzi (born 1998), Turkish rapper and songwriter
- Uzi (born 1999), French rapper and singer

== V ==
- V (born 1995), South Korean singer and actor
- Vaali (1931–2013), Indian lyricist and actor
- Vacío (born 1998), Russian rapper
- Vadivelu (born 1960), Indian actor and singer
- Vado (born 1985), American rapper
- Vaï (born 1979), Moroccan-born Canadian rapper
- Vaiyapuri (born 1968), Indian comedian and actor
- Vajramuni (1944–2006), Indian actor
- Vakero (born 1981), Dominican singer and rapper
- Vakill (born 1975), American rapper
- Vald (born 1992), French rapper
- Valdy (born 1945), Canadian singer-songwriter and musician
- Valensia (born 1971), Dutch singer, composer, producer and musician
- Valentina (born 1991), American drag performer and singer
- Valeriya (born 1968), Russian singer
- Valete, Portuguese hip hop artist
- Valiente (born 1974), Mexican professional wrestler
- Valtònyc (born 1993), Spanish rapper
- Valshe (born 1986), Japanese singer
- Valya (born 1978), Bulgarian singer
- Vamba (1860–1920), Italian author
- Vampira (1922–2008), Finnish-American actress and television personality
- Vampiro (born 1967), Canadian professional wrestler
- Vangelis (1943–2022), Greek composer
- Vangelis (born 1981), Mexican professional wrestler
- Vanisri, Indian actress
- Vanity (1959–2016), Canadian entertainer
- Vanna (born 1970), Croatian singer
- VanVelzen (born 1978), Dutch singer-songwriter
- Varien (born 1990), American composer, producer and multi-instrumentalist
- VASA (born 2004), Nigerian singer and songwriter
- Vassy (born 1983), Greek-Australian singer-songwriter
- Vava (born 1995), Chinese rapper and singer
- Vector (born 1984), Nigerian rapper and songwriter
- Veena (1926–2004), Indian actress
- Veera (born 1983), Indian actor
- Veeran, Indian actor
- Veeze (born 1995), American rapper, singer and songwriter
- Vega (born 1979), Spanish singer-songwriter
- Vegedream (born 1992), French hip hop, R&B and urban pop singer-songwriter
- Velous, American rapper, singer, songwriter and record producer
- Velvet (born 1975), Swedish singer
- Veneno (born 1970), Panamanian professional wrestler
- Veny (born 1998), Japanese professional wrestler
- Verbal (born 1975), Japanese rapper, music video director and record producer
- Verbs, American Christian hip hop artist
- Versatile, American record producer, songwriter and remixer
- Vertelli (1840–1914), British-Australian tightrope walker and stage magician
- Vertexguy (born 1979), American musician
- VertVixen, American professional wrestler
- Vezirja (born 1991), Albanian actor and drag queen
- Vicious, American rapper and reggae artist
- Victony (born 2001), Nigerian singer, songwriter and rapper
- Vigalantee, American emcee and speaker
- Vignesh (born 1971), Indian actor
- Vijay (born 1974), Tamil actor and playback singer
- Vijayakanth (1952–2023), Indian actor
- Vijayakumar (born 1943), Tamil film actor and politician
- Vijayasree (1953–1974), Indian actress
- Vikram (born 1966), Indian actor and playback singer
- Viktor (born 1980), Canadian professional wrestler
- Viktoria (born 1970), Filipino singer
- Viktorija (born 1958), Serbian singer
- Viktory, American Christian rapper, songwriter and record producer
- VillaBanks (born 2000), Italian rapper
- Vinayan (born 1959), Indian director and producer, mainly of Malayalam movies
- Vincino (1946–2018), Italian cartoonist
- Vinka (born 1993), Ugandan musical artist, dancer, singer and songwriter
- Vinni (born 1976), Norwegian musician and hip hop artist
- Vinxen (born 2000), South Korean rapper
- Vinz (born 1992), Albanian rapper
- Violencia (born 1968), Mexican professional wrestler
- Violetta (1905/1906–1940), German-American singer and performer
- Viper (1959–2010), American pornographic actress
- Viper (born 1971), American rapper, record producer and actor
- Viraat (born 1989), Indian actor, dancer and singer
- Virgil (1951–2024), American wrestler and actor
- Virtuoso, American rapper
- Virus (born 1968), Mexican wrestler
- Viruta (1919–1996), Mexican comedian, actor and singer
- Visa (born 1988), Mexican drag queen
- Viscera (1971–2014), American professional wrestler
- Vishnuvardhan (1950–2009), Indian film actor
- Visto (born 1993), American rapper and singer-songwriter
- Vitaa (born 1983), French singer
- Vitas (born 1979), Russian singer-songwriter and actor
- Viva (born 1938), American actress, writer and Warhol superstar
- Vivacious, Jamaican-American drag queen
- Vizin, American drag queen and singer
- Voli, Finnish rapper
- Voltaire (born 1967), Cuban-born American musician
- Vomir (born 1973), French noise music artist
- Vory (born 1997), American rapper, singer and songwriter
- Voyage (born 2001), Serbian singer and actor
- VTEN (born 1996), Nepalese rapper and actor
- Vudumane (born 1974), Ghanaian-Nigerian singer, rapper and songwriter
- Vybe, Australian drag performer
- Vysakh (born 1980), Indian film director

== W ==
- Waajeed, American rapper and producer
- Waldjinah (born 1945), Indonesian traditional singer
- Wale (born 1984), American hip hop artist
- Walkie (1995–2022), Russian hip-hop artist and battle rapper
- Wallen (born 1978), French singer
- Wando (1945–2012), Brazilian singer-songwriter
- Wanz (born 1961), American singer, songwriter and rapper
- Warhorse, American professional wrestler
- Warrior (1959–2014), American wrestler
- Watermät, French DJ, musician and record producer
- Watt (born 1990), American record producer and singer-songwriter
- Wawa, Malagasy performer and composer
- Wawa (born 1964), Taiwanese singer-songwriter
- Wawesh, Kenyan hip-hop artist and producer
- Wax, American rapper and comedian
- Wax (born 1976), South Korean singer
- Waylon (born 1980), Dutch singer
- Wayna, Ethiopian-born American R&B/soul singer and songwriter
- WC (born 1970), American rapper and actor
- Webbie (born 1985), American rapper
- Webster (born 1979), Canadian hip hop artist and TV show host
- Weebee, Canadian drag performer
- Weegee (1899–1968), American photojournalist and filmmaker
- Wem, American hip hop artist and music video director
- Wendy (born 1994), South Korean singer
- Werenoi (1994–2025), French rapper
- Werrason (born 1965), Congolese singer-songwriter, composer and producer
- Wess (1945–2009), American-born Italian singer
- WestBam (born 1965), German DJ and musician
- Wetryk (1890–1936), Italian magician
- Wheezy (born 1992), American record producer and songwriter
- Whethan (born 1999), American DJ and music producer
- Whigfield (born 1970), Danish singer
- WhoIsParadise (born 1973), British rapper and songwriter
- Wifisfuneral (born 1997), American rapper
- Wifiskeleton (2003–2025), American musician and YouTuber
- Wigor (born 1977), Polish rapper and producer
- Wiki (born 1993), American rapper and record producer
- Wildchild (born 1973), American rapper
- Wildstylez (born 1983), Dutch DJ and record producer
- Wiley (born 1979), British MC and music producer
- Will (born 1999), Italian singer-songwriter
- will.i.am (born 1975), American rapper, singer, songwriter and record producer
- Winne (born 1978), Dutch rapper
- Winter (born 2001), South Korean singer and dancer
- Wise (born 1979), Japanese hip hop musician
- Wisin (born 1978), Puerto Rican reggaeton rapper, singer and record producer
- Wisp, American shoegaze musician
- Wiu (born 2002), Brazilian rapper, singer and songwriter
- Wizkid (born 1990), Nigerian singer and songwriter
- WizTheMc (born 1999), South African-German rapper, record producer and songwriter
- WizzyPro, Nigerian record producer
- Wolfgang (born 1986), Scottish professional wrestler
- Wombat, Australian singer and rapper
- WondaGurl (born 1996), Canadian record producer and songwriter
- Wonho (born 1993), South Korean singer
- Wonstein (born 1995), South Korean rapper and singer
- Woodkid (born 1983), French music video director, graphic designer and singer-songwriter
- Woody (born 1992), South Korean singer and songwriter
- Woodz (born 1996), South Korean singer-songwriter, rapper and record producer
- Wookie (born 1969), British musician
- Wooli, American DJ and producer
- Woozi (born 1996), South Korean singer, songwriter and record producer
- Wordburglar, Canadian hip hop artist
- Wordplay (born 1984), British musician and actor
- Wordsplayed (born 1979), American Christian rapper
- Wordsworth, American hip-hop musician and emcee
- Worldwide (born 1986), American rapper, emcee, music producer and hip hop artist
- WOS, Argentine singer, actor and freestyler
- Wrekonize (born 1983), American rapper
- Wuki (born 1984), American musician, record producer and DJ
- Wunmi, Nigerian-British singer and dancer
- ₩uNo (born 1990), South Korean rapper, singer, songwriter and record producer
- Würzel (1949–2011), English musician
- Wuv (born 1974), American musician

== X ==
- Xamã (born 1989), Brazilian rapper, singer and actor
- Xana, Canadian drag performer
- Xandee (born 1978), Belgian singer
- Xander (born 1988), Danish pop singer and songwriter
- Xanman (born 2000), American rapper
- Xatar (1981–2025), Kurdish-born German rapper
- Xavi, American singer-songwriter
- Xavier (1977–2020), American professional wrestler
- Xaviersobased (born 2003), American rapper and record producer
- XIA (born 1986), South Korean singer-songwriter
- Xilhouete, Filipino drag performer
- Xiumin (born 1990), South Korean singer
- Xiyeon (born 2000), South Korean singer
- Xonia (born 1989), Australian singer-songwriter, actress and dancer
- X-Pac (born 1972), American professional wrestler
- Xperience (born 1984), American hip hop recording artist
- Xpert (born 1990), Azerbaijani rapper and songwriter
- xSDTRK (born 1988), Canadian writer, producer and artist
- Xuxa (born 1963), Brazilian TV hostess, actress and singer
- XXXTentacion (1998–2018), American rapper, singer and songwriter
- Xzibit (born 1974), American rapper, actor and television personality

== Y ==
- Yaire (born 1977), Puerto Rican singer-songwriter
- Yaiya (born 1990), Swedish artist, songwriter and actor
- Yallunder (1994–2025), South African singer and songwriter
- Yamato (born 1981), Japanese professional wrestler
- Yamê (born 1993), French-Cameroonian singer and songwriter
- Yameen, American hip hop producer
- Yamy (born 1991), Chinese singer, rapper and dancer
- Yana (1931–1989), British singer
- Yandel (born 1977), Puerto Rican singer and songwriter
- Yangpa (born 1979), South Korean singer
- Yanix (born 1993), Russian hip-hop artist
- Yanni (born 1954), Greek-American musician
- Yanni (born 1978), Filipino singer and musician
- Yara (born 1983), Lebanese singer
- Yas (born 1982), Iranian rapper
- Yasmin (1936–2026), Pakistani actress
- Yasmine (1972–2009), Belgian singer and TV presenter
- Yazz (born 1960), British singer and model
- Ycee (born 1993), Nigerian rapper, singer and songwriter
- Yeat (born 2000), American rapper, singer and songwriter
- Yehonathan (born 1977), Israeli singer
- Yelawolf (born 1979), American rapper
- Yellowman (born 1956), Jamaican musician, songwriter and DJ
- Yenesi (born 2000), Spanish singer, artist, social media personality and drag performer
- Yepha (born 1983), Danish, singer, rapper and hip hop artist
- Yeri (born 1999), South Korean singer and actress
- Yesung (born 1984), South Korean singer, songwriter, actor, radio personality and television presenter
- Yezi (born 1994), South Korean rapper and singer
- YG (born 1990), American rapper
- YGTUT (born 1991), American rapper, singer and record producer
- Yhapojj (born 2003), American rapper and songwriter
- Yiruma (born 1978), South Korean pianist and composer
- Yizzy (born 1999), English grime MC
- YL (born 1996), French rapper
- Yodelice (born 1979), French singer-songwriter
- Yoh (born 1988), Japanese professional wrestler
- YOHIO (born 1995), Japanese-Swedish singer
- Yokozuna (1966–2000), American wrestler
- Yola (born 1983), English singer-songwriter, musician and actress
- Yomo (born 1980), American reggaeton singer
- Yoñlu (1989–2006), Brazilian singer-songwriter
- YooA (born 1995), South Korean singer and actress
- Yoona (born 1990), South Korean singer, actress, model and dancer
- Yoshika (born 1983), Japanese singer
- You (born 1964), Japanese model, TV personality, singer and actress
- Youddiph (born 1973), Russian singer
- Youngohm (born 1998), Thai Hip-Hop singer
- Youngr (born 1989), British singer, songwriter, producer and musician
- YoungstaCPT (born 1991), South African rapper, lyricist and songwriter
- Yousra (born 1950), Egyptian actress and singer
- Youth (born 1960), British musician and record producer
- Yovanna (born 1940), Greek singer
- Yo-Yo (born 1971), rapper, songwriter, actress and entrepreneur
- yozuca*, Japanese singer
- YTCracker (born 1982), American rapper
- Yuca (1951–2026), Peruvian actor and comedian
- Yuhi (born 1995), Japanese professional wrestler
- Yuju (born 1997), South Korean singer-songwriter
- Yuke, American rapper and record producer
- yukihiro (born 1968), Japanese musician
- Yukmouth (born 1974), rapper
- Yuksek (born 1977), French electronic music producer, remixer, singer and DJ
- Yūmao (born 1980), Japanese singer-songwriter
- Yumdda (born 1984), South Korean rapper and VJ
- Yuna (born 1986), Malaysian singer-songwriter
- Yungblud (born 1997), English singer-songwriter, musician and actor
- Yungen (born 1992), British rapper, singer and songwriter
- YungManny (born 2003), American rapper
- Yungun, British hip-hop artist
- Yunhway (born 1995), South Korean rapper
- Yuni (born 2008), Japanese professional wrestler
- Yura (born 1992), South Korean actress and singer
- Yurena (born 1969), Spanish singer
- Yuri (born 1976), South Korean pop singer
- Yuri (born 1964), Mexican singer and actress
- Yuria (born 1967), Japanese singer and guitarist
- Yurin (born 1981), Japanese voice actress, actress and singer
- Yusa, Cuban singer-songwriter
- Yuu (born 1991), Japanese professional wrestler
- Yuuri (born 1994), Japanese singer-songwriter
- YuuRI (born 1997), Japanese professional wrestler
- Yves (born 1997), South Korean singer and producer
- yvngxchris (born 2004), American rapper
- YZ, American rapper
- Yzalú (born 1982), Brazilian singer-songwriter and guitarist

== Z ==
- Żabson (born 1994), Polish rapper and songwriter
- Zacarias (1934–1990), Brazilian actor and comedian
- Zachg (born 1981), American hip hop artist
- Zacke (born 1983), Swedish rapper
- Zahara (1987–2023), South African singer-songwriter
- Zaho (born 1980), Algerian-Canadian singer
- Zalek (1995–2026), Colombian singer and composer
- Zaq (born 1988), Japanese singer, lyricist, composer and arranger
- Zara (born 1976), Turkish singer and actress
- Zara (born 1983), Russian pop singer and actress
- Zavaidoc (1896–1945), Romanian singer
- Zaytoven (born 1980), American record producer, DJ and pianist
- Zaz (born 1980), French singer
- Zazie (born 1964), French singer-songwriter
- Zea (born 1991), Slovak television actress, singer and choreographer
- Zeba (born 1945), Pakistani actress
- Zedd (born 1989), Russian-German DJ, record producer and songwriter
- Zeebee (born 1965), German-born Austrian singer-songwriter and producer
- Zeebra (born 1971), Japanese hip hop artist
- Zelo (born 1996), South Korean rapper and singer
- ZelooperZ (born 1993), American rapper
- Zemmoa (born 1986), Mexican singer-songwriter and musical artist
- Zera (born 2002), Serbian-Austrian singer and songwriter
- Zerb (born 1997), Brazilian DJ and record producer
- Zeus (born 1982), Japanese professional wrestler
- Zeuxis (born 1988), Puerto Rican professional wrestler
- Z'EV (1951–2017), American poet and sound artist
- Zeyne (born 1997), Palestinian-Jordanian singer, songwriter, musician and producer
- Zia (born 1986), South Korean singer
- Ziak, French rapper
- Zico (born 1992), South Korean singer-songwriter, rapper and music producer
- ZieZie (born 1998), British rapper and singer
- Zifou (born 1992), French rapper of Moroccan origin
- Zilla, American rapper and producer
- ZillaKami (born 1999), American rapper, singer and songwriter
- Zíngaro (born 1949), Spanish singer
- Zizo (born 1986), South Korean rapper
- ZK (born 2000), Danish rapper
- Zlatan (born 1994), Nigerian rapper and singer
- Zombo (1979–2008), South African singer-songwriter and music producer
- Zomboy (born 1989), English DJ and music producer
- Zomby (born 1980), British electronic musician
- Zorja (born 1996), Serbian singer-songwriter
- Zoro (born 1962), American drummer
- Zoro (born 1990), Nigerian rapper and singer
- Zouzou (born 1943), Algerian model, actress and singer
- Zoxea (born 1974), French rapper
- Z-Ro (born 1977), American rapper
- Zucchero (born 1955), Italian singer
- Zuleyma (born 1964), Mexican professional wrestler
- Zuluboy (born 1976), South African actor and musician
- Zumbido (born 1974), Mexican professional wrestler
- Zuna (born 1993), Lebanese-German rapper
- Zuzzurro (1946–2013), Italian actor and comedian
- Zyra (born 1994), English singer, songwriter and record producer
- ZZONE (born 1999), South Korean musician

== Numbers and other characters ==
- 2pac (1971–1996), American rapper
- 24kGoldn (born 2000), American singer-songwriter
- 6025 (born 1958/1959), American musician
- 6ix9ine (born 1996), American rapper
- Au5 (born 1992), American electronic music producer
- bbno$ (born 1995), Canadian rapper
- KA$HDAMI (born 2004), American rapper
- Ty$ (born 1982), American rapper
- $ofaygo (born 2001), American rapper and singer
- μ-Ziq (born 1971), English musician

== See also ==
- List of legally mononymous people
- List of pseudonyms
- List of stage names
- Mononymous person
- Pen name
- Ring name
- Stage name
