= Phashara =

American rapper

Phashara is an American rapper from the West Side of Chicago, Illinois. He is a founding member and one fourth of Chicago rap group the Beatmonstas which consists of himself and fellow rappers Noble Dru, Therapy & Diamond Back. He is also a member of rap group Sac.Fly. He was born and raised on Chicago's West Side. He attended Lake View High School on Chicago's North Side. He went on to attend Columbia College in Downtown Chicago where he began frequenting Chicago's underground hip-hop scene.

The name Phashara is a mash-up of three names that he used during his formative younger emcee years. At a time when rap music was afro centric Phashara sported “Pharaoh” as his stage name. Shortly thereafter, he and a group of friends began to study Islam at which time Phashara toyed with the idea of legally changing his name to Shaquell Rashid. Eventually settling on an amalgamation of the three names by using the first few letters each, Phashara was born.

Phashara's profile grew in the 90's as a part of Chicago-based rap group Sac.Fly. The group included rappers Phashara & Bosa and producer / DJ Trust. The group recorded several LPs between 1993 and 1999. The LPs were never officially released to the public. SAC.FLY parted ways by 2000.

Eventually, Phashara began to produce his own music in pursuit of a solo career. As Phashara prepped his debut solo LP for release, he joined forces with Noble Dru, Diamond Back & Therapy to form the group Beatmonstas and subsequently the label, Beatmonstas Entertainment. Shortly thereafter, Phashara and Noble Dru launched the label with a compilation release rather than a solo release which gave way to “The 3rd Weapon”. The 3rd Weapon was licensed from Beatmonstas Entertainment for distribution in the UK & Ireland by Mindlab Recordings / Southern Record Distributors in 2006.

In July 2008, Phashara's debut solo project “The Storybook Adventure” was released independently on Beatmonstas Entertainment. The Storybook Adventure features production by Phashara himself, Radius (Neighborhood Suicide, LP), Noble Dru (The 3rd Weapon, LP) & Tall Black Guy (Path Finders, 80's Babies). The Storybook also features appearances from Bosa, Noble Dru & Therapy.

== Discography ==
- 1993: Phat Bigg - Vibe Percent (USBF2)- unreleased
- 1995: DapperCore - SAC.FLY (Club House) - Leaked / unofficially released
- 1998: Big Faces - SAC.FLY (Glasshouse Entertainment) - unreleased
- 2005: The 3rd Weapon - Beatmonstas / Various Artists (Beatmonstas Entertainment)
- 2005: Four-Four 12 inch (US)- Beatmonstas(Beatmonstas Entertainment)
- 2006: The 3rd Weapon - Beatmonstas / Various Artists (Mindlab Recordings / Southern Record Distributors)
- 2006: Let's Talk About Love 12 inch (UK) - Beatmonstas (Mindlab Recordings / Southern Record Distributors)
- 2008: Young World b/w OPM (Other People's Money) Digital 12 inch - Phashara (Beatmonstas Entertainment)
- 2008: The Storybook Adventure - Phashara (Beatmonstas Entertainment)
- 2008: Let's Go (EP)- Beatmonstas (Beatmonstas Entertainment)
- 2009: Bomb 'Til We Hit 'Em (LP)- Beatmonstas (Beatmonstas Entertainment)
- 2010: Burning Hot Digital 12"- Phashara (Beatmonstas Entertainment)
- 2012: Pathways (EP)- Phashara (Beatmonstas Entertainment)
