= West Garfield Park, Chicago =

Community area in Chicago, Illinois

West Garfield Park
- Community area
- Community Area 26 - West Garfield Park
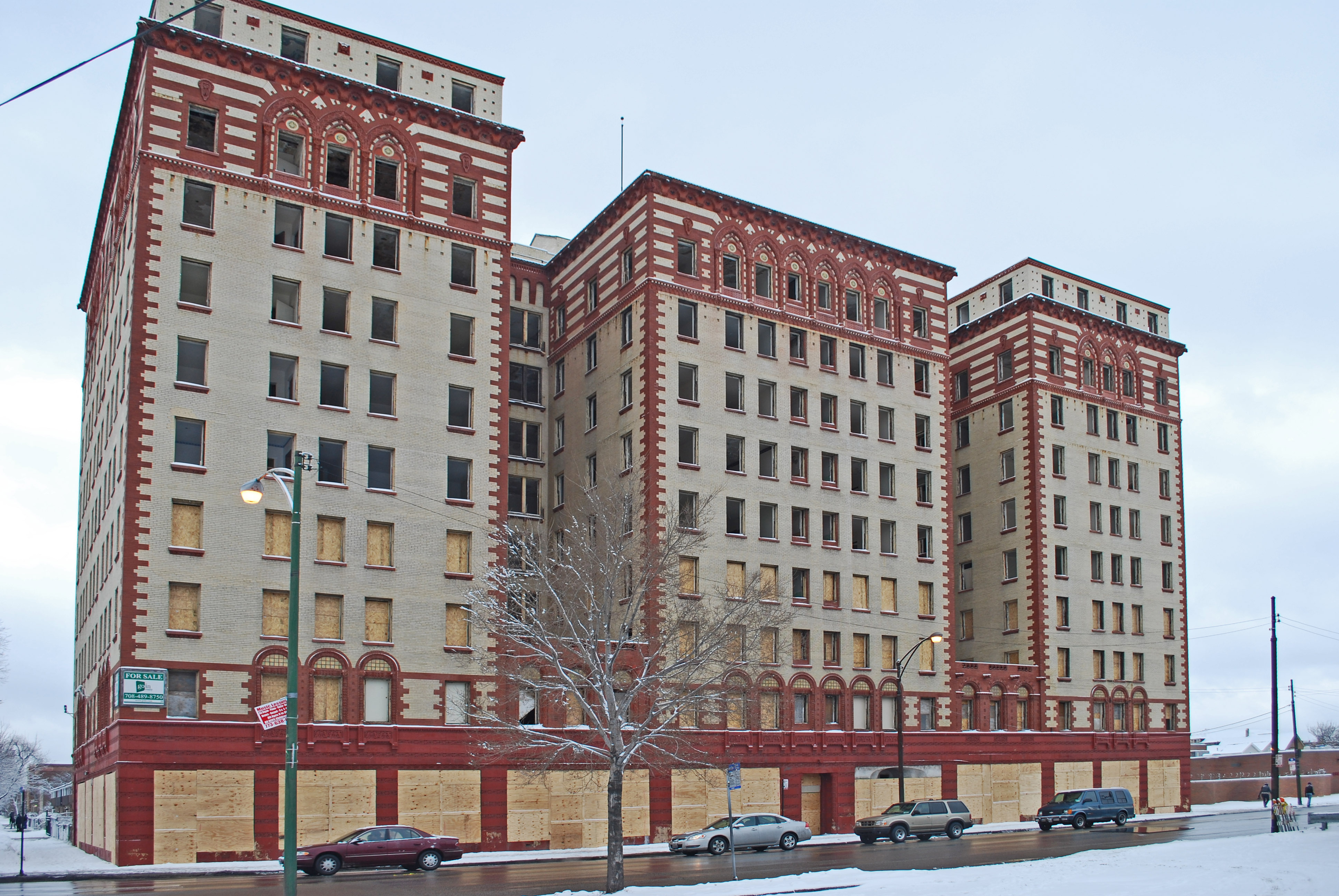
- The abandoned Guyon Hotel, on the NRHP.

- Location within the city of Chicago
- Coordinates: 41°52.8′N 87°43.8′W
- Country: United States
- State: Illinois
- County: Cook
- City: Chicago
- Neighborhoods: list: West Garfield Park

Area
  - Total: 1.28 sq mi (3.32 km^{2})

Population (2024)
  - Total: 15,096
  - Density: 11,800/sq mi (4,550/km^{2})

Demographics 2024
  - White: 1.2%
  - Black: 89.1%
  - Hispanic: 8.3%
  - Asian: 0.7%
  - Other: 0.7%
- Time zone: UTC-6 (CST)
  - Summer (DST): UTC-5 (CDT)
- ZIP Codes: parts of 60624
- Median household income (2020): $29,443
- Source: U.S. Census, Record Information Services

West Garfield Park is one of the 77 officially-designated community areas of Chicago in Illinois, United States. It is located on the West Side of Chicago. It is directly west of Garfield Park.

== K-Town ==
K-Town is a nickname for an area in Humboldt Park, North Lawndale, and West Garfield Park. Although these long streets extend beyond the bounds of North Lawndale, and West Garfield Park, published sources identify the name K-Town as referring specifically to an area of North Lawndale, and West Garfield Park, i.e. the area through which these streets pass. between Pulaski Road and Cicero Avenue in which the names of many north-south avenues begin with the letter K (Keystone, Karlov, Kedvale, Keeler, Kenneth, Kilbourn, Kildare, Kolin, Kolmar, Komensky, Kostner, Kilpatrick, Kenton, Knox, and Keating). The pattern is a historical relic of a 1913 street-naming proposal, by which streets were to be systematically named according to their distance from the Illinois-Indiana border; K, the eleventh letter, was to be assigned to streets within the eleventh mile, counting west from the state line. The eleventh mile is the easternmost area in which the plan was widely implemented, as many neighborhoods to the east were already developed and had street names in place. The portion of K-Town bounded by W. Kinzie St, W. Cermak Rd, S. Kostner Ave, and S. Pulaski Rd was listed as a historic district on the National Register of Historic Places on September 9, 2010.

== Government and infrastructure ==
The United States Postal Service operates the Mary Alice Henry Post Office at 4222 West Madison Street.

Bethel New Life, Inc. is a main community service provider to the area.

The Chicago Tool Library is headquartered in the area.

== Education ==
In 2024, 10.5 percent of adults over the age of 25 had a bachelor's degree or higher, an increase from 5.0 percent in 2000. 77.7 percent of adults had graduated high school, an increase from 58.0 percent in 2000.

== Transportation ==
Two of the Chicago Transit Authority's train lines, the Blue Line and the Green Line, serve this neighborhood. The Green Line has an elevated station at Pulaski, and the Blue Line has a station in the median of the Eisenhower Expressway, also at Pulaski.

Historical population
Census	Pop.	Note	%±
1930	50,014		—
1940	48,447		−3.1%
1950	48,443		0.0%
1960	45,661		−5.7%
1970	48,459		6.1%
1980	33,865		−30.1%
1990	24,095		−28.8%
2000	23,019		−4.5%
2010	18,001		−21.8%
2020	17,433		−3.2%

== Crime ==
The neighborhood's 21 murders in 2014 occurred at a rate of 116 per 100,000, giving this neighborhood the highest murder rate in Chicago. In a city that sees 2,000 shootings per annum, they occur in West Garfield Park at a rate of 411 per 100,000.

In 2016, the violence increased further, with a total of 31 murders, resulting in a murder rate of 172 per 100,000. Additionally, at least 172 people were shot during 2016, resulting in a shooting rate of 950 per 100,000 people.

In 2025, the homicide rate had dropped to a rate of 79.39 per 100,000 with 13 homicides alongside its 16,374 residents.
