= West Side, Chicago =

Western part of Chicago, Illinois, US

West Side
- District
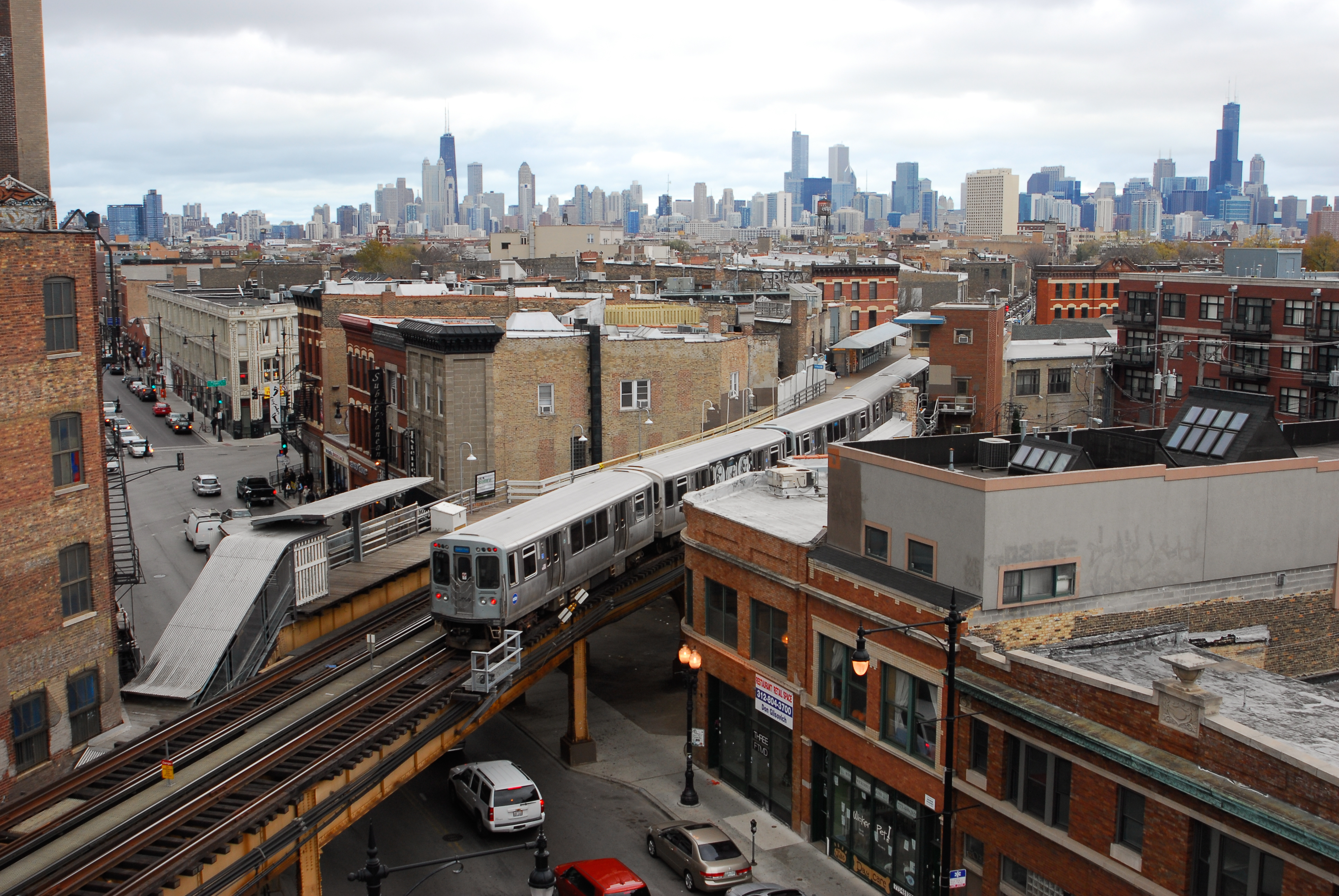
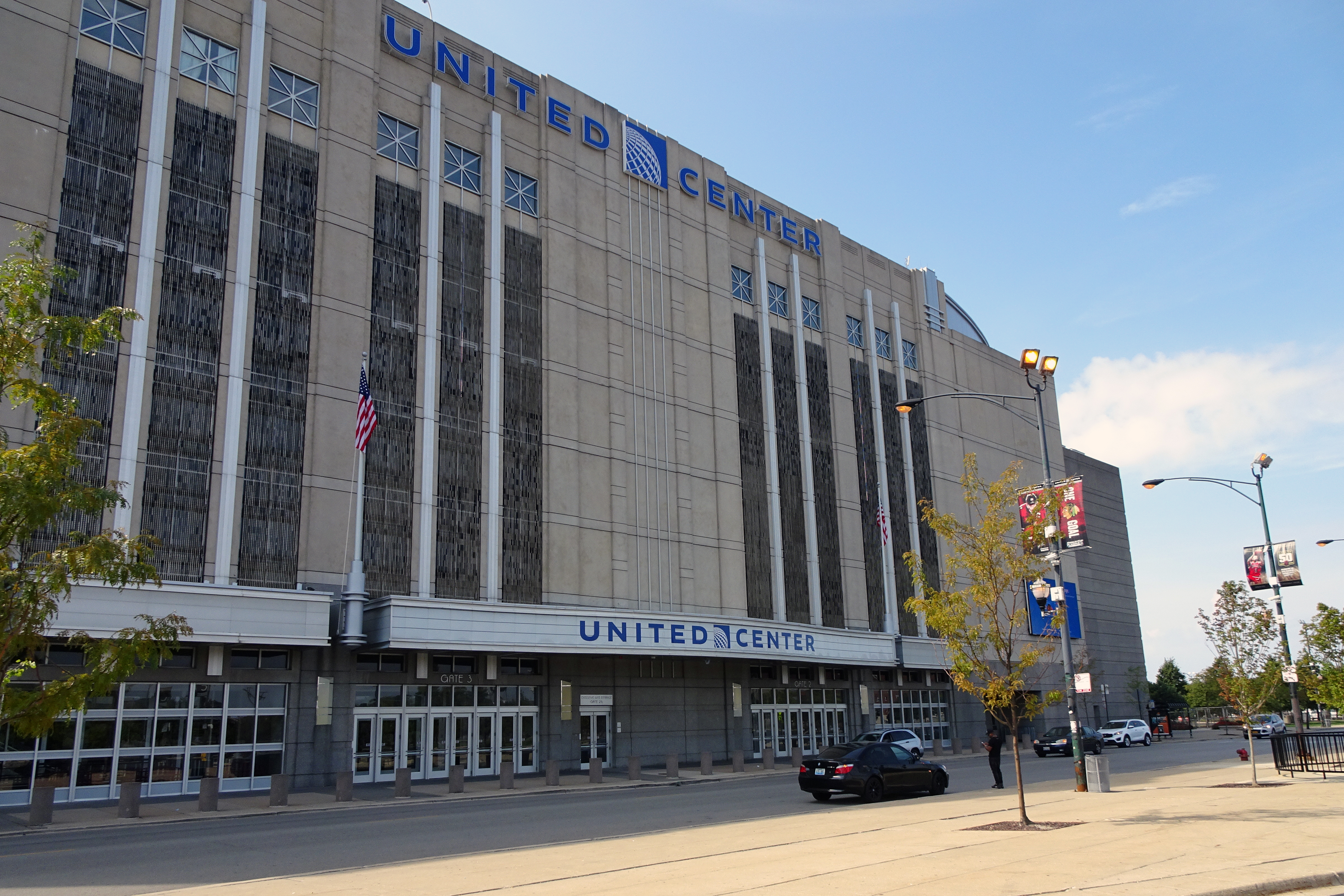
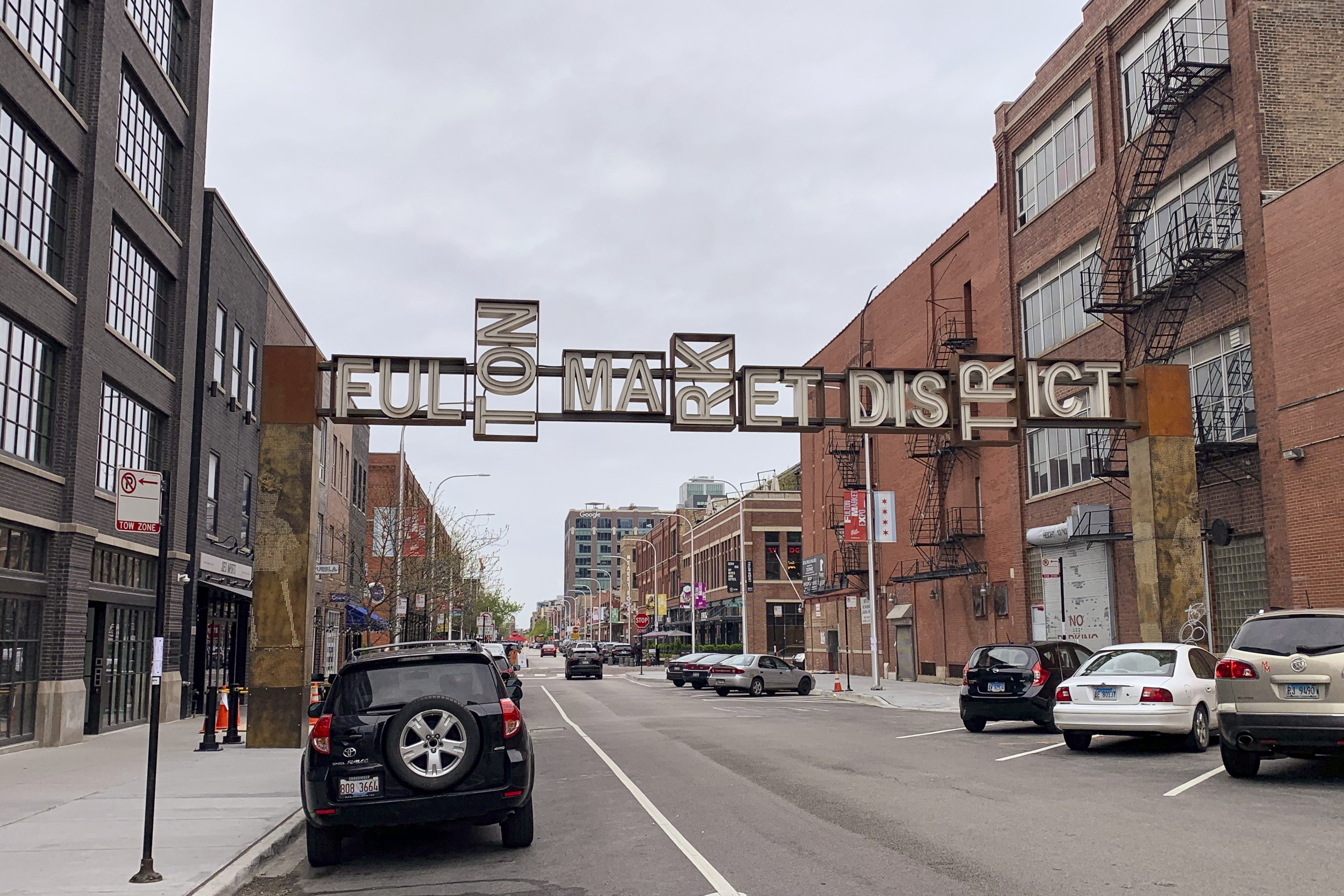
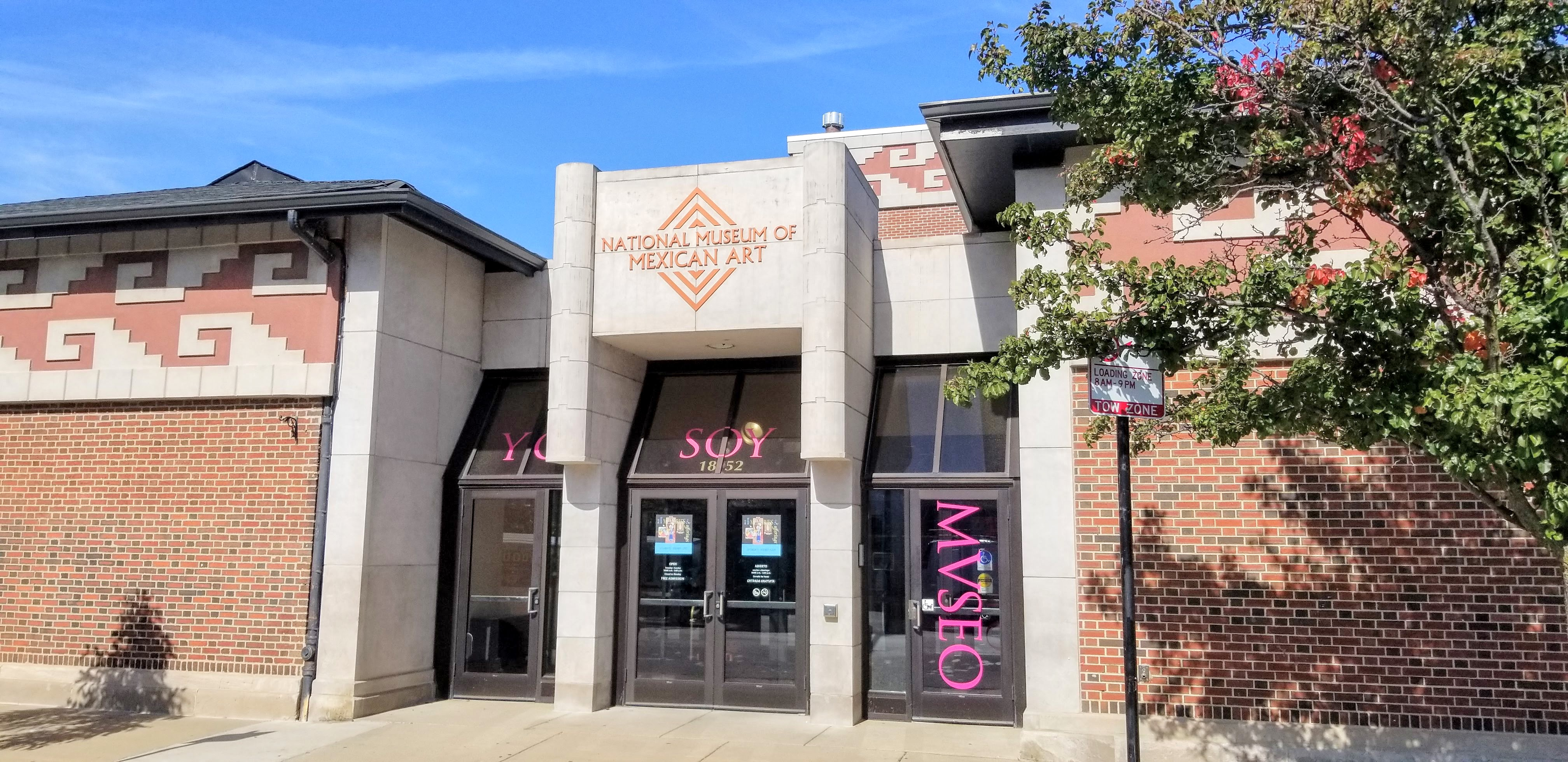
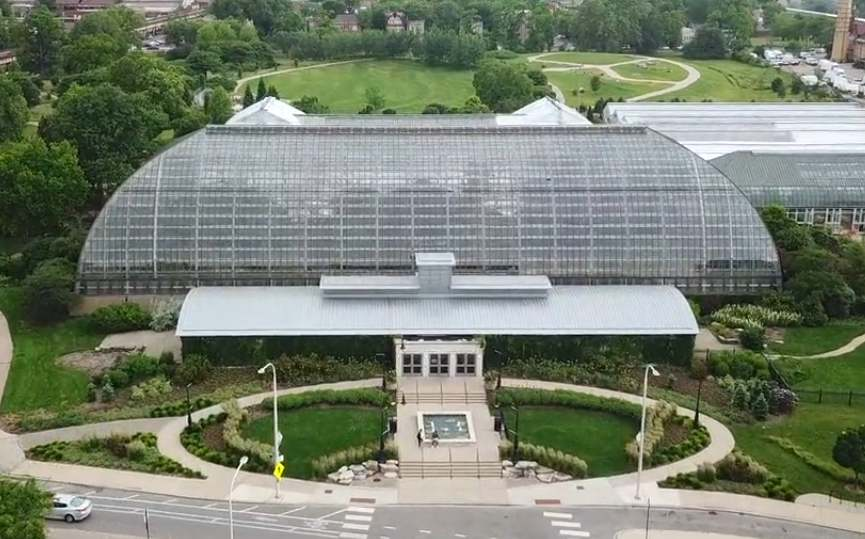
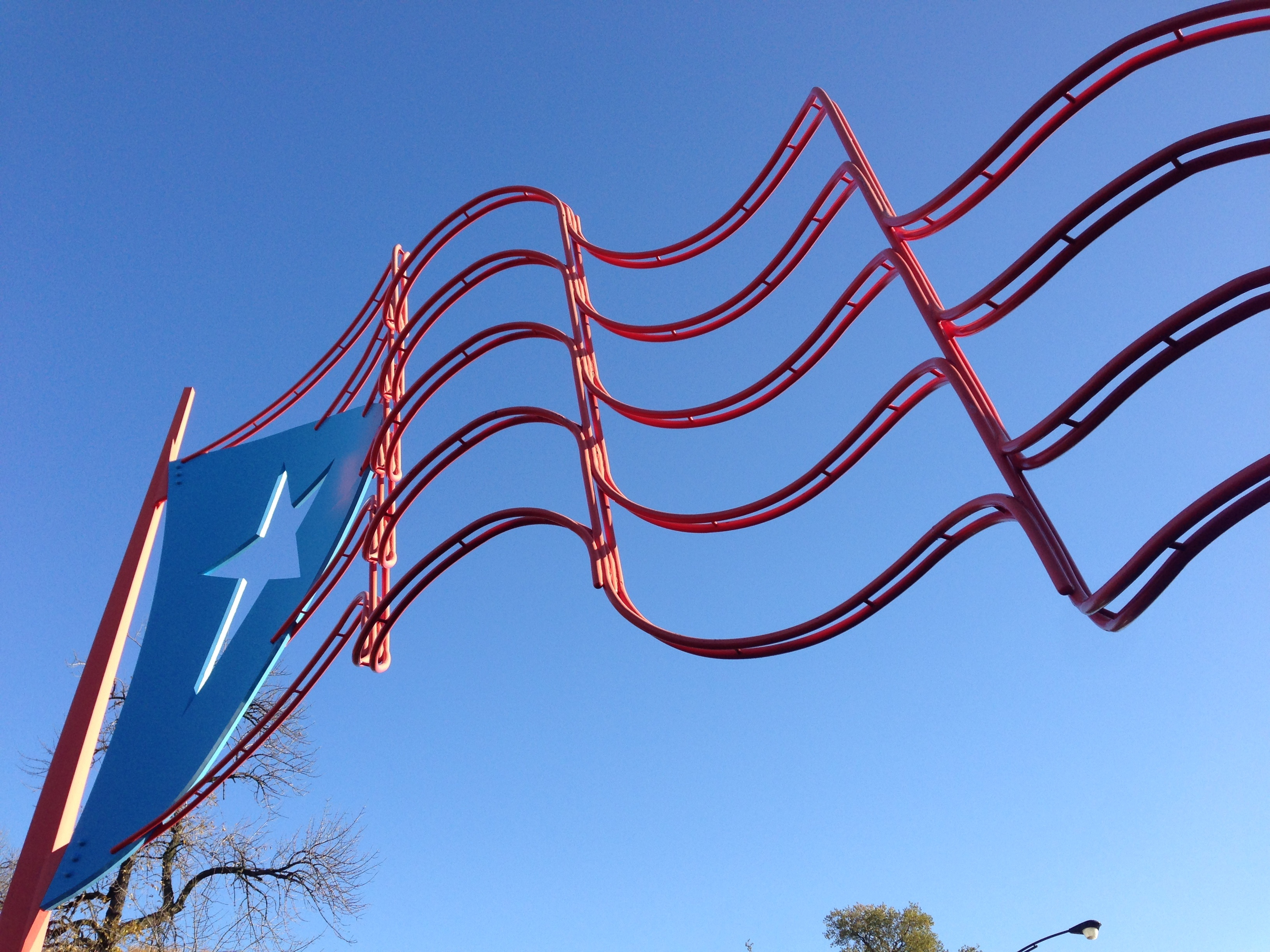
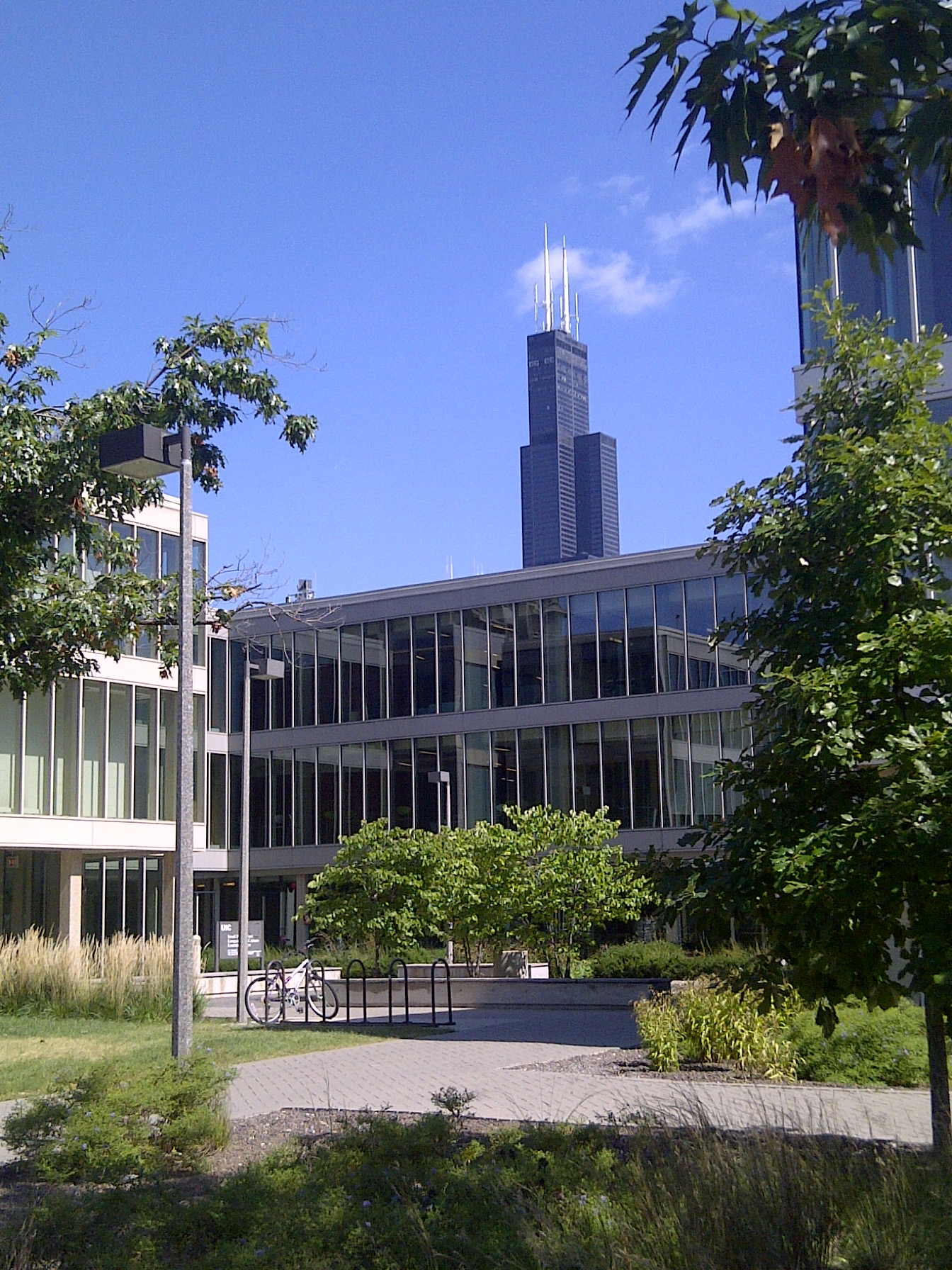
- Wicker Park United Center Fulton Market District National Museum of Mexican Art Garfield Park Conservatory Puerto Rican metal flag, Humboldt Park University of Illinois at Chicago
- Interactive map of West Side
- Coordinates: 41.8671°N 87.6216°W
- Country: United States
- State: Illinois
- County: Cook
- City: Chicago
- Time zone: UTC−06:00 (CST)
  - Summer (DST): UTC−05:00 (CDT)

The West Side is one of the three major geographical "sides" of the city of Chicago, Illinois, United States. The others are the North Side and South Side. The West Side contains communities that are of historical and cultural importance to the history and development of Chicago. On the flag of Chicago, the West Side is represented by the central white stripe.

The West Side has gone through many transitions in its ethnic and socioeconomic makeup due to its historic role as a gateway for immigrants and migrants as well as its role for funneling poorer African-American residents away from the wealthier lakeside neighborhoods and central business district. Historically the Great Chicago Fire of 1871 started on the West Side before consuming much of the then city, and Jane Addams of Hull House brought international attention to the West Side in the late 19th and early 20th centuries. At the same time, some of Chicago's grandest parks and boulevards were laid out on the West Side. Today, the West Side consists of large mixed communities of middle class, working class, and low-income African American, Puerto Rican, and Mexican residents; some small communities of blue-collar, lower middle class and middle class white residents of historically Polish, Italian, Czech, Russian Jewish, and Greek, descent; and newer communities of middle-class, upper-middle class, and wealthy white residents created by gentrification. Major shifts continue to happen due to forces such as rapid gentrification, selective corporate investments, and new investments in neighborhoods like Austin, Chicago ustin.

There are a range of services available on the West Side, especially educational, cultural, and medical institutions. The University of Illinois at Chicago is Near West Side, and further west the United Center, home to the Chicago Bulls and Chicago Blackhawks. One of the nation's largest urban medical districts, the Illinois Medical District, is on the West Side. Three of Chicago's largest parks, along with much of the city's boulevard system, are in this part of the city: Humboldt Park, Garfield Park, and Douglass Park. The West Side is very accessible by the interstate and public transportation via the Chicago Transit Authority's many bus routes, the Chicago 'L', the Metra commuter rail, and the Eisenhower Expressway. Additionally, Cook County Jail, the United States' largest single site jail, and the Homan Square facility, maintained by the Chicago Police Department, are both on the West Side.

== Boundaries ==
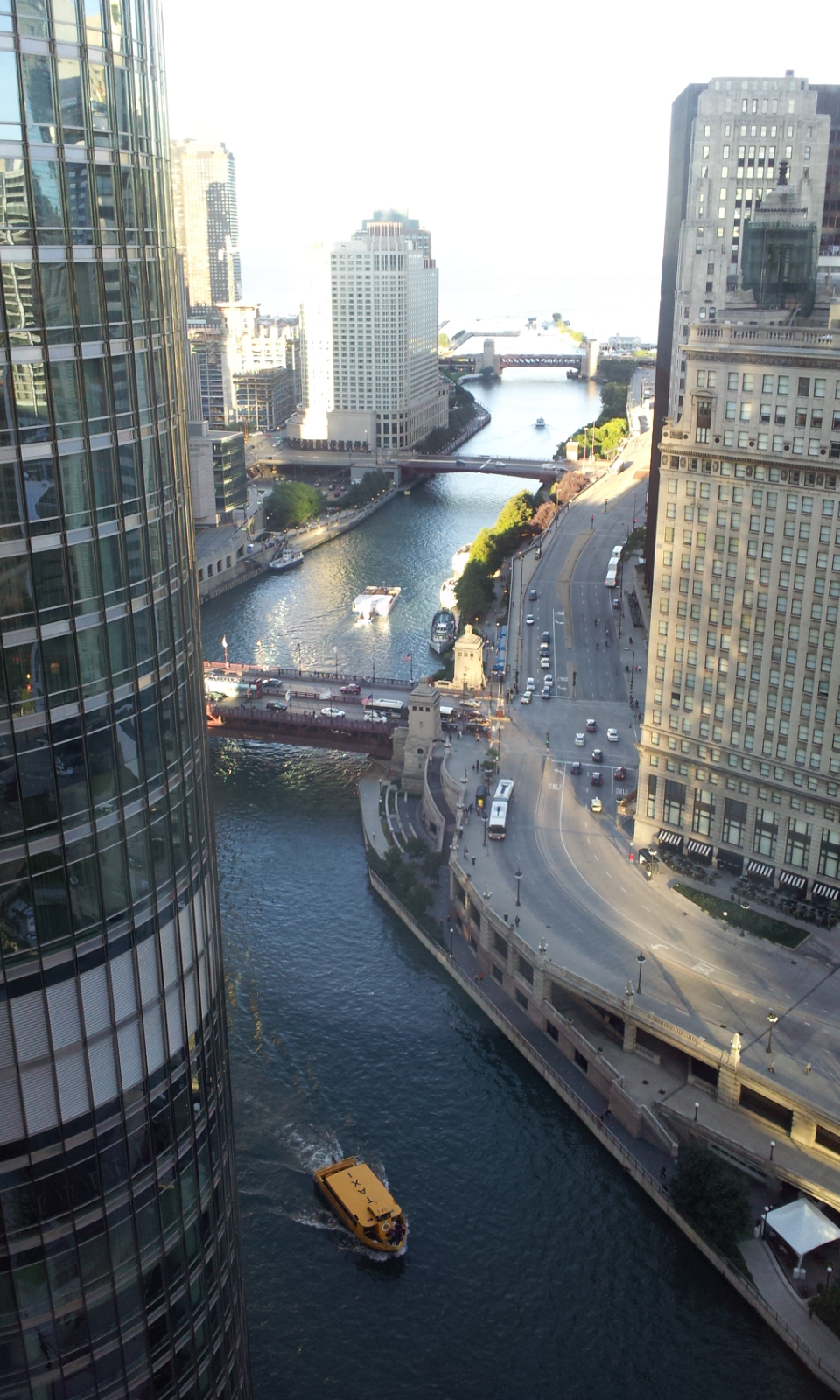
The Chicago River set the historical boundaries of the "sides" of the city.

As with the other sides of the city, there is no consensus as to the exact boundaries of the West Side. The city's annexation of land beyond the original western border at Wood Street gave way to the development of the West Side. The city legislature added more land in 1869 through the annexation of West Town area, and the rest of the area was absorbed in 1899 through the annexation of the Austin area. Before the 1909 re-numbering of Chicago's street addresses, all addresses west of the Chicago River were designated as "west," but this changed with the establishment of the address numbering system Chicago uses today. Madison Street is designated as the north–south axis and State Street as the east–west axis, but State Street is not included in and geographically very distant from the West Side.

The most commonly referenced borders by officials that are assigned to the West Side are North Avenue to the north and 31st Street to the south. The western border is where the edge of the city meets the western suburbs of Oak Park and Cicero. These two suburbs border the communities of Austin, Lawndale, and Little Village. The eastern border is often the most disputed border by residents, real estate brokers, and city officials. While some will claim Western Avenue is the eastern border, those in the communities east of Western Avenue such as West Town, the Near West Side, and Pilsen have more historical and cultural ties to the West Side and the central, inner city area more so than to the North Side or South Side. In certain texts, the communities within West Town and Pilsen are grouped together as the Near Northwest Side and Near Southwest Side respectively. Therefore, using the Chicago River as an eastern border of the West Side becomes suitable. Regardless of how the boundaries are defined, the West Side is the smallest in area of the three sections of the city, with an area of approximately 34.7 square miles.

=== Community areas and neighborhoods ===
The community areas of Chicago.

According to the city's official division of its 77 community areas, nine community areas compose the West Side: West Town, the Near West Side, the Lower West Side, Humboldt Park, East Garfield Park, West Garfield Park, North Lawndale, South Lawndale, and Austin. Within these community areas are smaller neighborhoods, some of which match the community area's name and boundaries, and some of which do not use the community area's name at all. The three main community areas that do not match their colloquial neighborhood names are the Lower West Side, which is widely known as Pilsen; North Lawndale, which is simply known as Lawndale; and South Lawndale, which is widely known as Little Village.

Neighborhoods within these community areas include East Ukrainian Village, Ukrainian Village, Noble Square, Pulaski Park, The Patch, and Wicker Park within West Town; Fifth City within East Garfield Park; Heart of Chicago within the Lower West Side; The Island within Austin; University Village, Greektown, Little Italy, and Tri-Taylor within the Near West Side; Homan Square and K-Town within North Lawndale; Marshall Square within South Lawndale; and West Humboldt Park within Humboldt Park.

== Demographics ==
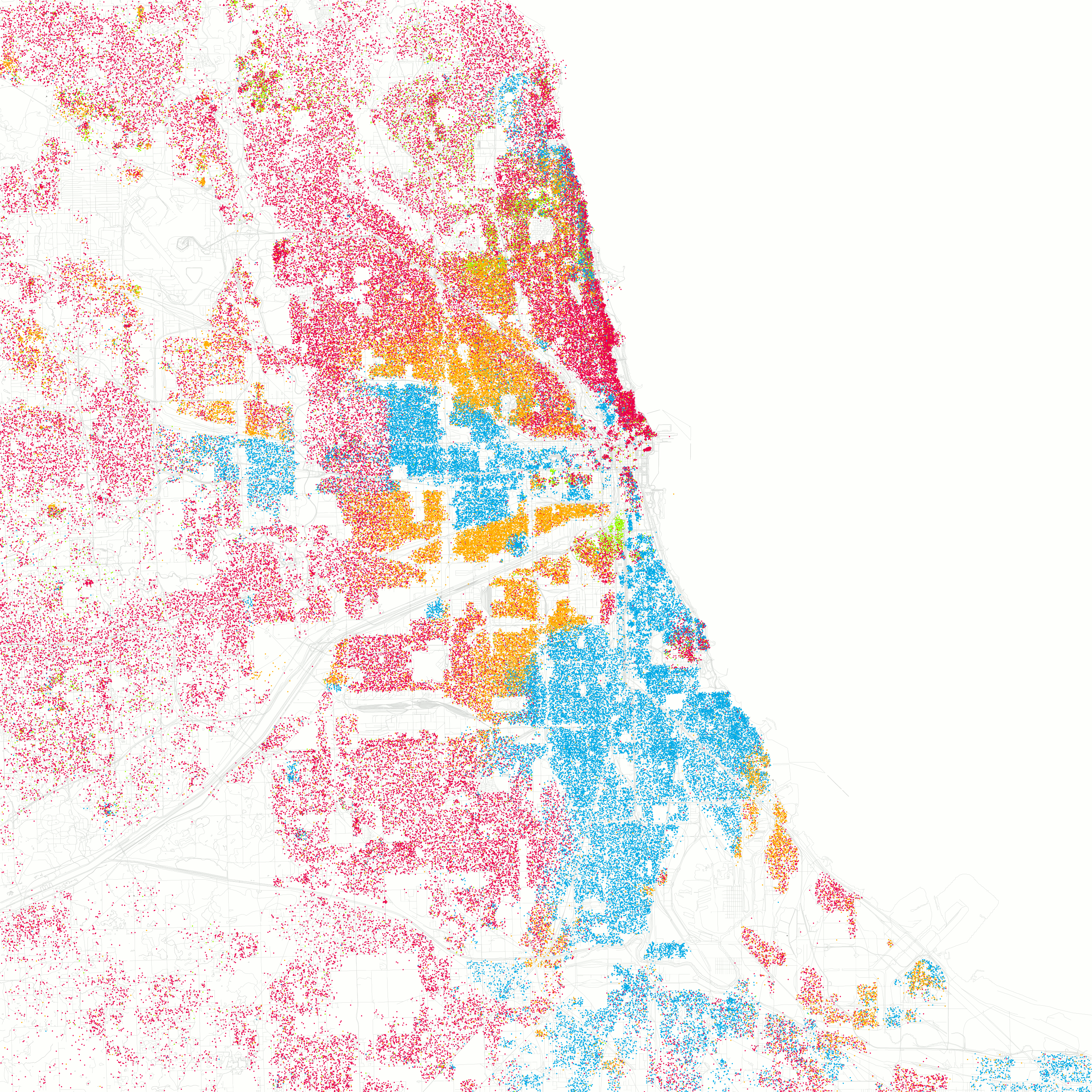
Demographic makeup of Chicago as of 2010 U.S. Census.

A majority of the West Side's Black residents live in the Near West Side, Garfield Park, Austin, Lawndale, and the southern portion of Humboldt Park. As demographic maps from the 2010 U.S. census show, the Black community on the West Side is bordered to the north and to the south by Latino residents. On the north and moving northwest are mostly Puerto Rican and other Latino residents living in the communities of West Town and Humboldt Park, and to the south are primarily Mexican residents living in the communities of Pilsen and Little Village. The gentrifying areas of West Town, the Near West Side, and Pilsen are seeing large influxes of mostly middle-class white residents, thus concentrating the West Side's white population much closer to the downtown area. Other white populations of the West Side include the neighborhood of Galewood in the northern part of the Austin community area as well as the small Polish patches and Eastern European areas remaining in parts of West Town, such as Ukrainian Village.

According to the 2010 U.S. Census, the West Side has a total of 480,687 residents, making it the least populated of the three main sections of the city. However, its population density is very high at 13,852 residents per square mile. In 2010, 44% of residents were non-Hispanic Black, 34% were Latino or Hispanic, and 17% were non-Hispanic white. 3% of residents were of Asian ancestry, mostly residing in the Near West Side in the University Village neighborhood near the University of Illinois at Chicago and the Illinois Medical District. 2% of residents were of Native American descent, multiracial backgrounds, or other origins. Increasing foreclosures and gentrification have driven many of the poorer residents, mostly Black and Latino, toward other parts of the city, particularly the South Side and Northwest Side, as well as lower-income suburbs like Cicero and Berwyn, decreasing the population in certain areas of the West Side.

In 2023, the community areas that make up the west side had a population of 476,628 people. 109,636 or 23.00 percent were White, 159,883 or 33.54 percent were Hispanic or Latino (of Any Race), 173,616 or 36.43 percent were Black, 20,362 or 4.27 percent were Asian, and 13,131 or 2.75 percent identified as other.

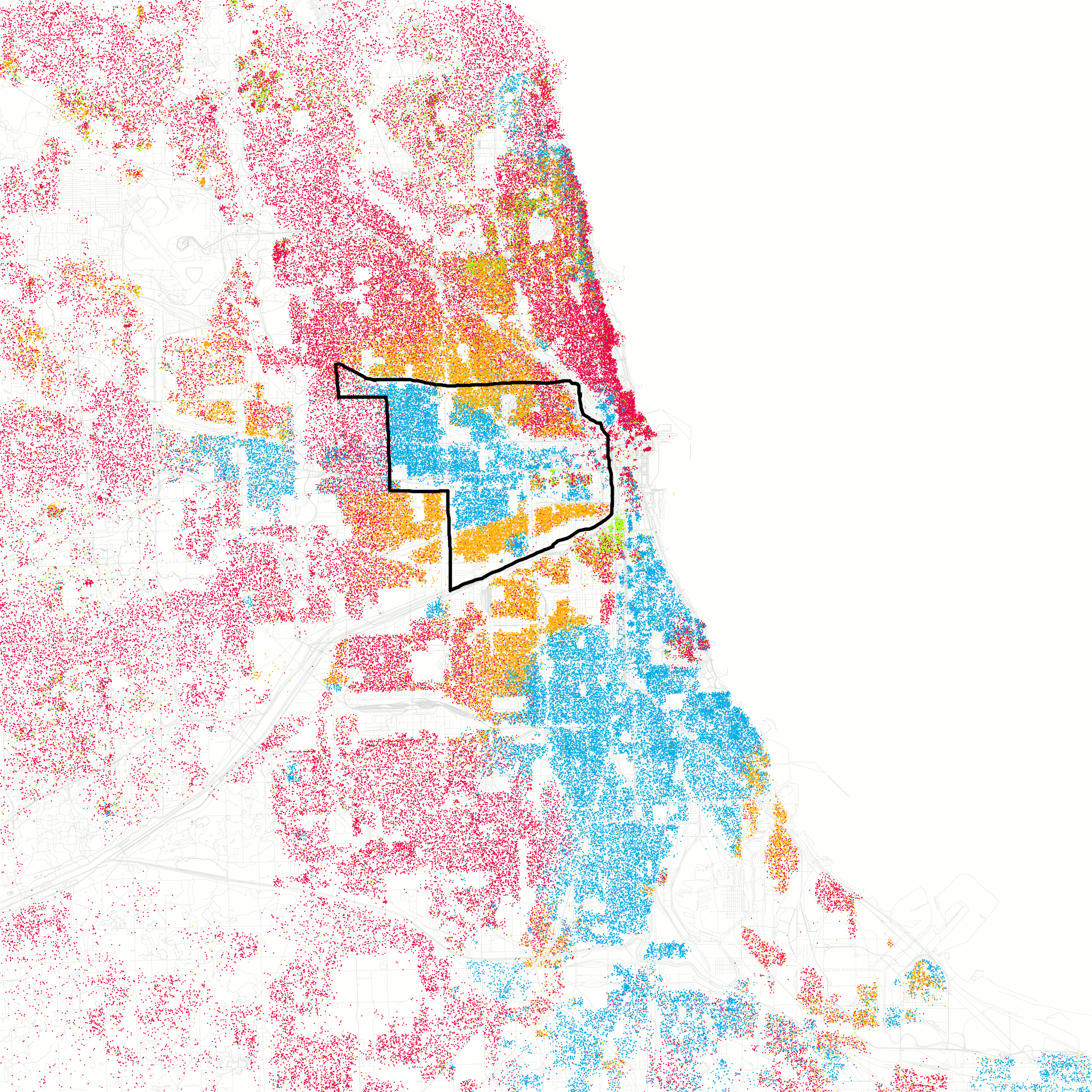
Same demographic map as above, but with the West Side outlined in black.

Population density and income demographics

Community Area	Population Density	Per Capita Income	Households Below Poverty Level
West Town	17,972/sq. mile	$39,596	15.7%
Near West Side	09,653/sq. mile	$41,488	21.6%
Lower West Side	12,227/sq. mile	$15,467	27.2%
Humboldt Park	15,626/sq. mile	$13,391	32.6%
East Garfield Park	10,636/sq. mile	$13,596	39.7%
West Garfield Park	13,910/sq. mile	$10,951	40.3%
North Lawndale	11,187/sq. mile	$12,548	38.6%
South Lawndale	17,269/sq. mile	$10,697	28.1%
Austin	13,783/sq. mile	$15,920	27.0%
Chicago	11,844/sq. mile	$27,148	18.7%

== History ==
Previously, the area was home to indigenous populations including the Cahokian, Potawatomi, Sauk, and Miami. Through legal trickery, the Treaty of Chicago, U.S. government officials were able to obtain land around Lake Michigan.

=== 1830s to late 19th century ===
When Chicago was incorporated as a city in 1834, settlers only lived as far west as Jefferson Street or Halsted Street, less than a half mile west of the Chicago River. Land plotters and wealthier newcomers were more interested in developing land north and south of the original settlement because this land was adjacent to Lake Michigan. As the central business district grew, retail stores set up shop along Lake Street, connecting the central business district with the slower-developing western part of the city. As Lake Street became a bustling thoroughfare throughout the 1840s and 1850s, wealthier residents decided to establish an affluent community on the West Side that could be a retreat from the bustling city center. This was the impetus for the creation of Union Park. As the 1860s came, less affluent residents replaced the wealthier families around Union Park and increased immigration from Europe transformed the Near West Side into an ethnically diverse area. Chicago's first Black community along Kinzie Street and Lake Street became adjacent to an Irish community by the river, as well as German, French, Czech, and Bohemian communities. Polish immigrants settled further north along the river in West Town to work at factories and on the railroad.

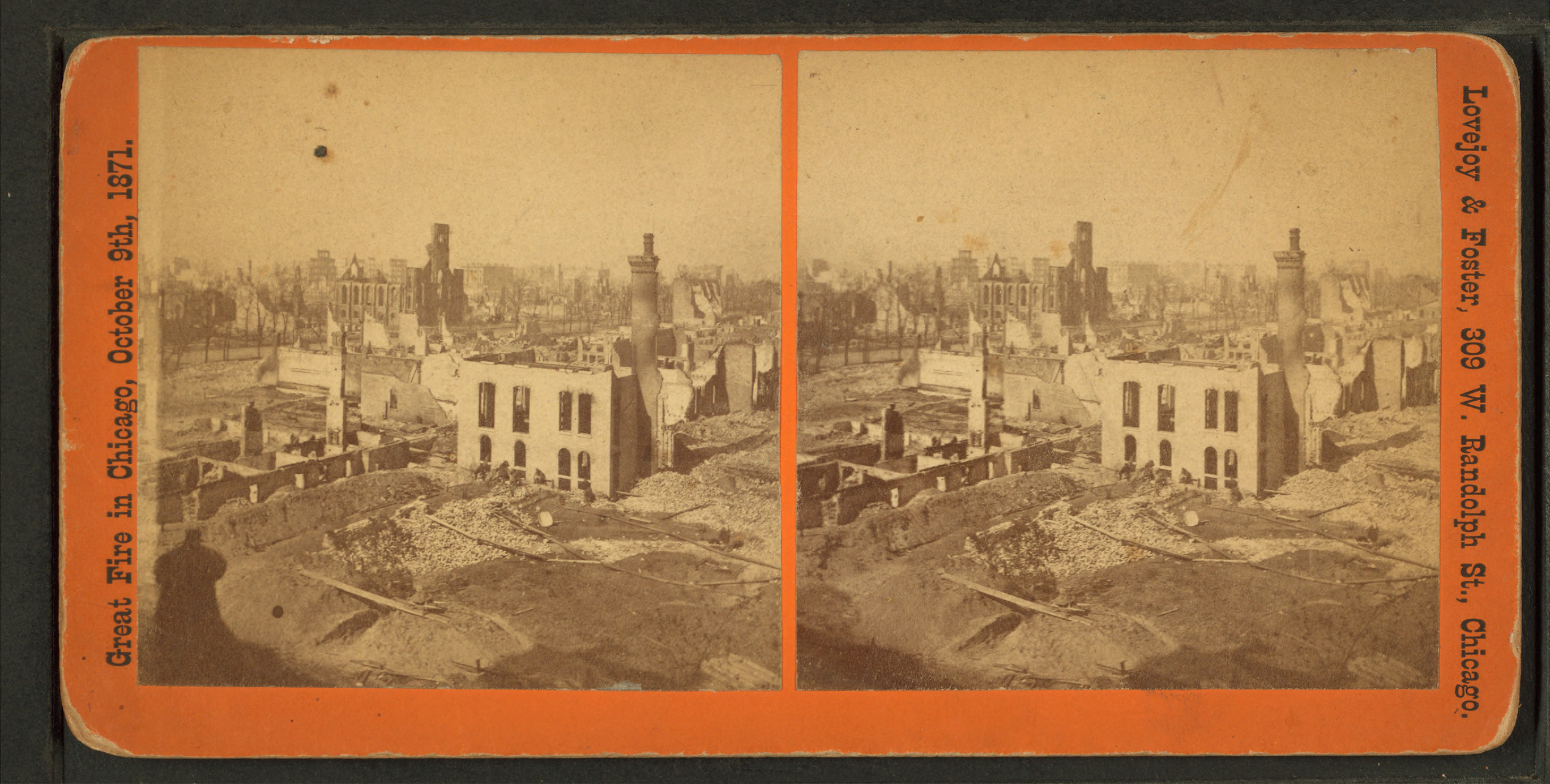
View of Randolph Street after the Great Chicago Fire.

The area was transformed by the Great Chicago Fire in 1871, which made 300,000 residents of the city homeless. The resulting migration toward other parts of the city created very densely populated and overcrowded areas on the Near West Side. Most of the Czech and Bohemian residents moved south establishing the neighborhood of Pilsen, named after the city of Plzeň in the Czech Republic. The fire also began migration into the Lawndale neighborhood, which had advertised itself as a residential suburb with fireproof apartment buildings.

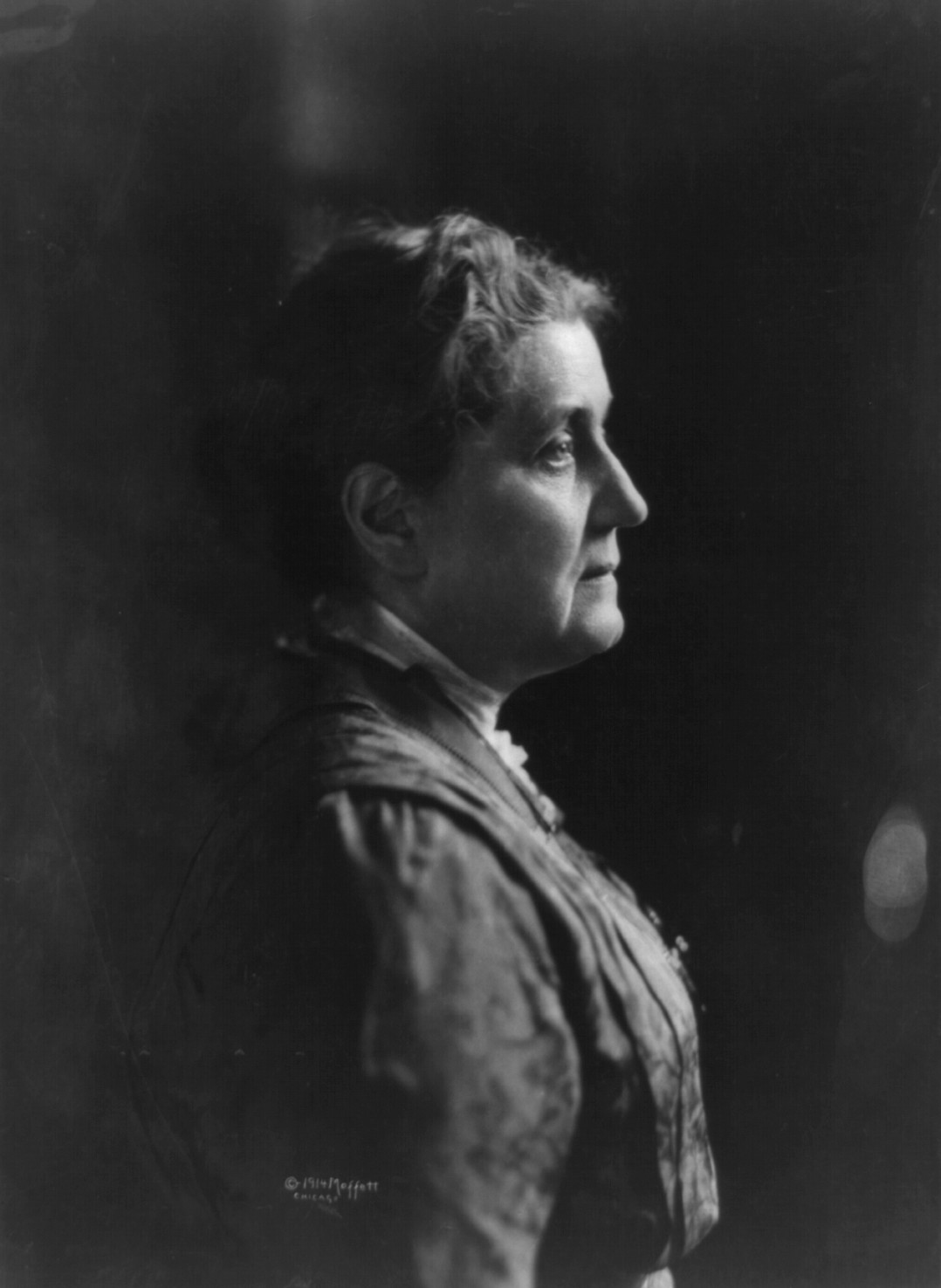
Jane Addams, one of the founders of the nationally acclaimed Hull House Settlement.

Immigration from Europe continued in the area at a rapid rate, and the older Irish and German community became eclipsed by newer Jewish immigrants from Russia and Poland. Large numbers of Italian and Greek immigrants began arriving in the area too. The Jewish immigrants settled between 12th Street, now Roosevelt Road, and 16th Street, centering the community and businesses along Maxwell Street. The Maxwell Street Market continued from this time through the 20th century as an important economic and cultural center for the city. Italian immigrants settled along Polk Street and Taylor Street, establishing Chicago's main Little Italy. Greek immigrants centered their settlement at Harrison Street, Halsted Street, and Blue Island Avenue, calling their community "The Delta." As immigration continued, the area became unhealthily overcrowded, resulting in dilapidated tenements and pollution. These poorer residents also lacked health services from the city. This situation was to be addressed by the creation of the Hull House settlement by Jane Addams and Ellen Gates Starr in 1889. Hull House was a settlement house that provided a range of services to the residents of the West Side. A playground, a gymnasium, and language classes were provided for children, and services were provided for employment, garbage removal, and art programs. Hull House became a center of the Italian and Greek communities, however Black residents of the Near West Side weren't as welcome to use the services of Hull House and had to rely on finding or creating other community services.

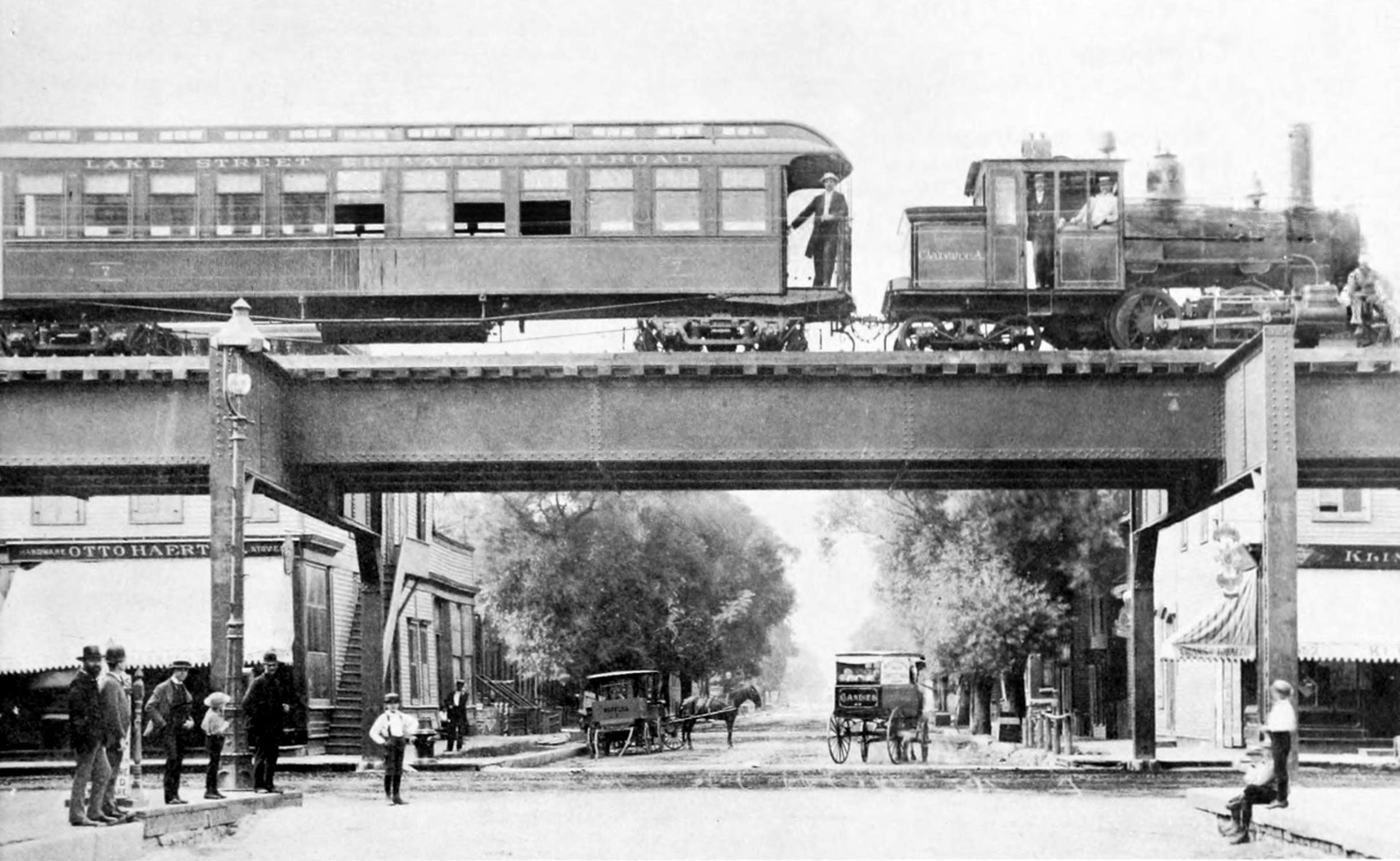
The Lake Street Elevated Railroad in its founding year, 1893.

=== Early to mid-20th century ===
As the 20th century began, Chicago had already annexed land west of Western Avenue, greatly increasing the West Side. East Garfield Park, West Garfield Park, and Humboldt Park had been sparsely populated throughout the late 19th century, but the addition of transportation infrastructure increased the population quickly. In 1892, the first elevated train line was constructed on the South Side and a year later, the Lake Street Elevated Railroad opened, providing transportation service from the city center to the West Side. In 1895, the Metropolitan West Side Elevated Railroad opened, which provided elevated train service down Harrison Street on its Garfield Park branch and also elevated train service down North Avenue on its Humboldt Park branch. Elements of these elevated train lines are used today for the CTA Green Line and Blue Line. Industry began to dominate this area further west. Sears, Roebuck and Company was founded in 1893, and in 1906 built its merchandise and catalog center in Lawndale near the intersection of Homan Avenue and Arthington Street. The North Western Railway had thousands of their employees establish a community in West Garfield Park. At this point, the West Side had immigrant industrial employees from all over Europe. There was a Polish majority in West Town; the Danish, Norwegians, and Russian Jews populated Humboldt Park, and Italians were in East Garfield Park. However, a dramatic change in the city's population occurred with the Great Migration of Blacks from the Southern United States into the urban North.

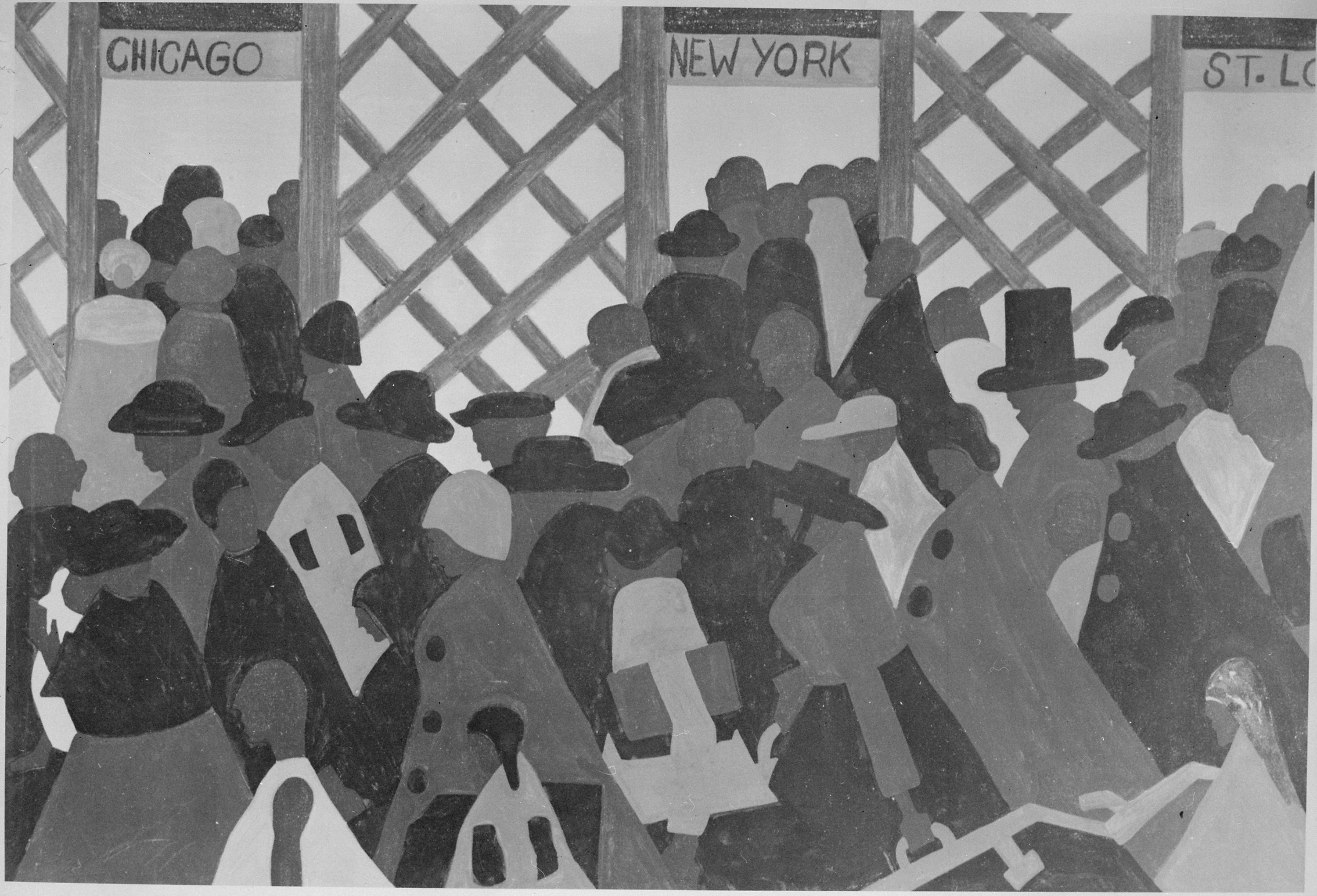
Jacob Lawrence's artwork depicting Great Migration to cities like Chicago.

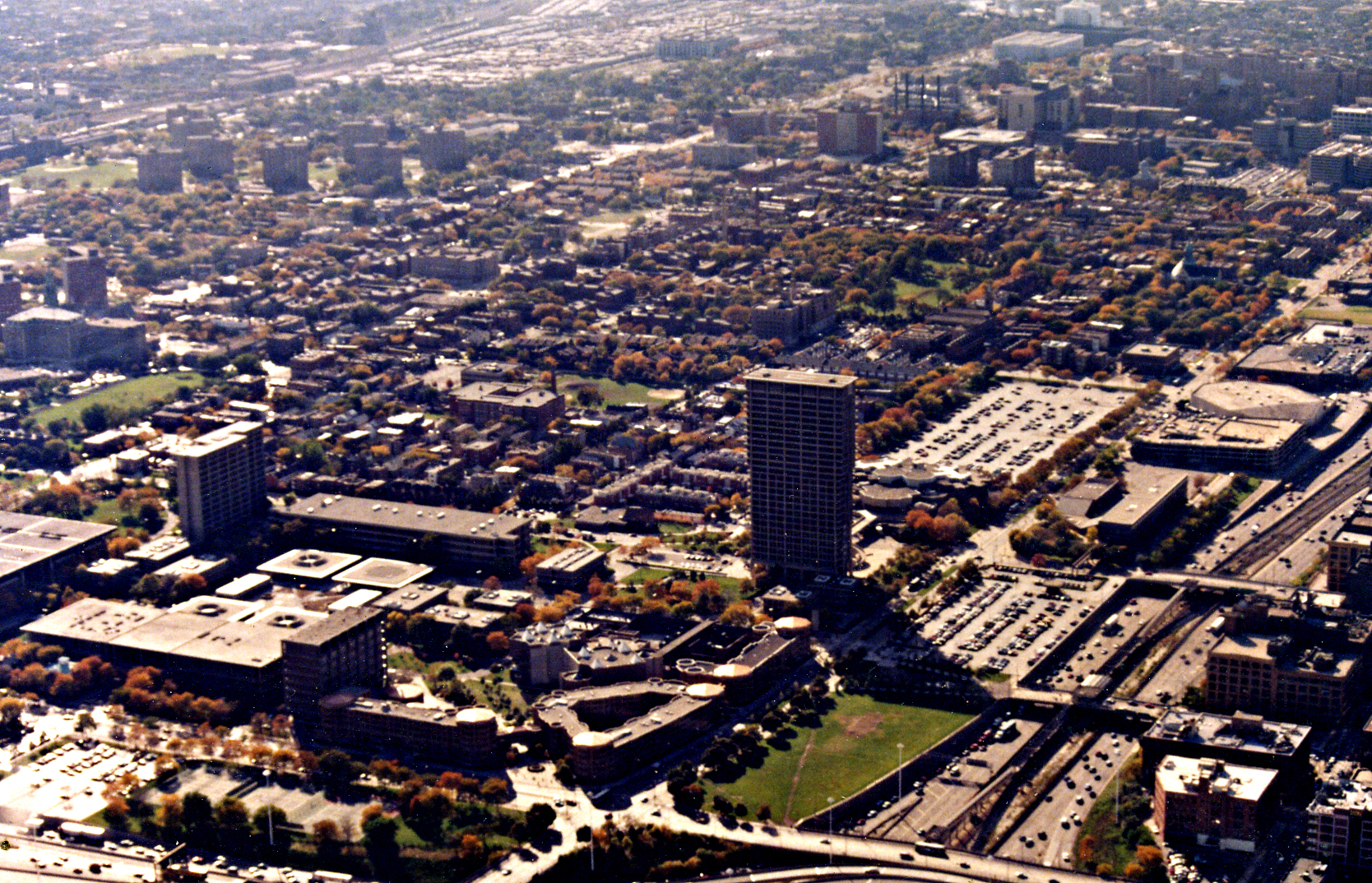
The UIC campus destroyed much of the Near West Side when constructed.

In 1910, Chicago's Black population was at 40,000, most of these people being concentrated on the South Side in an area known as the Black Belt. By 1940, the Black population rose to 278,000, and more of these residents increasingly lived on the West Side. In the Near West Side, there were 26,000 Blacks by 1940, and this community was joined by a growing Mexican-American community and a smaller Puerto Rican community. The Black population on the West Side was growing due in large part to the crowded conditions of the South Side, however crowding increased quickly on the West Side as well. Black residents began moving in small numbers to East Garfield Park, being met with even more housing discrimination than they faced in the Near West Side. By this time, the Maxwell Street Market employed mostly newer Black residents and the market became an important center for Black Chicago blues musicians coming from the South. The construction of the Eisenhower Expressway in the 1950s demolished many homes in the area, forcing residents to relocate further west. The announcement of a University of Illinois campus in Chicago to be constructed in the Near West Side brought the community head-to-head with Mayor Richard J. Daley, and the construction of the university displaced half of the community, including the Hull House settlement. Nearly the entire Italian and Greek communities relocated to the Northwest Side and suburbs. The Black population moved further west into the Near West Side, Garfield Park and the eastern portion of Lawndale, and the Mexican population, losing much of their housing stock, moved in large numbers south to Pilsen.

=== 1960s to 21st century ===
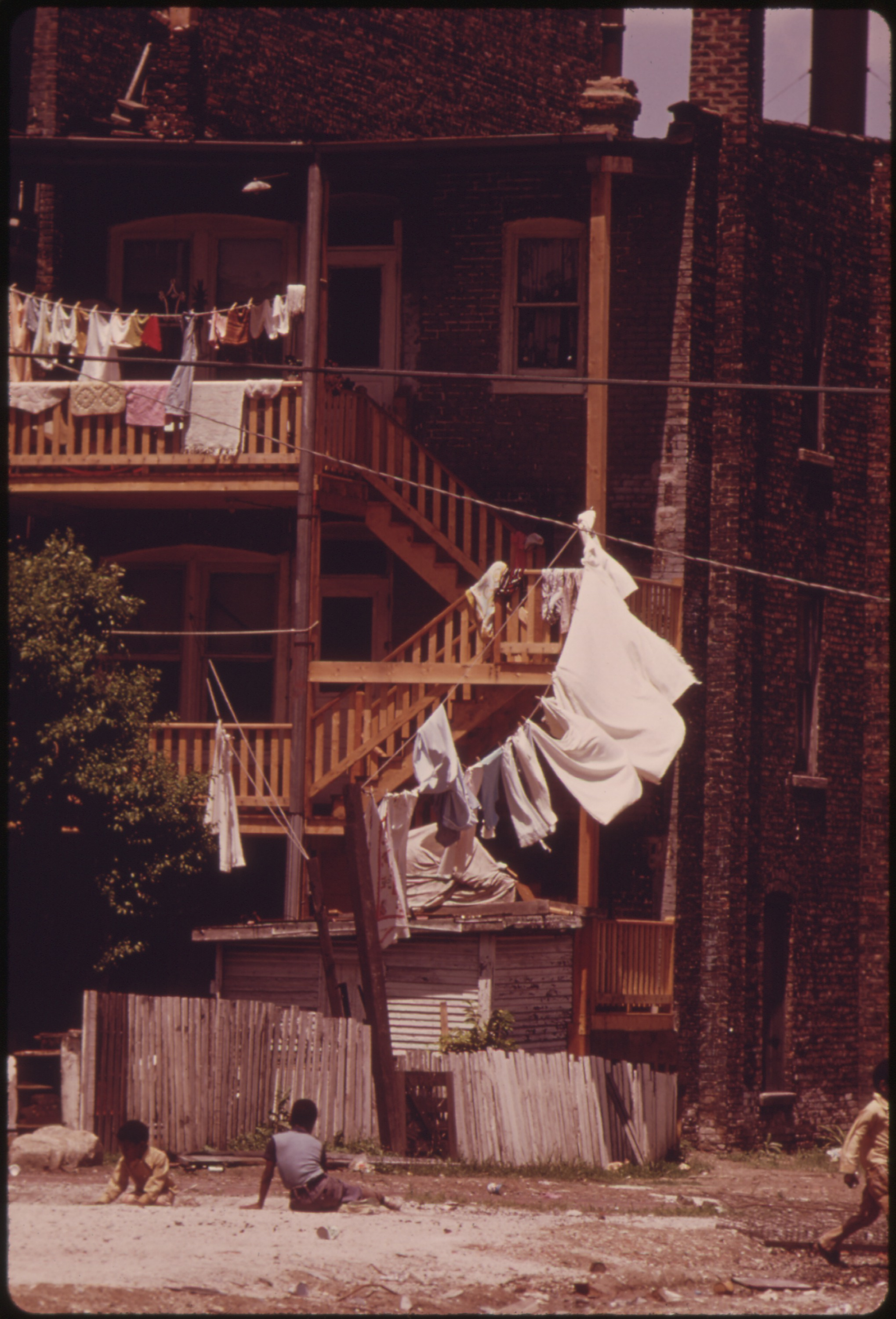
The back porches of a three-flat apartment on West Side, 1973.

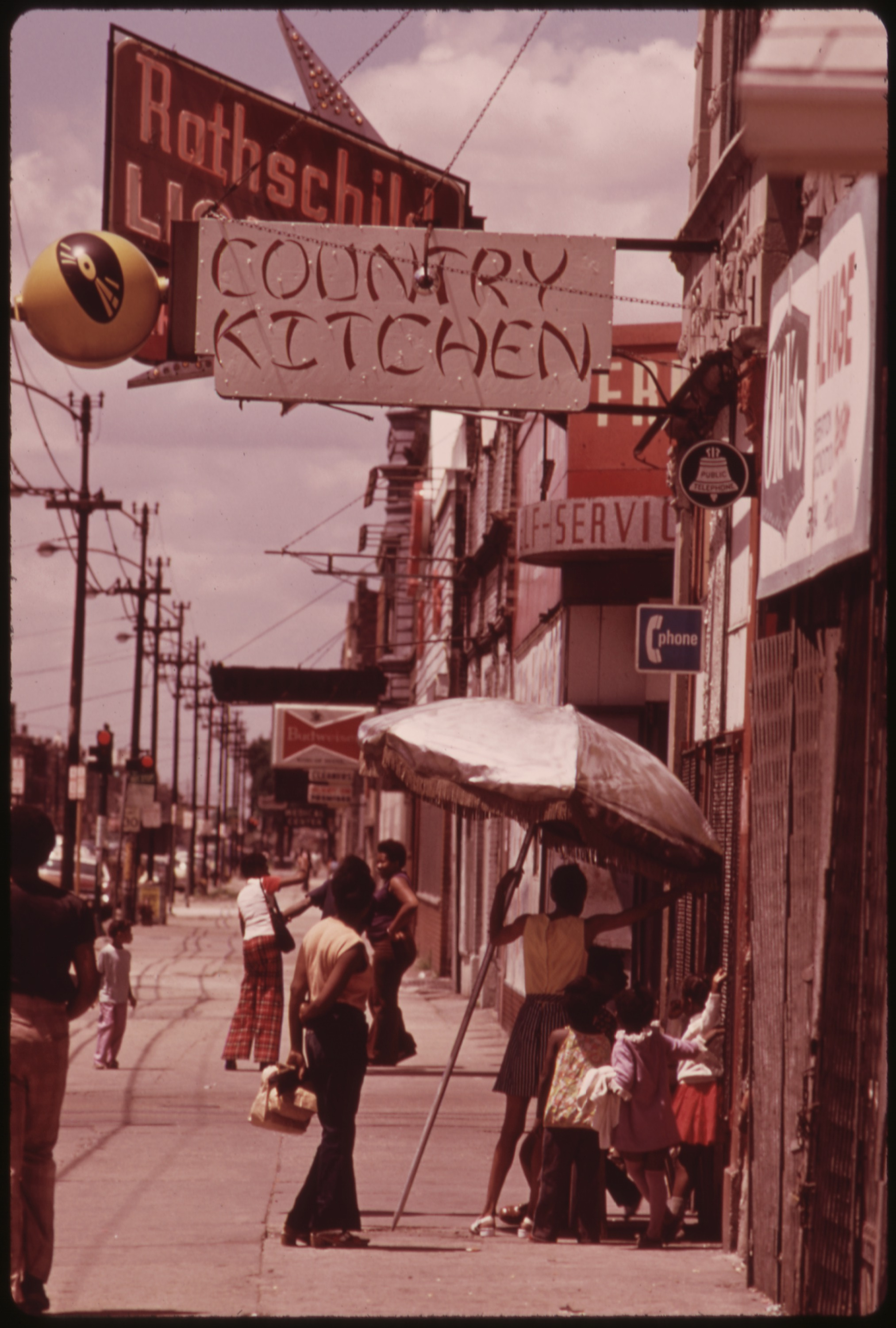
Street scene, West Side, 1973.

White flight and blockbusting drastically changed the demographics of the West Side by the 1950s. Throughout this decade, many white Chicagoans moved to the suburbs in a planned move by investors who, through scare tactics and instigating racial antagonism, encouraged white Chicagoans to sell their city homes and buy homes the investors built in the suburbs. By 1960, Chicago recorded its first ever population drop mainly due to white flight. However, Black and Latino residents began filling the West Side to its maximum. Black areas of the West Side began to experience highly impoverished conditions moving into the 1960s. Many residents moved into housing projects that were built throughout the West Side the previous decade, the main housing projects being ABLA and Henry Horner Homes in the Near West Side, Rockwell Gardens and Harrison Courts in East Garfield Park, and Lawndale Gardens in Lawndale/Little Village. Many of these housing projects became predominantly Black and poor. The Chicago Housing Authority was known for its segregationist policies and lack of building maintenance, and police brutality was very frequent. After the assassination of Martin Luther King Jr. on April 4, 1968, the Blacks of the West Side rebelled in anger against the oppressive system made more apparent by King's murder. Long stretches of businesses along Madison Street in Garfield Park and Austin and along Roosevelt Road in Lawndale, the majority of which were owned by whites, were looted and burned down. Mayor Daley ordered 10,500 police and 6,700 National Guardsmen into the West Side, ordering "to shoot to kill any arsonist or anyone with a Molotov cocktail in his hand... and... to shoot to maim or cripple anyone looting any stores in our city."

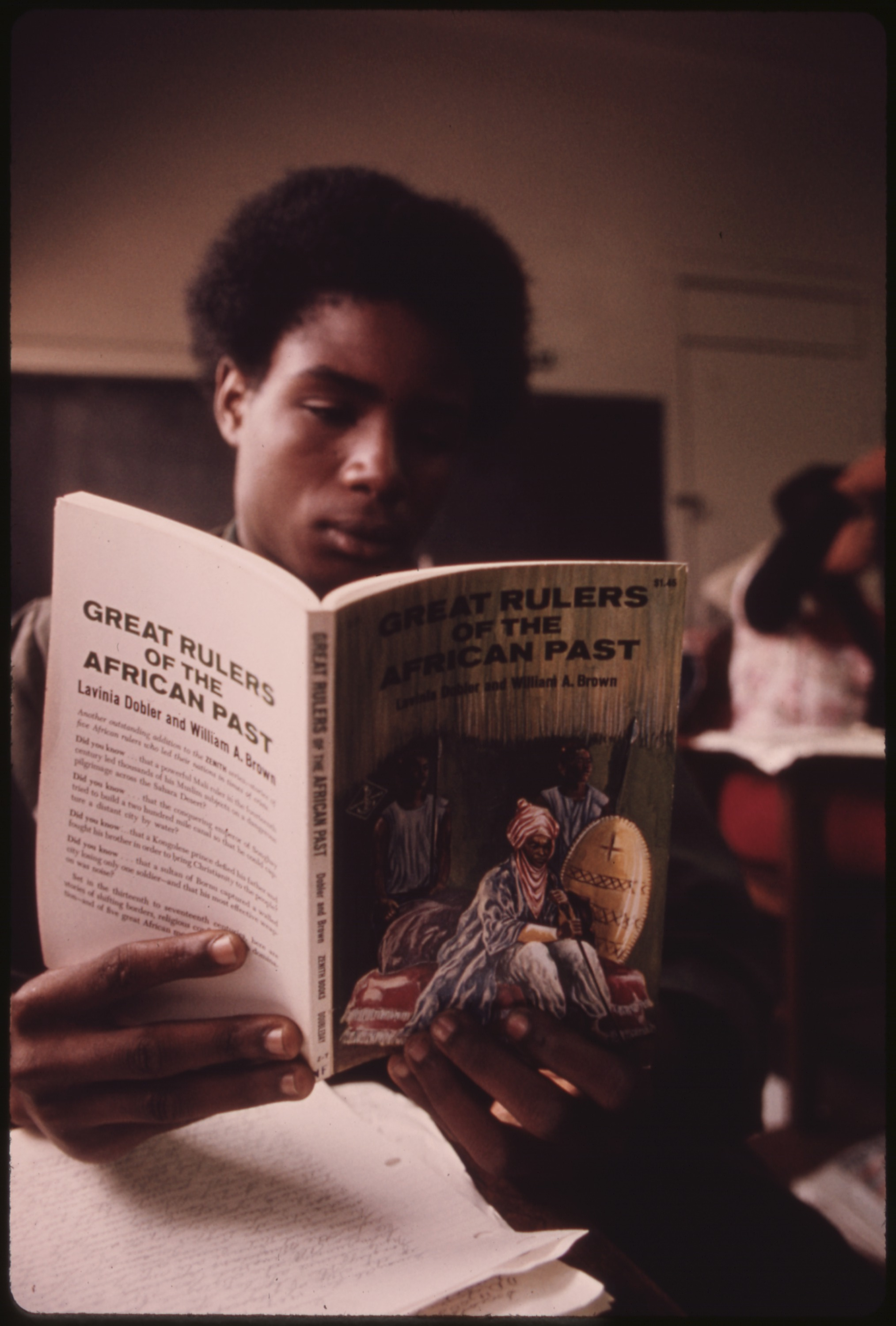
A Chicago Public Schools student on the West Side in 1973 reading a book on rulers throughout African history.

During the late 1960s, the Illinois chapter of the Black Panther Party had its headquarters on the West Side on Madison Street near Western Avenue. The chapter chairman, Fred Hampton, helped his chapter establish a free breakfast program for children as well as free health clinics for the community. Hampton was murdered in his sleep in a planned raid by Chicago police and the FBI on the party's West Side apartment on Monroe Street in December 1969. Over 5,000 people attended Hampton's funeral. The drug epidemic began sweeping through the West Side in the 1970s, and crime continued to climb. Unlike the South Side, there weren't large middle, upper-middle, or affluent Black communities that developed on the West Side. They existed by block or in small pockets, mostly in the Austin neighborhood closer to the suburb of Oak Park. Black representation of the West Side in Congress began in the 1970s with the placement of George W. Collins in the seat of Daniel J. Ronan who died in 1969. After George W. Collins was killed in a plane crash at Midway Airport in 1972, his wife Cardiss Collins was elected to Congress, making her the first Black female representative from the Midwest.

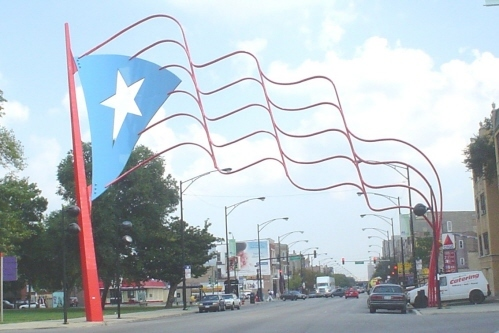
Steel Puerto Rican flag at Division Street/Paseo Boricua and California Avenue in Humboldt Park.

Puerto Ricans displaced by gentrification and city-backed urban renewal projects in Lincoln Park began moving to West Town and Humboldt Park by the thousands during the mid-late 1960s. In 1960, West Town had a Latino population of 1%. By 1970, that number had grown to 39%. Polish residents, who remained less upwardly mobile than the West Side's former German and Russian Jewish immigrants, remained in relatively large numbers in West Town centered around Catholic parishes. Humboldt Park began to see larger influxes of Puerto Ricans as the 1960s ended. In 1966, the first major urban Puerto Rican rebellion in the U.S. happened on Division Street, an event later known as the Division Street Riots.

As the 1970s began, Humboldt Park suffered from poverty, crime, and gangs, leading to another uprising in 1977. To combat this, Puerto Rican community members across the West Side created social service organizations such as the Latin American Defense Organization (LADO) and the Segundo Ruiz Belvis Cultural Center. The Young Lords, a former street turf gang from Lincoln Park, turned into a human liberation group, becoming warriors for the community by fighting further displacement and holding sit-ins at the Wicker Park Welfare Office and takeovers of institutions to implement free breakfast programs similar to the Black Panther Party. In Pilsen, Mexican-Americans and Chicanos reclaimed the area as La Diesiocho because of the 18th Street business corridor. Pilsen became a large center for mural painting by those part of the Chicano movement and for those attempting to shift the view of Pilsen as a dangerous community. La Villita, the neighborhood to the west of Pilsen and Heart of Chicago was being populated by even more Mexican-Americans, and the business corridor along 26th Street became the busiest after the Loop.

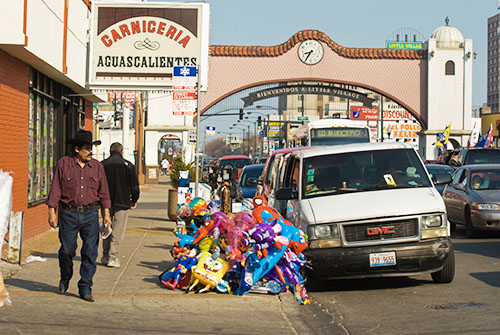
A man walking in La Villita along 26th Street near Kedzie Avenue.

During the 1980s and 1990s, the communities of the West Side continued to struggle, but hopes were being held together by social organizations, movements, and programs. The election of Mayor Harold Washington in 1983 gave hope to the West Side, especially since his election opened the door for more political representation, but his sudden death in 1987 was viewed as a serious blow to Chicago's entire Black community. Six years later, Washington's unofficial floor leader in the city council, Puerto Rican Chicagoan Luis Gutiérrez, was elected to the U.S. Congress as the Midwest's first Latino representative in Congress.

Chicago's homicides reached peak numbers in the early 1990s in Humboldt Park, Austin, Lawndale, and Garfield Park. As numbers began to go down throughout the 1990s, another round of displacement began to take hold. Major gentrification efforts in the Near West Side and West Town began, where corporate investors supported the addition of high-end businesses and luxury-style residential condos. Property taxes rose thus raising rents, forcing poorer Puerto Rican and Black residents to move yet again.

As the 2000s began, Pilsen began to see more major gentrification efforts. However, the community put up a substantial fight against this displacement process and gentrification progressed more slowly. During this time, the ABLA homes were demolished along with the Henry Horner Homes and Rockwell Gardens. Some of these areas have been replaced with new housing developments with the intended purpose of creating mixed-income communities. However, these areas are now mainly populated by younger, white, middle-class to upper-middle class professionals whom have been displacing the poorer residents at a rapid rate. In 2014, Redfin named Humboldt Park to be the nation's 10th hottest neighborhood, demonstrating high interest in gentrifying the community.

The new Chicago High School for the Arts has moved from the South Side into the closed Lafayette Elementary building in Humboldt Park near a growing community of gentrifiers. A new Pete's Fresh Market has been opened at Western Avenue and Madison Street, helping a long-time food desert; however, the poorer residents of the neighborhood are being displaced into other neighborhoods that are currently food deserts. In recent years, the West Side has seen a steady population and is affordable and major reinvestment in neighborhoods like Austin.

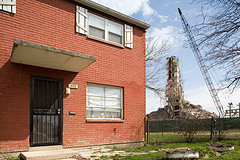
The ABLA homes were completed by 1961 and demolished by 2004.

== Community events ==
The West Side is home to the Puerto Rican Parade and Festival or Fiestas Puertorriqueñas held annually along Division Street and Paseo Boricua in Humboldt Park. The new Chicago Westside Music Festival occurs annually in Garfield Park. Festa Italiana occurs every year in Little Italy, near the location of the Taste of Greektown. In Little Village, the Festival de la Villita takes place along 26th Street celebrating the community as well as a Mexican Independence Day Parade. Another Mexican Independence Day Parade takes place in Pilsen along 18th Street. The Austin Town Hall in South Austin hosts a multitude of events such as plays and concerts.

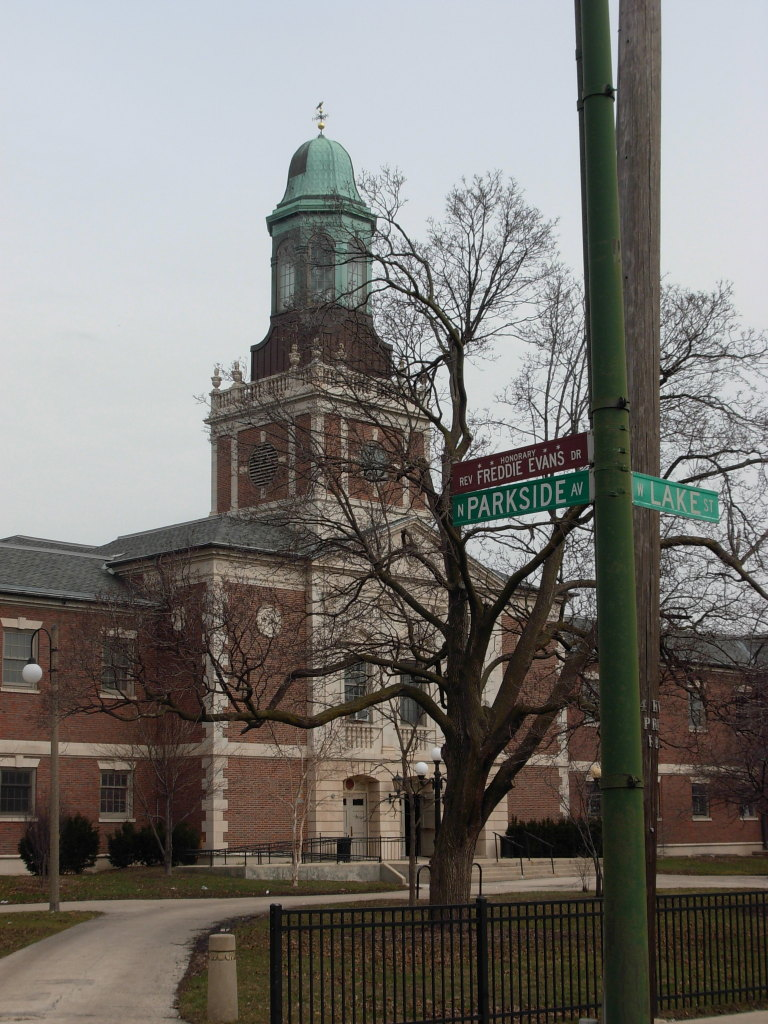
The Austin Town Hall on Lake Street between Parkside Avenue and Central Avenue.

With the advent of gentrification on the West Side, many recent festivals have been created by newer residents such as Wicker Park Fest and the Pitchfork Music Festival in Union Park. More recently, an event called Riot Fest has been held in Humboldt Park since 2012, but has since moved to Douglass Park after controversy among Puerto Rican event organizers who were denied things that Riot Fest had received, such as alcohol permits for the Fiestas Puertorriqueñas. This controversy along with the protests against the festival's location in Humboldt Park have prompted festival coordinators to move Riot Fest to Douglass Park, another West Side park, causing further protest and backlash by longtime Lawndale and Little Village residents.

== Education ==
=== Colleges and universities ===
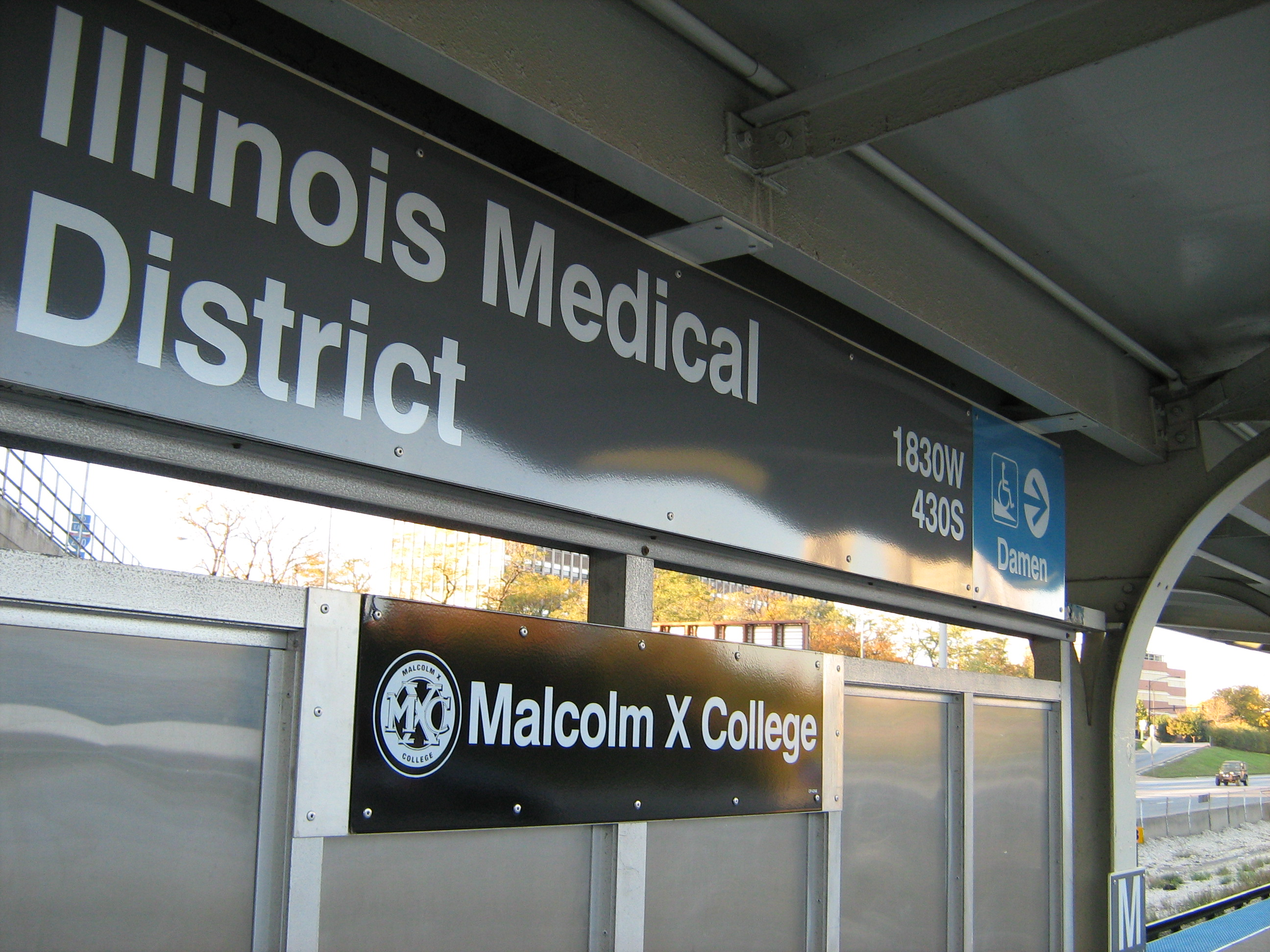
Illinois Medical District Blue Line station near Malcolm X College and Rush University.

There are several institutions of higher education throughout the West Side. The largest and most well-known is the University of Illinois at Chicago, more commonly referred to as UIC. The school was originally called Circle Campus in reference to its proximity to the Circle Interchange, now named the Jane Byrne Interchange. The school has an enrollment of nearly 30,000 students, and has its own athletics program, the UIC Flames. UIC also operates the University of Illinois College of Medicine, a major component of the Illinois Medical District. Rush University, also located in the medical district, operates Rush University Medical Center and the Johnston R. Bowman Health Center.

The City Colleges of Chicago operates two colleges on the West Side. In the Near West Side, there is the long-established Malcolm X College. Located on Van Buren Street near Damen Avenue, Malcolm X College is linked to Chicago's first city college Crane Junior College, later Herzl College, which was originally located in Lawndale near Douglass Park. In 1968, the West Side community urged the city to rename the college after Malcolm X, who was assassinated three years earlier. The request was granted, and the school was moved from Lawndale to its present location. In January 2016, Malcolm X College is planning on completing a new, larger facility across the street on Jackson Boulevard with a new health science center and auditorium. The other city college located on the West Side is the Arturo Velasquez West Side Technical Institute, a satellite campus of Richard J. Daley College located near Little Village.

St. Augustine College, the first bilingual institution of higher learning in Illinois, has a campus near Little Village, and another campus immediately north of Humboldt Park, serving Chicago's Spanish-speaking community.

=== Primary and secondary schools ===
Chicago Public Schools operates the public schools on the West Side, including many elementary schools. The West Side was heavily affected by Mayor Rahm Emanuel's school closures of 2013.

High schools in the area include Crane High School, Clemente High School, Orr High School, Marshall High School, Juarez High School, Manley High School, Wells High School, Farragut Career Academy, and the Little Village Lawndale High School Campus.

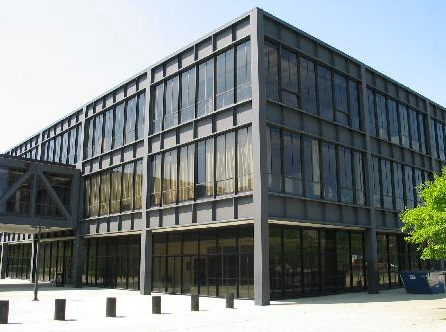
Whitney M. Young Magnet High School, one of the highest-performing high schools in the city and nation.

Two selective enrollment high schools are located on the West Side: George Westinghouse College Prep and Whitney M. Young College Prep. Students from all over the city can apply to these schools and admission is based on grades, attendance, and exam scores.

There are many charter schools throughout this section of the city. The Noble Network of Charter Schools operates numerous campuses throughout the West Side, and its original location, Noble Street College Prep, is located in West Town.

The Chicago High School for the Arts has moved from its former location on the South Side in Bronzeville to its new location in the recently closed Lafayette Elementary school near Augusta Boulevard and California Avenue. The new location provides another high school option for residents of the area, including those whose homes are zoned to high schools such as Wells High School and Clemente High School.

Dr. Pedro Albizu Campos Puerto Rican High School located in Humboldt Park is an alternative school created in the 1970s to remedy the high drop-out rate of Puerto Rican youth in Chicago. The school uses a critical pedagogy to engage students in restoring and empowering their community by teaching students the history of figures such as Pedro Albizu Campos and Oscar López Rivera.

The Roman Catholic Archdiocese of Chicago operates area Catholic schools, most notably St. Ignatius College Prep.

== Political representatives ==
The West Side, due to its large population and high density, has many political representatives at the city, state, and national level.

Representatives in U.S. Congress

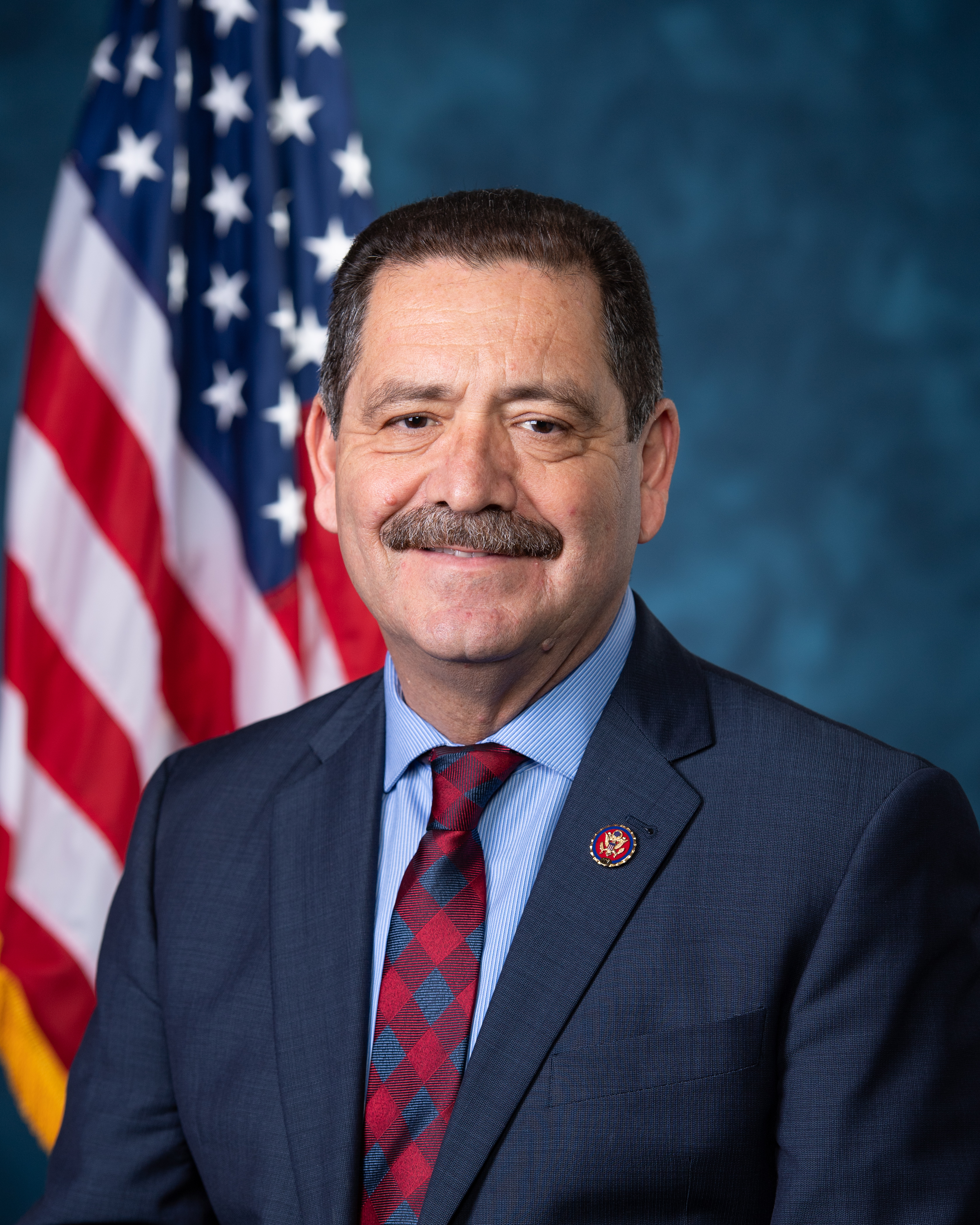
Representative Chuy García, 4th district (including Humboldt Park, Pilsen, and Little Village).

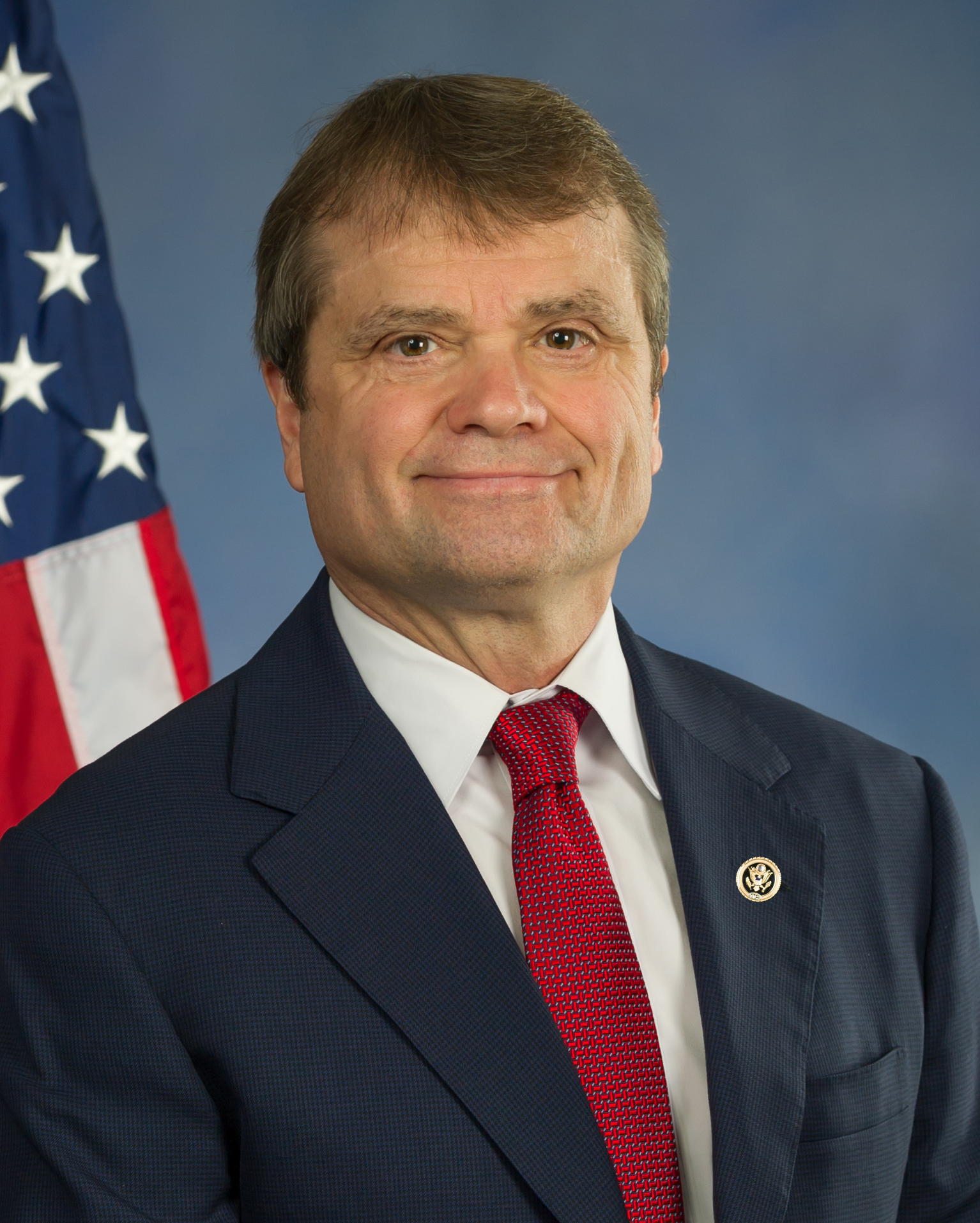
Representative Mike Quigley, 5th district (including West Town).

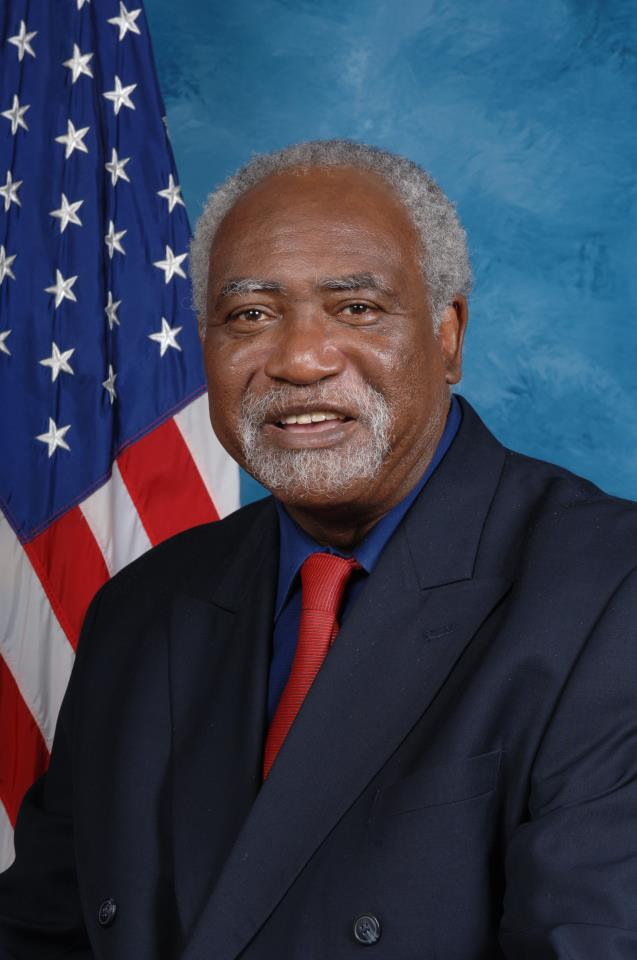
Representative Danny K. Davis, 7th district (including Near West Side, Garfield Park, Lawndale, Austin, Humboldt Park, and Cook County Jail).

Representatives in the Illinois State Senate

Name	District
Antonio Muñoz	1st
William Delgado	2nd
Kimberly A. Lightford	4th
Patricia Van Pelt	5th
Martin A. Sandoval	11th
Don Harmon	39th

Representatives in the Illinois House of Representatives

Name	District
Edward J. Acevedo	2nd
Cynthia Soto	4th
La Shawn K. Ford	8th
Derrick Smith	10th
Silvana Tabares	21st
Camille Y. Lilly	78th

The following wards are representative of the West Side in the Chicago City Council: 1, 2, 12, 22, 24, 25, 26, 27, 28, 29, 30, 32, 37.

== Transportation ==
Due to its proximity to the downtown area, the West Side has extensive mass transit as well as highways and roads. The main highway running through the area is the Eisenhower Expressway, the name for Interstate 290 within Chicago. The Stevenson Expressway runs just south of Pilsen and Little Village giving residents access to the Southwest Side and Midway Airport.

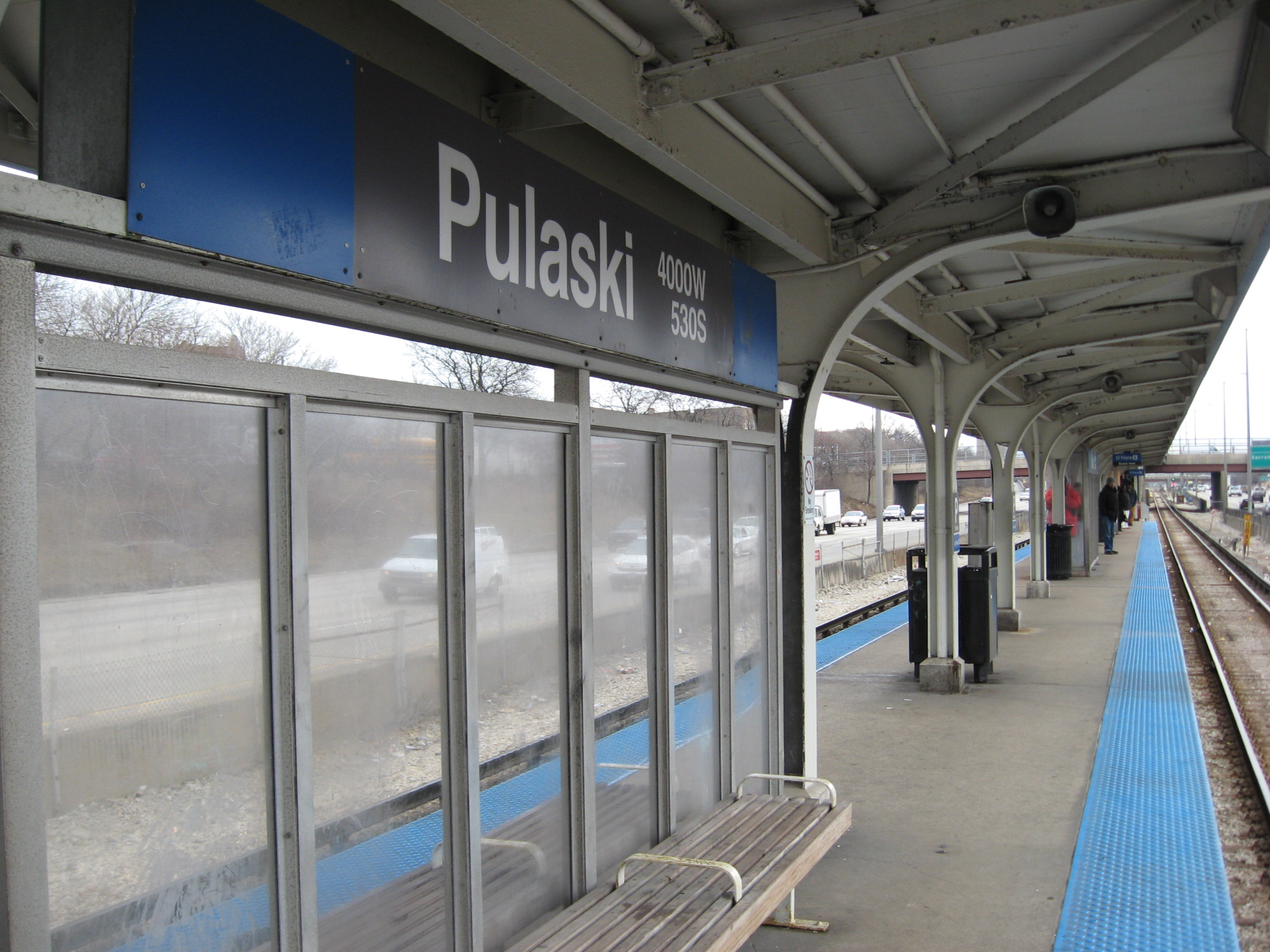
The Pulaski Blue Line station in West Garfield Park on the median of the Eisenhower Expressway.

The West Side is linked to the rest of the city by several Chicago Transit Authority (CTA) bus and train lines, as well as Metra train lines. The West Side is served by the Blue, Green and Pink lines and the BNSF and the Union Pacific West Line Metra lines. Union Station, the main railroad terminal of both Metra and Amtrak trains is located just west of the Chicago River and downtown. To the north of Union Station is the smaller Ogilvie Transportation Center that serves three Metra lines.

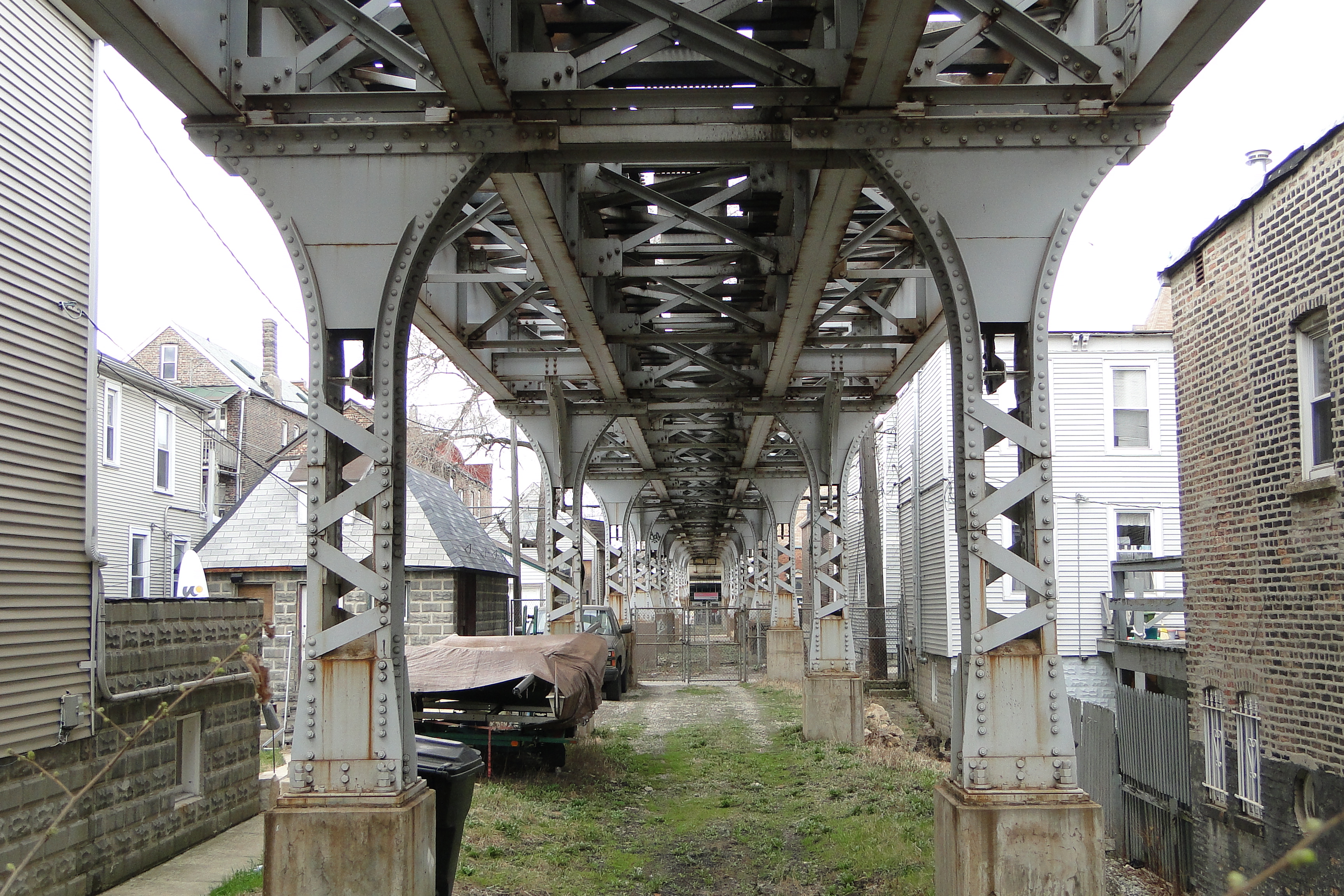
Under the Pink Line tracks in the Pilsen neighborhood.

Major thoroughfares on the West Side include Grand Avenue, North Avenue, Division Street, Chicago Avenue, Madison Street, Jackson Boulevard, Roosevelt Road, Blue Island Avenue, 16th Street, 18th Street, Ogden Avenue, Cermak Road, and 26th Street. Major roads that run north–south that go to other parts of the city include Halsted Street, Racine Avenue, Ashland Avenue, Damen Avenue, Western Avenue, California Avenue, Kedzie Avenue, Homan Avenue, Central Park Avenue, Pulaski Road, Cicero Avenue, Laramie Avenue, Central Avenue, and Austin Boulevard.

== Museums and cultural institutions ==
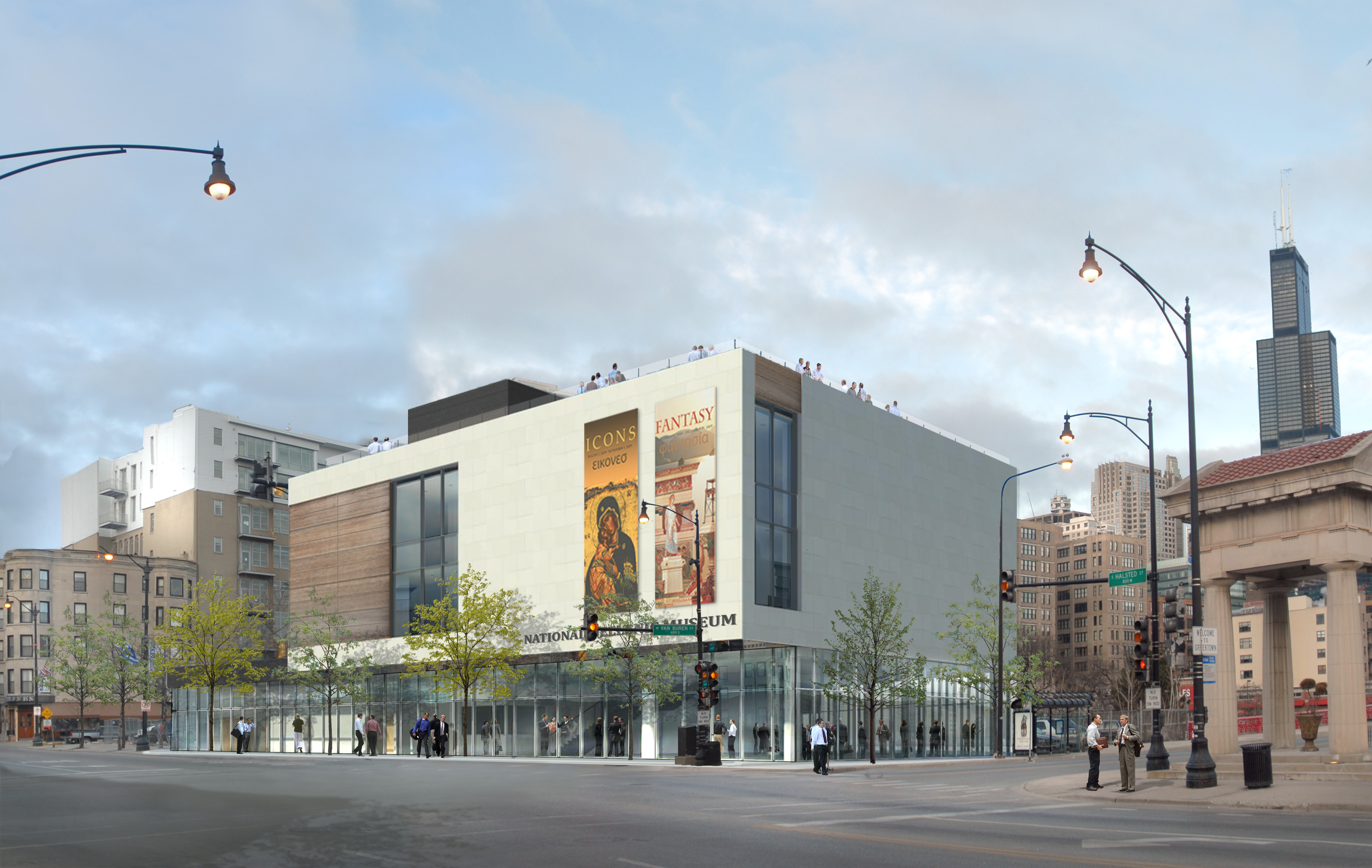
The National Hellenic Museum in Greektown.

There is a wide range of museums and cultural institutions on the West Side. In West Town, there are many institutions representing the large Polish community in Chicago as well as other Eastern European ethnic groups. The Polish Museum of America, the Ukrainian National Museum, and the Ukrainian Institute of Modern Art are all located in West Town.

The newly reconstructed National Hellenic Museum, the nation's second oldest Greek-American cultural museum, is located in Greektown. Not too far south of the museum is the Hull House Museum and National Italian American Sports Hall of Fame.

In Pilsen, the National Museum of Mexican Art is a nationally recognized museum that offers free admission daily and showcases Mexican art across time and provides professional development to Mexican artists. Further west in Little Village is the Mexican Museum of Culture.

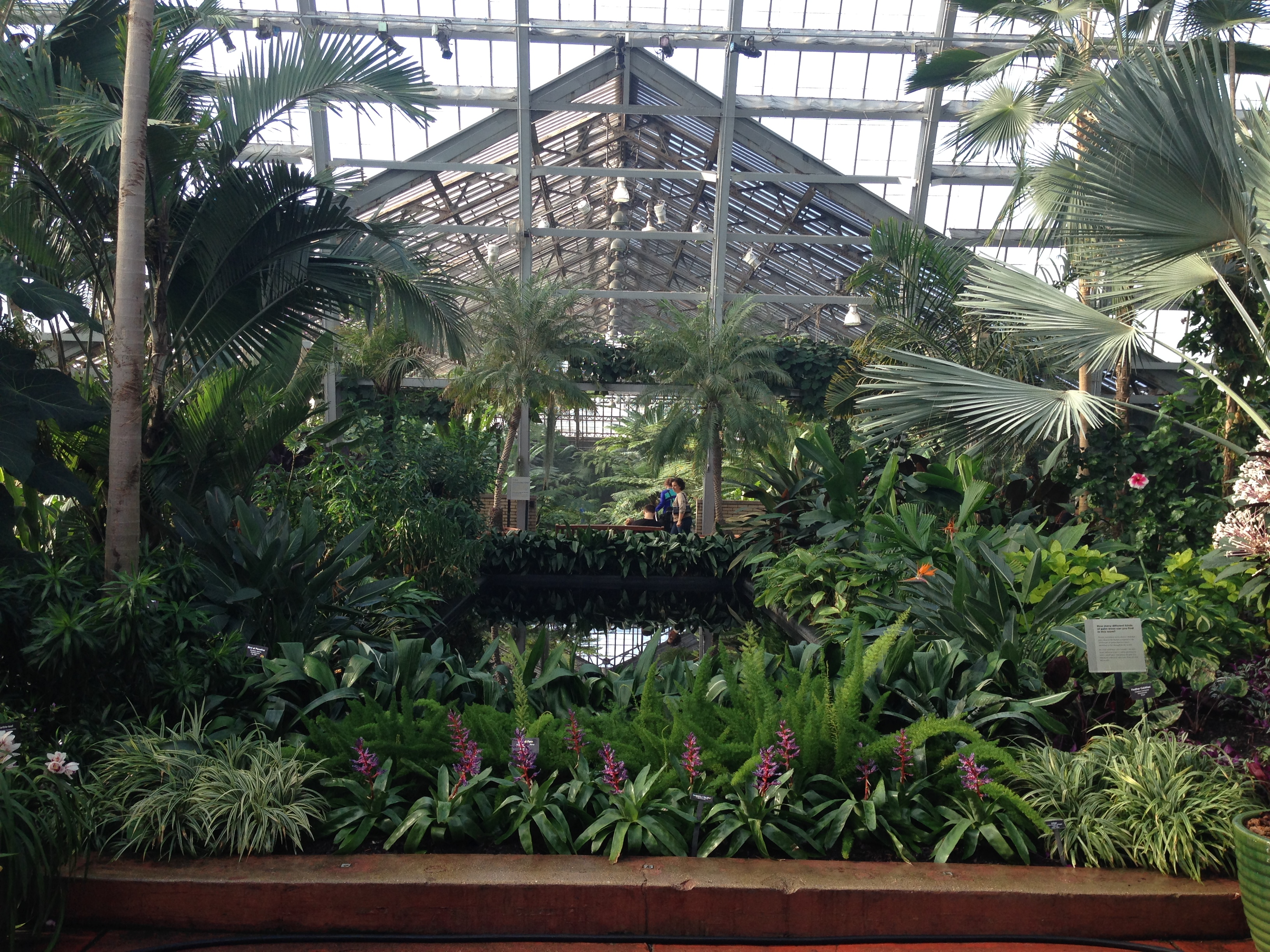
Inside the Garfield Park Conservatory.

Located within Garfield Park is the Garfield Park Conservatory, one of the largest in the nation. In the Austin neighborhood is the Sankofa Cultural Arts Center, a center for education, art, and workshops on Pan-African cultures.

The Institute of Puerto Rican Arts and Culture and the Puerto Rican Cultural Center in Humboldt Park have exhibits and arts workshops that educate the community about the Puerto Rican experience in Chicago and the United States.

The Chicago Tool Library is headquartered in the area.

== Sports ==
The West Side is home to the United Center sports arena, located near Madison Street and Damen Avenue. The United Center is home for both the Chicago Bulls of the NBA and the Chicago Blackhawks of the NHL.

== Notable people ==
The following are notable people from or associated with the West Side:

- Jane Addams, settlement social worker
- Mark Aguirre, basketball player
- L. Frank Baum, author of The Wonderful Wizard of Oz
- Saul Bellow, writer
- John Belushi, comedian
- Danny Boy, hip-hop artist
- Sufe Bradshaw, actress
- Frances Xavier Cabrini, first U.S. citizen to be canonized by the Roman Catholic Church
- Anton Cermak, former mayor of Chicago
- Jesús Chávez, boxer
- Sandra Cisneros, writer
- Mark Clark, defense captain of the Peoria chapter of the Illinois Chapter of the Black Panther Party
- Crucial Conflict, rap group
- Da Brat, rapper and actress
- DLOW, hip-hop dancer and rapper
- Stuart Dybek, writer
- Lupe Fiasco, rapper
- Luz Maria Frias, attorney
- Kevin Garnett, basketball player
- Jaslene Gonzalez, model and winner of Cycle 8 of America's Next Top Model
- Benny Goodman, jazz musician
- Fred Hampton, chairman of the Chicago chapter of the Illinois Chapter of the Black Panther Party
- Wood Harris, actor
- Henry Standing Bear, an Oglala Lakota chief
- Howlin' Wolf, blues musician
- George Jackson, Black Panther and prisoners organizer, part of Soledad Brothers
- Jonathan Jackson, revolutionary who attempted to free Soledad Brothers from prison
- Ramsey Lewis, jazz musician
- Oscar López Rivera, Puerto Rican nationalist and political prisoner
- Rudy Lozano, Mexican activist and organizer
- Kel Mitchell, actor
- Pat Sajak, television personality
- Horatio Sanz, actor and comedian
- Ellen Gates Starr, settlement social worker
- Marques Sullivan, football player
- Larenz Tate, actor
- Studs Terkel, historian
- Isiah Thomas, basketball player
- Twista, hip hop artist
- Nadine Velazquez, actress
- Dinah Washington, blues musician
- Robert Townsend, Artist
- Saba (rapper), Rapper
- Lucki, Rapper
- Karimah Westbrook, actress
- Patrick Beverley, NBA basketball player
- William McDonough, Former CEO of the Federal Reserve Bank of New York
