= Chicago Tool Library =

US non-profit organization

- 41.8862887°N 87.7265928°W
- Location: 4015 W Carroll Avenue Chicago, Illinois U.S.
- Type: 501(c)(3) non-profit organization
- Established: 2019; 7 years ago

Other information
- Public transit access: Green at Pulaski
- Website: chicagotoollibrary.org

The Chicago Tool Library is a 501(c)(3) nonprofit organization founded in the United States that help individuals borrow from an inventory of thousands of items that range from basic hand tools and table saws to ice cream makers and camping equipment. Chicago Tool Library was founded in 2019 and is headquartered in Chicago. The organization operates through a warehouse location in the West Garfield Park neighborhood.

== History ==
The Chicago Tool Library started in the summer of 2019 in Bridgeport on the southside of Chicago as a community-driven organization that loaned donated tools. The inventory was wide-ranging from the beginning, ranging from power tools to masonry, woodworking and food-preparation equipment. Becoming a member of the Chicago Tool Library requires you to be a Chicago resident. Membership fees are pay-what-you-can to ensure the service is accessible to all.

The organization drew enough interest that a move to the West Garfield Park neighborhood, in a space six times larger than the library's original home, was necessary. The library opened its doors at the new location in 2023.

In late 2023, it was reported that the organization had 6,000 members.

== See also ==
- tool library
