= Hold Me Tight (disambiguation) =

"Hold Me Tight" is a 1963 song by the Beatles.

Hold Me Tight may also refer to:

== Film and television ==
- Hold Me Tight (1933 film), an American film
- Hold Me Tight (2010 film), a Danish film
- Hold Me Tight (2021 film), a French film
- Hold Me Tight (TV series), a 2018 South Korean TV series

== Music ==
=== Albums ===
- Hold Me Tight, by Shirley Bassey, 2013
- Hold Me Tight, by Yasuhiro Abe, 1983

=== Songs ===
- "Hold Me Tight" (Cold Chisel song), 1983
- "Hold Me Tight" (Johnny Nash song), 1968
- "Hold Me Tight", by Asian Kung-Fu Generation from I'm Standing Here
- "Hold Me Tight", by Billy "Crash" Craddock from Changes
- "Hold Me Tight", by BTS from The Most Beautiful Moment in Life, Pt. 1
- "Hold Me Tight", by Loco
- "Hold Me Tight", by Missy Higgins, a B-side of the single "The Sound of White"
- "Hold Me Tight", by Paul McCartney and Wings from Red Rose Speedway
- "Hold Me Tight", by Scorpions from Animal Magnetism
- "Hold Me Tight", by Twice from Signal

== Books ==
- Hold Me Tight: Seven Conversations for a Lifetime of Love, by Sue Johnson, 2008

== See also ==
- "Hold Me Tight or Don't", a song by Fall Out Boy
- Hold Tight (disambiguation)
- Hold On Tight (disambiguation)
- Hold You Tight (disambiguation)
- Abrázame muy fuerte (disambiguation)
