= Ninezero =

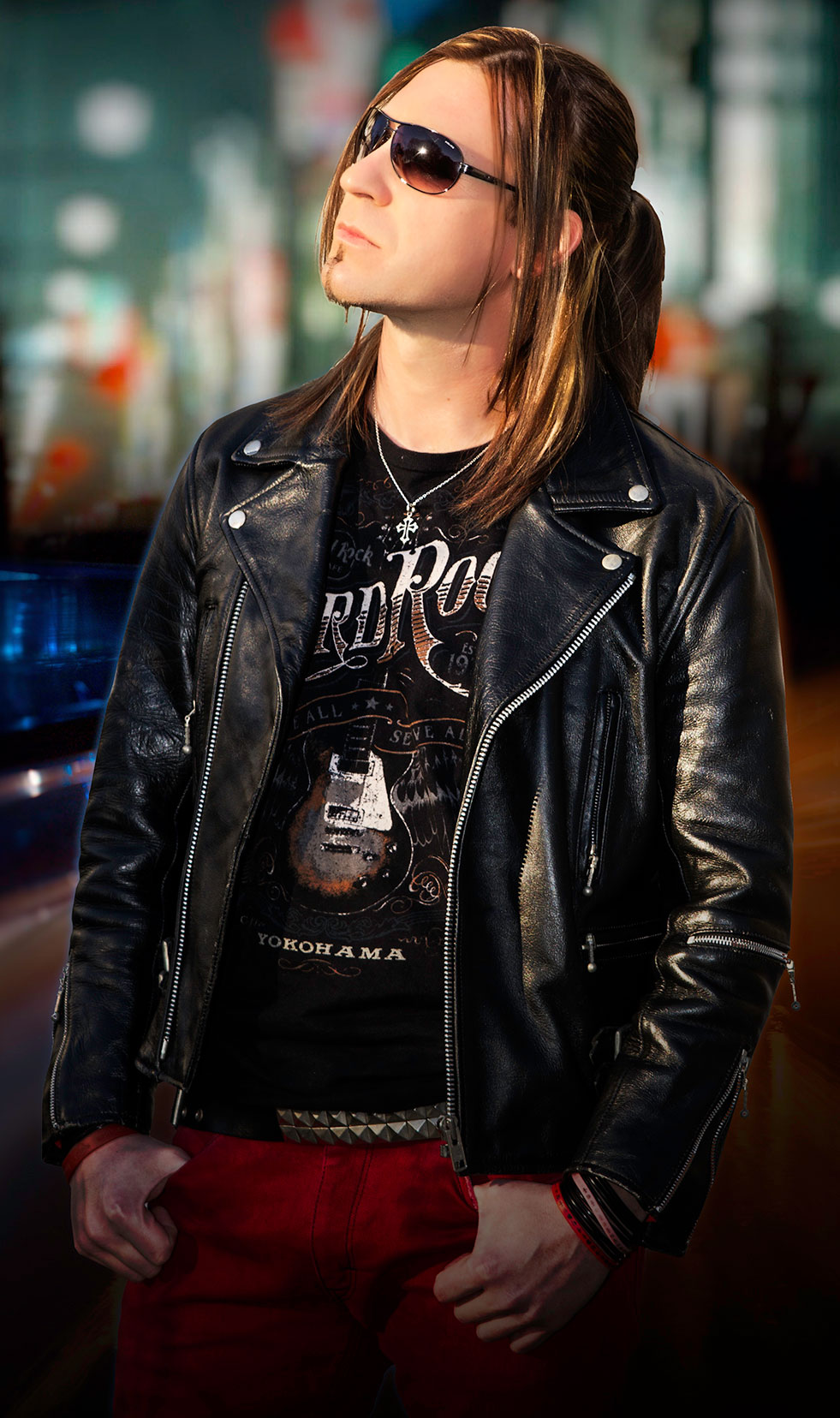
- Ninezero

Background information
- Born: Craig Andrew Schweizer; 18 October; Sydney, Australia
- Genres: Heavy metal, hard rock
- Occupations: Vocalist, songwriter
- Instrument: Vocal
- Years active: 1989 – present

Ninezero (born Craig Andrew Schweizer, 18 October) is an Australian rock/metal singer, songwriter and musician. He is influenced by heavy metal and hard rock to create a new kind of sound, referred to as power cacophony metal. Born in Sydney, Australia. He lived in Japan for over 20 years and now currently resides in Sydney, Australia.

Ninezero started his singing career singing in his high school choir and in classic musicals, such as The King and I, Oklahoma! and Kiss Me, Kate at the Riverside Theatre Parramatta. He moved on to singing in rock and heavy metal bands after graduating from the University of Newcastle, Australia.

== Synthesizer V ==
Ninezero is known for his voice data bank on Synthesizer V, 9Z 1.0 and 9Z 2.0. This was released through Dreamtonics.

== Bands ==
=== Maziora The Band (2010–) ===
Ninezero joined forces with some of Japan's most famous musicians to form Maziora The Band. The line-up is Ninezero-vocals, Kentaro-guitar (gargoyle), Yoshito Onda-bass (Zamza, formerly from Judy and Mary, Presence) and Himawari-drums (Dustar-3, formerly from Sex Machineguns).

=== Solo (2007– ) ===
His solo career as Ninezero, adopting his own name as the band's name, began with 2008's album The Beginning. This album was followed up with Ninezero's debut CD Sanity released in 2009. Ninezero also sang the official theme song for WeROCK City, "Rock City" from The Beginning CD.

=== Raiden (2003–2007) ===
Ninezero was originally in a band called Raiden. Raiden broke into the Japananse market with 2006's first album Sound of Thunder. Several songs from the CD are used as background music in music interviews for WeROCK City.

== Discography ==
=== Maziora The Band ===
- Best Ass-Kickin Heavy Rock Vol.2 (2013)
- Best Ass-Kickin Heavy Rock Vol.1 (2011)

=== Solo ===
- Sanity (2009)
- The Beginning (2008)

=== Raiden ===
- Sound of Thunder (2006)

=== Guest appearances ===
- GREAT LEFTY: Live Forever (2015)
- D4: Dark Dreams Don't Die official soundtrack (2014)
- Kenjiro Murai "Bass Line" Soundtrack (2013)
- Guitar Freaks V5 and Drum Mania V5 Original Soundtracks CD (2008) – Far Beyond Blackened
- The Gitado Live Benami 10th Memorial event DVD (2008) – Inside-Out, and Fire in the Dark.
- Guitar Freaks V4 and Drum Mania V4 Rock X Rock CD (2007) – Inside-Out, Black Night – Deep Purple and Rock And Roll All Nite – Kiss.

== GuitarFreaks and DrumMania ==
Ninezero is also the singer of Konami's GuitarFreaks and DrumMania series. He first appeared in the GuitarFreaks and DrumMania series with his original song, Inside-Out, in GuitarFreaks V4 and DrumMania V4 in 2007. He also performed on two more tracks which were included in this series; Black Night – Deep Purple and Rock And Roll All Nite – Kiss. He performed Inside-Out and Fire in the Dark at The Gitado Live Bemani 10th Memorial event in 2007 with an attendance of over 2000 people at Zepp Tokyo in Tokyo, Japan. This performance was released on The Gitado Live Bemami 10th Anniversary Live DVD. Inside-Out, Black Night and Rock And Roll All Nite were released on the GuitarFreaks V4 and DrumMania V4 Rock X Rock CD by Konami in 2007. He released his second original song, Far Beyond Blackened in GuitarFreaks V5 and DrumMania V5 Rock To Infinity in 2008. This was followed by the inclusion of Far Beyond Blackened in GuitarFreaks V5 and DrumMania V5 Original Soundtracks CD in 2008.

== Other entertainment work ==
- Sings the theme song for Mr. Donuts, June 2015.
- Sings a song on D4: Dark Dreams Don't Die, an episodic video game developed by Access Games and published by Microsoft Studios exclusively for the Xbox One.
- Sings the theme song for Bacardi Rum, April 2012.
- Sings the theme song for DOCOMO Eigahasumahode TV commercial, March 2012.
- Sings the theme song for Spa-O TV commercial, August 2011.
- Sings the theme song for Tama Home TV commercial, July 2011, March 2012 and April 2013.
- Appears as Steve Wolf (Tony Wolf in English-language release), one of the characters in the Nintendo DS game Last Window 2010, as a rock singer.
- Performed in the promotional video for Heiwa's Kenken Aloha de Hawaii pachinko game based on the Wacky Races series in 2007.
- Sings the theme song for Namco's Pro Yakyuu Netsusuta 2006 game
