= SuperNova 2 =

SuperNova 2 can refer to:

- Type II supernova
- Dance Dance Revolution SuperNova 2, the Japanese version of the game
  - Dance Dance Revolution SuperNova 2 (2007 video game), the North American edition
