= Hold Tight =

Hold Tight may refer to:

== Music ==
=== Albums ===
- Hold Tight, by David Pomeranz, 2007
- Hold Tight, by Gregory Isaacs, 1997

=== Songs ===
- "Hold Tight" (Bread song), 1977; covered by Vicki Sue Robinson (1977)
- "Hold Tight" (Change song), 1981
- "Hold Tight" (Dave Dee, Dozy, Beaky, Mick & Tich song), 1966
- "Hold Tight" (Justin Bieber song), 2013
- "Hold Tight" (Madonna song), 2015
- "Hold Tight" (Sidney Bechet song) 1938; covered by The Andrews Sisters (1938) and Fats Waller (1939)
- "Hold Tight", by Bootsauce from Bull, 1992
- "Hold Tight", by Evelyn "Champagne" King from I'll Keep a Light On, 1995
- "Hold Tight", by Greg Johnson
- "Hold Tight", by Liverpool Express from Tracks, 1976
- "Hold Tight", by Mark Geary
- "Hold Tight", by Ratt from Collage, 1997
- "Hold Tight", by Sabrina Carpenter from Singular: Act I, 2018
- "Hold Tight", by Slum Village from Fantastic, Vol. 2, 2000

== Other uses ==
- Hold Tight (film), by Jack White (1923)
- Hold Tight (novel), by Harlan Coben (2008)
  - Hold Tight (miniseries), a 2022 Polish television series based on the novel of the same name by Harlan Coben
- Hold Tight!, a British pop/game show presented by Bob Carolgees

== See also ==
- Hold Tight, It's Lena, an album by Lena Zavaroni
- Hold Me Tight (disambiguation)
- Hold On Tight (disambiguation)
