= Hold On Tight =

Hold On Tight may refer to:

== Albums ==
- Hold On Tight (Solomon Burke and De Dijk album), by Solomon Burke and De Dijk, 2010
- Hold On Tight, by Kevin Chase, 2011
- Hold On Tight (Hey Monday album), by Hey Monday, 2008
- Hold On Tight, by Sweet Comfort Band, 1980

== Songs ==
- "Hold On Tight" (Archie Roach song), 1997
- "Hold On Tight" (Electric Light Orchestra song), 1981
- "Hold On Tight" (R3hab and Conor Maynard song), 2018
- "Hold On Tight" (Samantha Fox song), 1986
- "Hold On Tight", by Britney Spears from Britney Jean
- "Hold On Tight", by Marilyn
- "Hold On Tight", by Sistar from Sweet & Sour
- ""Hold on Tight" (Aespa song)", 2023

== Other ==
- "Hold on Tight!" (Inside No. 9), a fake episode of the TV series Inside No. 9 that was never broadcast.
- "Hold on Tight", a storyline in the science fiction comedy webtoon series Live with Yourself!

== See also ==
- Hold Tight (disambiguation)
- Hold Me Tight (disambiguation)
