= Dance Dance Revolution SuperNova =

2006 video game

- North American PlayStation 2 version cover art
- Developer: Konami
- Publisher: Konami
- Series: Dance Dance Revolution
- Platforms: Arcade, PlayStation 2
- Release: Arcade: EU: April 28, 2006; NA: May 2006; JP: July 12, 2006; PlayStation 2: NA: September 26, 2006; JP: January 25, 2007; EU: April 27, 2007; AU: May 23, 2007
- Genres: Music, exercise
- Modes: Single-player, multiplayer
- Arcade system: Bemani Python 2

Dance Dance Revolution SuperNova (Note: Japanese: Dansu Dansu Reboryūshon Sūpānova (ダンスダンスレボリューションスーパーノヴァ), stylized as DanceDanceRevolution SuperNOVA; officially shortened to DDR SN) is an arcade and PlayStation 2 game in the Dance Dance Revolution (DDR) series of music video games. It was produced by Konami and released through Betson Enterprises. The game was released in Europe on April 28, 2006, followed shortly by a North American release in May and a Japanese release on July 12.

It is the first DDR game released for the arcades since Dance Dance Revolution Extreme three years before, although there had been steady releases of DDR games for consoles in the interim. Instead of Bemani System 573 Digital, the arcade version was built using the PlayStation 2-based Bemani Python 2, which results in higher-quality graphics and superior sounds than previous games. Unlike previous DDR arcade releases, all versions have the same features and song list. It is the fifth arcade release in Europe, the third arcade release in North America, and the ninth arcade release in Japan.

== Gameplay ==
The game retains the same core gameplay of the series. During gameplay, arrows scroll from the bottom to the top of the screen towards stationary arrows known as the "Step Zone". Once they reach the zone, players step on the dance pad corresponding to the arrows and the game will then judge the accuracy of the timing. The rankings are as follow: "Marvelous", "Perfect", "Great", "Good", "Almost", and "Boo". The last two rankings are taken from the North American games and differ from the ones used for DDR Extreme, which respectively has "Boo" and "Miss".

There are also changes in modifiers. The game adds the option to turn off jumps. In addition to "Flat" (all arrows are the same color), and "Rainbow" (brightly colored arrows taken from Dance Dance Revolution Solo, previously named "Solo"), a "Note" arrow option is added, which recolors the arrows based on timing (e.g. red for 1/4 beat arrows, blue for 1/8 beat arrows, etc.). "Little", which removes all non-quarter beat arrows, has been renamed "Cut".

Aesthetic changes include the renaming of three difficulty options: "Light", "Standard", and "Heavy" to "Basic", "Difficult", and "Expert", respectively. The song selection screen is still displayed in the form of a song wheel, but all difficulties are now displayed at once, instead of having to be highlighted separately. Instead of pre-rendered videos, songs are set to randomly generated characters dancing in several backgrounds, though certain songs may replace them with pre-rendered videos instead.

Instead of a difficulty option shown after selecting play styles, the game presents a mode selection offering eight options: "Tutorial", "Easy", "Medium", "Difficult", "All Music", "Nonstop", "Challenge", and "Battle". Tutorial is a new addition: it teaches first-time players on the basics of the game, before offering them a chance to play a song out of a limited selection in Beginner difficulty. Easy, Medium, and Difficult modes take players to normal gameplay but restrict them to a limited selection of songs based on their difficulty. As the name indicates, the entire song list can only be accessed through the All Music mode. Nonstop and Challenge modes, retained from previous games, can also be accessed through the same mode selection. Finally, the game introduces "Battle" mode, a gimmick-based gameplay in which opposing players compete by sending modifiers to mess up each other's playthrough.

DDR SuperNova is the first in the series to support e-Amusement functionality. The service is used for Internet Ranking, updates, and content delivery. The service is not available outside of Asia. In addition, it was supposed to feature Link Data, designed to provide connectivity between the arcade and PS2 versions of the game, by means of a PS2 memory card. The reader was depicted in arcade flyers, but it was never released. This feature already existed in Dance Dance Revolution Extreme and several earlier releases, but used original PlayStation memory cards and readers instead, which SuperNova does not support. Supplier issues with Sony forced Konami to cancel the functionality. To compensate, Konami offered a coupon or soundtrack sampler for customers in North America who purchased the game in 2006.

=== Extra Stage ===
In the first SuperNova, the Extra Stage system introduced in DDRMAX returns. Scoring AA or better in the final stage on Expert or Challenge difficulty will net access to Extra Stage. A new boss song will be added, though players may choose any song for Extra Stage. Unlike in DDR Extreme, players are free to choose any difficulty, instead of being locked to Expert. What boss song they get depends on which game mode they selected; selecting Easy or Medium modes will add "Healing-D-Vision", while selecting Difficult or All Music modes will add "Fascination MAXX" and "Fascination (eternal love mix)". Regardless of which song they choose, they are forced to play it with several options turned on, including 1.5x speed, "Reverse" scroll (arrows come from top to bottom instead of the opposite), and "Rainbow" arrow option. The dance meter starts full and cannot be replenished if it goes down.

If players manage to pass "Healing-D-Vision" and "Fascination MAXX" in Extra Stage, they will gain access to One More Extra Stage. The only song available for selection is "CHAOS". During this stage, players are forced to play in Sudden Death dance meter, in which a single Good, Almost, Miss, or N.G. judgment will immediately end the game. All options are disabled.

SuperNova 2 overhauls the Extra Stage system: scoring A or better on any song prior to Final Stage will add a new boss song for that stage. Getting A will only unlock the boss song's difficulty corresponding to the one played on the required song, while getting AA or better will unlock all difficulties except for Challenge. Getting AA or better on the boss song will net players access to Extra Stage, which adds another boss song. Unlike previous games, players may change options for Extra Stage, though the dance meter will be limited to a non-renewable battery with up to 4 bars, the amount of which depends on the score attained during Final Stage. If they score AA or better on that boss song, the player will net access to Encore Extra Stage ("One More Extra Stage" in previous games). In yet another deviation, players may choose any song and set options, but their dance meter will still be set to "Sudden Death", in which scoring Good, Almost, Boo, or N.G. will end the game.

SuperNova 2 alters the Final, Extra and Encore Extra stages based on e-Amusement status in Asia, and unlock level status in North America. By default, "Unreal" is the Final Stage, "NGO" is the Extra Stage, and ""Trip Machine PhoeniX" is the Encore Extra Stage. It is possible to unlock "PARANOiA (HADES)", "Pluto", and "Pluto Relinquish" as Encore Extra Stages. Upon completing all unlock levels, all boss songs are available for regular play.

== Release ==
Dancing Stage SuperNova was previewed at ATEI 2006 from January 24, 2006, to January 26, 2006. The arcade machine used for the preview has a build date of January 8, 2006, and featured 230 songs, including 46 new songs for the arcade series. Dancing Stage SuperNova was released to European arcades on April 28, 2006.

Dance Dance Revolution SuperNova was released in May 2006 in North America, and on July 12, 2006, in Japan. The game premiered at the Tomorrowland Starcade at Disneyland in Anaheim, California. In addition to brand new machines, a small number of conversion kits were made available, allowing older cabinets to be upgraded to SuperNova. The SuperNova 2 conversion kit allowed new and upgraded SuperNova cabinets to run SuperNova 2.

The original SuperNova received an offline update on June 15, 2006, in North America and on July 15, 2006, in Europe, to fix timing issues and to offer two additional songs: "Fascination ~eternal love mix~" and "Flow (true style)". The Japanese release included this update at launch.

== Sequel ==
Dance Dance Revolution SuperNova 2
- North American cover artwork for Dance Dance Revolution SuperNova 2.
- Developer: Konami
- Publisher: Konami
- Series: Dance Dance Revolution; Bemani
- Engine: SuperNova 2
- Platforms: Arcade, PlayStation 2
- Release: Arcade: JP: August 22, 2007; NA: January 17, 2008; PlayStation 2: NA: September 25, 2007; JP: February 21, 2008; EU: October 3, 2008
- Genres: Music, Exercise
- Modes: Single-player, Multiplayer

Dance Dance Revolution SuperNova 2 (Note: Japanese: Dansu Dansu Reboryūshon SūpāNova Tsū (ダンスダンスレボリューションスーパーノヴァ2), stylized as DanceDanceRevolution SuperNOVA2; officially shortened to DDR SN2) was released on August 22, 2007 by Konami to Japanese arcades and on February 21, 2008 for the PlayStation 2 counterpart. In North America, a slightly different PlayStation 2 version was released first on September 25, 2007, before that region's arcade release on January 17, 2008. It is the final arcade release to be powered by the PlayStation 2 by means of the Python 2 arcade board.

SuperNova 2 features some changes to the series. It introduces a new scoring system that is retained in all future installments. The score cap is 1,000,000 and factors in Marvelous timing, making it an integral part of the gameplay instead of being restricted to courses. A full combo is not a prerequisite for AA or AAA ratings, which are now determined solely by score.

The game adds several new options, including 0.25x and 0.5x speed, Brake (arrows slow down when they are about to reach the Step Zone) and Wave (arrows bounce up and down as they reach the Step Zone, similar to a wave). Aesthetic additions include unique arrow shapes, character cut-ins which happen if players reach certain combo milestones, and a small marquee which displays the song title and artist during gameplay. It is also one of the few arcade DDR games which provides everyone with a character select screen before the gameplay proper; later games would restrict this to e-Amusement players. The mode selection from SuperNova has been simplified to offering just six options; Easy, Medium, and Difficult modes are replaced with "Beginner", which provides a limited selection of the song list, while All Music is renamed "Standard".

While the first SuperNova introduced e-Amusement in a limited fashion, the service is taken to its full advantage in SuperNova 2, a practice that would be replicated in future games. E-Amusement players are given additional information and stats and could participate in limited-time events. The game has a vast amount of post-release content delivered through e-Amusement up to a year after release. Since the service continues to be unavailable outside of Asia, Konami compensated this by sending codes to arcade operators which can be entered to unlock in-game content.

=== Other ===
The soundtrack of the game ranges from classic Konami Originals to new pop and dance standards. The console version in North America features songs by Justin Timberlake, Gwen Stefani, Ian Van Dahl and Goldfrapp. Also featured is EyeToy support for additional gameplay elements as well as mini-games using the camera and online play through the PlayStation Network allowing players to face-off with other players across the country. The game was well received as a solid addition to the DDR lineup.

== Music ==
The arcade release of SuperNova contains 304 songs, of which 120 are new to the arcade series. The new content includes 19 licensed songs, one time-limited license ("Beautiful Life"), 17 Konami originals, 29 Bemani crossovers, and 54 songs from previous console versions of Dance Dance Revolution. Two of the Konami originals, "Fascination ～eternal love mix～" and "Flow (True Style)", require the July 2006 arcade patch to be played.

The arcade release of SuperNova 2 contains 357 songs, of which 62 are new to the arcade series. The new content includes 15 licensed songs, 23 Konami originals, 9 Bemani crossovers, 9 songs from previous console versions of SuperNova, and 6 Challenge-only steps for older Dance Dance Revolution songs.

SuperNova and SuperNova 2 feature several songs based on anime themes:

- "Angelus -アンジェラス-" by Hitomi Shimatani is featured in Inuyasha as the opening theme for the final 14 episodes of season 6. This song is available in the arcade releases of Dance Dance Revolution SuperNova 2, X and X2. It is also available in the Japanese and North American releases of SuperNova 2 for the PlayStation 2.
- "Baby's Tears" by Miki Roberts, an alias for Riyu Kosaka, is an English song available in SuperNova for arcades and the PlayStation 2. A Japanese version, credited simply to Riyu Kosaka, was recorded as the opening theme for Sky Girls. It was included in the Japanese release of SuperNova for the PlayStation 2, and SuperNova 2 for arcade and non-Japanese PlayStation 2 releases. Both versions of the theme song are unavailable in subsequent arcade releases.
- "そばかす Freckles (KCP Re-Edit)" by Tiggy, an English Eurodance cover of "Freckles" by Judy and Mary, was previously available in DDRMAX, DDRMAX2 and Dance Dance Revolution Extreme. It is absent in the arcade release of SuperNova, and in subsequent arcade releases, but it is available in the North American release of SuperNova for the PlayStation 2.
- "Trust -DanceDanceRevolution mix-" by Tatsh featuring Yoko is the theme song for Yoko from Gurren Lagann. It is available in Dance Dance Revolution SuperNova 2 for arcades and the Japanese PlayStation 2, and in Dance Dance Revolution X for arcades and the North American PlayStation 2. In contrast to other anime themes available in SuperNova and SuperNova 2, "Trust -DanceDanceRevolution mix-" returns in every subsequent arcade release.
DDR SuperNOVA 2 Arcade soundtrack

Song	Artist	Note
Licensed songs (14 total)
"AIN'T NO MOUNTAIN HIGH ENOUGH"	SLOTH MUSIC PROJECT feat. MALAYA	cover of Marvin Gaye & Tammi Terrell
"ANGELUS -アンジェラス-"	島谷ひとみ	Sixth opening theme of 犬夜叉
"Burn Baby Burn"	SLOTH MUSIC PROJECT feat. ANDY L	cover of Ash
"COME CLEAN"	NM featuring Susan Z	from Dance Dance Revolution SuperNova (NA PS2) cover of Hilary Duff
"FAINT"	PEGASUS	cover of Linkin Park
"ME AGAINST THE MUSIC"	HELEN	from Dancemania EX8 cover of Britney Spears
"My Favorite Things"	SLOTH MUSIC PROJECT feat. ALISON WADE	cover of The Sound of Music
"stealth"	DAISUKE ASAKURA	New Konami Original
"SUNRISE (JASON NEVINS REMIX)	DURAN DURAN	
"switch"	DAISUKE ASAKURA ex. TЁЯRA	New Konami Original
"Trust -DanceDanceRevolution mix-"	Tatsh feat. ヨーコ	from 天元突破グレンラガン
"Two Months Off"	TECHNO MASTERS	cover of Underworld
"Unbelievable"	EMF	from the album Schubert Dip
"WAITING FOR TONIGHT"	P.A.T	from Dance Dance Revolution Extreme (NA PS2) cover of Jennifer Lopez
New Konami Original songs (11 total)
"A thing called LOVE"	D-crew 2 US	New Konami Original
"dream of love"	Kaori Nishina	New Konami Original
"Electrified"	SySF.	New Konami Original
"Every Day, Every Night (NM STYLE)"	LEA DROP feat. Ant Johnston	New Konami Original
"Freeway Shuffle"	dj TAKA	New Konami Original
"GIRIGILI門前雀羅" (GIRIGILI Monzen Jakura)	Cheki-ROWS	New Konami Original
"Music In The Rhythm"	nc ft. 触電	New Konami Original
"Shades of Grey"	Fracus	New Konami Original
"Vem brincar"	Caldeira feat. Téka Penteriche	New Konami Original
"volcano"	Yasuhiro Abe	New Konami Original
"Why not"	Darwin	New Konami Original
New From Console Version songs (8 total)
"Baby's Tears (スカイガールズ・オープニングテーマ)" (Baby's Tears (SKY GIRLS opening theme))	小坂りゆ	from Dance Dance Revolution SuperNova (JP PS2); Opening theme of Sky Girls
"Feelings Won't Fade (Extend Trance Mix)"	SySF.	from Dance Dance Revolution SuperNova (NA PS2)
"Flow (Jammin' Ragga Mix)"	Scotty D. revisits U1	from Dance Dance Revolution SuperNova (NA PS2)
"Fly away -mix del matador-"	Shawn the Horny Master feat. ChiyoTia	from Dance Dance Revolution SuperNova (NA PS2)
"Silver Platform -I wanna get your heart-"	U1 Reincarnates w/Leah	from Dance Dance Revolution SuperNova (NA PS2)
"SOUL CRASH"	nc ft. HARDCORE NATION	from Dance Dance Revolution SuperNova (JP PS2)
"Star Gate Heaven (FUTURE LOVE Mix)"	SySF. feat. Donna Burke	from Dance Dance Revolution SuperNova (NA PS2)
"Trim"	kobo	from Dance Dance Revolution SuperNova (NA PS2)
BEMANI Crossover songs (7 total)
"Arrabbiata"	Reven-G改	from pop'n music 10
"Blind Justice ~Torn Souls, Hurt Faiths~"	Zektbach	from beatmania IIDX 14 GOLD
"Bloody Tears (IIDX EDITION)"	DJ YOSHITAKA	from beatmania IIDX 13 DistorteD
"CaptivAte ~誓い~" (CaptivAte ~Chikai~)	DJ YOSHITAKA feat. A/I	from beatmania IIDX 14 GOLD
"FIRE"	泉 陸奥彦	from GuitarFreaks
"Raspberry♥Heart (English version)"	jun feat. PAULA TERRY	from beatmania IIDX 11 IIDXRED
"Votum stellarum –forest #25 DDR RMX-"	iconoclasm	from pop'n music 15 ADVENTURE
Grand Cross Planet songs (10 total)
"MOONSTER"	kobo uniting Marsha & D.	from Dance Dance Revolution SuperNova (JP PS2); GRAND CROSS Planet Song#1; Represents Moon
"SUNKiSS♥DROP"	jun with Alison	New Konami Original; GRAND CROSS Planet Song#2; Represents Sun
"L'amour et la liberté (Darwin & DJ Silver remix)"	NAOKI in the MERCURE	New Konami Original; GRAND CROSS Planet Song#3; Represents Mercury
"Venus"	Tatsh+RayZY	from GuitarFreaks V3 & DrumMania V3; GRAND CROSS Planet Song#4; Represents Venus
"STARS★★★ (Re-tuned by HΛL) -DDR EDITION-"	TËЯRA	from beatmania IIDX 14 GOLD; GRAND CROSS Planet Song#5; Represents Earth
"MARS WAR 3"	JET GIRL SPIN	from pop'n music 13 カーニバル; GRAND CROSS Planet Song#6; Represents Mars
"木星～組曲『惑星』より" (Mokusei ~Kumikyoku "Wakusei" Yori)	PLEIADES PRODUCTION	Based on Jupiter, the Bringer of Jollity by Gustav Holst; GRAND CROSS Planet Song#7; Represents Jupiter
"Saturn"	Mr.Saturn	New Konami Original; GRAND CROSS Planet Song#8; Represents Saturn
"Uranus"	Tatsh SN 2 Style	New Konami Original; GRAND CROSS Planet Song#9; Represents Uranus
"Poseidon"	NAOKI underground	New Konami Original; GRAND CROSS Planet Song#10; Represents Neptune
Groove Radar Special songs (6 total)
"AM-3P("CHAOS" Special)"	KTz	Maxing out Chaos aspect Original song from Dance Dance Revolution 2ndMix
"B4U("VOLTAGE" Special)"	NAOKI	Maxing out Voltage aspect Original song from Dance Dance Revolution 4thMix
"BRILLIANT 2U("STREAM" Special)"	NAOKI	Maxing out Stream aspect Original song from Dance Dance Revolution 2ndMix
"D2R("FREEZE" Special)"	NAOKI	Maxing out Freeze aspect Original song from DDRMAX2 Dance Dance Revolution 7thMix
"DEAD END("GROOVE RADAR" Special)"	N&S	Maxing out all aspects Original song from Dance Dance Revolution 3rdMix
"DYNAMITE RAVE("AIR" Special)"	NAOKI	Maxing out Air aspect Original song from Dance Dance Revolution 3rdMix
Boss songs (6 total)
"Unreal"	Black Rose Garden	New Konami Original; Final Stage
"NGO"	鍋嶋圭一	New Konami Original; Extra Stage
"TRIP MACHINE PhoeniX"	DE-SIRE改	New Konami Original; Encore Extra Stage#1
"PARANOiA (HADES)"	αTYPE-300	New Konami Original; Encore Extra Stage#2
"Pluto"	Black∞Hole	New Konami Original; Encore Extra Stage#3; GRAND CROSS Planet Song#11; Represents Pluto
"Pluto Relinquish"	2MB	New Konami Original; Encore Extra Stage#4; GRAND CROSS Planet Song#12; Represents Pluto's Demotion
Removed songs (8 total)
"gentle stress (SENSUAL MIX)"	MR.DOG feat. DJ SWAN	from Dance Dance Revolution 3rdMix
"Jam Jam Reggae (AMD SWING MIX)"	RICE.C feat. jam master'73	from Dance Dance Revolution 3rdMix
"20, november"	DJ nagureo	from Dance Dance Revolution 2ndMix Club Version
"Be in my paradise"	JJ COMPANY	from Dance Dance Revolution 2ndMix Club Version
"celebrate"	JJ COMPANY	from Dance Dance Revolution 2ndMix Club Version
"Dr.LOVE"	baby weapon feat.Asuka.M	from Dance Dance Revolution 2ndMix Club Version
"Jam Jam Reggae"	jam master'73	from Dance Dance Revolution 2ndMix Club Version
"ska a go go"	THE BALD HEADS	from Dance Dance Revolution 2ndMix Club Version

DDR SuperNOVA 2 North American PlayStation 2 soundtrack

Song	Artist	Note
Default songs (28 total)
"And Then We Kiss (Junkie XL Mix)"	Britney Spears	from the album B in the Mix: The Remixes
"ANGELUS"	Hitomi Shimatani	Sixth opening theme of 犬夜叉
"Beginning of the End"	Klayton (Celldweller)	from the EP Celldweller
"Can't Stop the Rain"	Cascada	from the album Everytime We Touch
"dream of love"	Kaori Nishina	from Dance Dance Revolution SuperNova 2
"EternuS"	Sanxion7	
"Every Little Step"	Bobby Brown	from the album Don't Be Cruel
"Faster Kill Pussycat"	Paul Oakenfold feat. Brittany Murphy	from the album A Lively Mind
"Fevah"	Nightriders	
"Got To Be Real"	Cheryl Lynn	from the album Cheryl Lynn
"He Said She Said"	Ashley Tisdale	from the album Headstrong
"Just A Girl (Radio Edit)"	Ian Van Dahl	
"LE FREAK"	CHIC	from the album C'est Chic
"Love On My Mind (Radio Mix)"	Freemasons feat. Amanda Wilson	from the album Shakedown
"Number 1 (Alan Braxe & Fred Falke Main Remix)"	Goldfrapp	
"Rock Your Body"	Justin Timberlake	from the album Justified
"Say Goodbye"	Chris Brown	from the album Chris Brown
"Strict Machine"	Goldfrapp	from the album Black Cherry
"Suddenly I See"	KT Tunstall	from the album Eye to the Telescope
"Take On Me"	A-ha	from Dancing Stage SuperNova (EU PS2) from the album Hunting High and Low
"Temperature"	Sean Paul	from the album The Trinity
"The Rockafeller Skank"	Fatboy Slim	from Dancing Stage Unleashed 3 from the album You've Come a Long Way, Baby
"The World Around Me"	DJ Micro	
"Unbelievable"	EMF	from the album Schubert Dip
"Until Forever"	Beatdrop	
"Unwritten (Vicious Club Mix)"	Natasha Bedingfield	
"volcano"	Yasuhiro Abe	from Dance Dance Revolution SuperNova 2
"Wind It Up (Original Neptunes Mix)"	Gwen Stefani	from the album The Sweet Escape
New Konami Original songs (12 total)
"A thing called LOVE"	D-crew 2 US	from Dance Dance Revolution SuperNova 2
"Arrabbiata"	Reven-G alterative	from pop'n music 10
"dazzle"	kobo feat. kr:agué	New Konami Original
"Electrified"	SySF.	from Dance Dance Revolution SuperNova 2
"Every Day, Every Night (NM STYLE)"	LEA DROP feat. Ant Johnston	from Dance Dance Revolution SuperNova 2
"FIRE"	Mutsuhiko Izumi	from GuitarFreaks
"Freeway Shuffle"	dj TAKA	from Dance Dance Revolution SuperNova 2
"Malacca"	nc ft NRG Factory	New Konami Original
"Music In The Rhythm"	nc ft. Electric Touch	from Dance Dance Revolution SuperNova 2
"Raspberry♥Heart (English version)"	jun feat. PAULA TERRY	from beatmania IIDX 11 IIDXRED
"STARS★★★ (Re-tuned by HΛL) -DDR EDITION-"	TËЯRA	from beatmania IIDX 14 GOLD; Represents Earth
"Vem brincar"	Caldeira feat. Téka Penteriche	from Dance Dance Revolution SuperNova 2
Returning Konami Original songs (27 total)
"Baby's Tears (SKY GIRLS opening theme)"	RIYU KOSAKA	from Dance Dance Revolution SuperNova (JP PS2); Opening theme of Sky Girls
"bag"	RevenG	from Dance Dance Revolution Extreme
"BAILA! BAILA!"	DANDY MINEIRO	from Dance Maniax
"BALLAD FOR YOU"	NM feat. Thomas Howard	from beatmania IIDX 6th Style
"CALICO CAT ROCK"	ANETTAI MAJI-SKA BAKUDAN	from GuitarFreaks 8thMix & DrumMania 7thMix
"cachaca"	Mokky de Yah Yah's	from GuitarFreaks 8thMix & DrumMania 7thMix
"CRASH!"	mr.BRIAN & THE FINAL BAND	from Dancing Stage Euromix 2
"DanDanDO (The true MAN's Road)"	Des-ROW•UNITED	from pop'n music 9
"Dragon Blade"	Kozo Nakamura	from GuitarFreaks 11thMix & DrumMania 10thMix
"e-motion"	e.o.s	from beatmania
"Feelings Won't Fade (Extend Trance Mix)"	SySF.	from Dance Dance Revolution SuperNova (NA PS2)
"Flowers"	TЁЯRA	from Dance Dance Revolution SuperNova
"HONEY♂PUNCH"	RIYU KOSAKA	from Dance Dance Revolution SuperNova
"Hunting for you"	Togo Project feat. Megu & Scotty D.	from beatmania 4thMix -the beat goes on
"HYPER EUROBEAT"	NAOKI feat. DDR ALL STARS	from Dance Dance Revolution Extreme
"KISS KISS KISS"	NAOKI feat. SHANTI	from Dance Maniax 2ndMix
"Konoko no nanatsu no oiwaini"	Asaki	from GuitarFreaks 10thMix & DrumMania 9thMix
"La Bamba"	LH MUSIC CREATION	from Dance Dance Revolution SuperNova cover of a classic Mexican folk song
"MONDO STREET"	Orange Lounge	from DrumMania 2ndMix
"Morning Glory"	BeForU	from Dance Dance Revolution SuperNova
"NIJIIRO"	DJ YOSHITAKA feat. G.S.C. license	from pop'n music 13 カーニバル
"OUTER LIMITS"	L.E.D.-G	from beatmania IIDX 6th Style (PS2)
"rainbow flyer"	dj TAKA	from beatmania IIDX 8th Style
"SEDUCTION (Vocal Remix)"	NC feat. NRG Factory	from Dance Dance Revolution SuperNova
"Silver Platform -I wanna get your heart-"	U1 Reincarnates w/Leah	from Dance Dance Revolution SuperNova (NA PS2)
"Trim"	kobo	from Dance Dance Revolution SuperNova (NA PS2)
"Under the Sky"	Sayaka Minami (BeForU with platoniX)	from beatmania IIDX 12 HAPPY SKY
Boss songs (5 total)
"Fascination -eternal love mix-"	2MB	from Dance Dance Revolution SuperNova
"NGO"	Keiichi Nabeshima	from Dance Dance Revolution SuperNova 2
"Unreal"	Black Rose Garden	from Dance Dance Revolution SuperNova 2
"TRIP MACHINE PhoeniX"	DE-SIRE alterative	from Dance Dance Revolution SuperNova 2
"PARANOiA (HADES)"	αTYPE-300	from Dance Dance Revolution SuperNova 2

DDR SuperNOVA 2 Japanese PlayStation 2 soundtrack

Song	Artist	Note
Licensed songs (16 total)
"AIN'T NO MOUNTAIN HIGH ENOUGH"	SLOTH MUSIC PROJECT feat. MALAYA	cover of Marvin Gaye & Tammi Terrell
"ANGELUS -アンジェラス-"	島谷ひとみ	Sixth opening theme of 犬夜叉
"Beginning of the End"	Klayton (Celldweller)	from the EP Celldweller
"Burn Baby Burn"	SLOTH MUSIC PROJECT feat. ANDY L	cover of Ash
"COME CLEAN"	NM featuring Susan Z	from Dance Dance Revolution SuperNova (NA PS2) cover of Hilary Duff
"EternuS"	Sanxion7	
"Fevah"	Nightriders	
"My Favorite Things"	SLOTH MUSIC PROJECT feat. ALISON WADE	cover of The Sound of Music
"stealth"	DAISUKE ASAKURA	from Dance Dance Revolution SuperNova 2
"SUNRISE (JASON NEVINS REMIX)	DURAN DURAN	
"switch"	DAISUKE ASAKURA ex. TЁЯRA	from Dance Dance Revolution SuperNova 2
"The World Around Me"	DJ Micro	
"Two Months Off"	TECHNO MASTERS	cover of Underworld
"Unbelievable"	EMF	from the album Schubert Dip
"Until Forever"	Beatdrop	
"WAITING FOR TONIGHT"	P.A.T	from Dance Dance Revolution Extreme (NA PS2) cover of Jennifer Lopez
New Konami Original songs (7 total)
"dazzle"	kobo feat. kr:agué	from Dance Dance Revolution SuperNova 2 (NA PS2)
"LEAVE ME ALONE"	TUT1026	from the album エブリバディー
"Malacca"	nc ft. NRG Factory	from Dance Dance Revolution SuperNova 2 (NA PS2)
"puzzle"	日本少年	New Konami Original
"S・A・G・A"	Veeton	New Konami Original
"The flower in your smile"	TACOS NAOMI feat.小久保裕之	New Konami Original
"TimeHollow"	Masanori Akita	New Konami Original; Theme song of Time Hollow
New Arcade Konami Original songs (18 total)
"A thing called LOVE"	D-crew 2 US	from Dance Dance Revolution SuperNova 2
"dream of love"	Kaori Nishina	from Dance Dance Revolution SuperNova 2
"Electrified"	SySF.	from Dance Dance Revolution SuperNova 2
"Every Day, Every Night (NM STYLE)"	LEA DROP feat. Ant Johnston	from Dance Dance Revolution SuperNova 2
"Freeway Shuffle"	dj TAKA	from Dance Dance Revolution SuperNova 2
"GIRIGILI門前雀羅" (GIRIGILI Monzen Jakura)	Cheki-ROWS	from Dance Dance Revolution SuperNova 2
"L'amour et la liberté (Darwin & DJ Silver remix)"	NAOKI in the MERCURE	from Dance Dance Revolution SuperNova 2 Represents Mercury
"木星～組曲『惑星』より" (Mokusei ~Kumikyoku "Wakusei" Yori)	PLEIADES PRODUCTION	Based on Jupiter, the Bringer of Jollity by Gustav Holst; Represents Jupiter
"Music In The Rhythm"	nc ft. 触電	from Dance Dance Revolution SuperNova 2
"Poseidon"	NAOKI underground	from Dance Dance Revolution SuperNova 2 Represents Neptune
"Saturn"	Mr.Saturn	from Dance Dance Revolution SuperNova 2 Represents Saturn
"Shades of Grey"	Fracus	from Dance Dance Revolution SuperNova 2
"SUNKiSS♥DROP"	jun with Alison	from Dance Dance Revolution SuperNova 2 Represents Sun
"Trust -DanceDanceRevolution mix-"	Tatsh feat. ヨーコ	from 天元突破グレンラガン
"Uranus"	Tatsh SN 2 Style	from Dance Dance Revolution SuperNova 2 Represents Uranus
"Vem brincar"	Caldeira feat. Téka Penteriche	from Dance Dance Revolution SuperNova 2
"volcano"	Yasuhiro Abe	from Dance Dance Revolution SuperNova 2
"Why not"	Darwin	from Dance Dance Revolution SuperNova 2
BEMANI Crossover songs (10 total)
"Arrabbiata"	Reven-G改	from pop'n music 10
"Blind Justice ~Torn Souls, Hurt Faiths~"	Zektbach	from beatmania IIDX 14 GOLD
"Bloody Tears (IIDX EDITION)"	DJ YOSHITAKA	from beatmania IIDX 13 DistorteD
"CaptivAte ~誓い~" (CaptivAte ~Chikai~)	DJ YOSHITAKA feat. A/I	from beatmania IIDX 14 GOLD
"FIRE"	泉 陸奥彦	from GuitarFreaks
"MARS WAR 3"	JET GIRL SPIN	from pop'n music 13 カーニバル; Represents Mars
"Raspberry♥Heart (English version)"	jun feat. PAULA TERRY	from beatmania IIDX 11 IIDXRED
"STARS★★★ (Re-tuned by HΛL) -DDR EDITION-"	TËЯRA	from beatmania IIDX 14 GOLD; Represents Earth
"Venus"	Tatsh+RayZY	from GuitarFreaks V3 & DrumMania V3; Represents Venus
"Votum stellarum –forest #25 DDR RMX-"	iconoclasm	from pop'n music 15 ADVENTURE
Returning Konami Original songs (20 total)
"AFRONOVA"	RE-VENGE	from Dance Dance Revolution 3rdMix
"AM-3P"	KTz	from Dance Dance Revolution 2ndMix
"B4U"	NAOKI	from Dance Dance Revolution 4thMix
"BRILLIANT 2U"	NAOKI	from Dance Dance Revolution 2ndMix
"CAN'T STOP FALLIN' IN LOVE"	NAOKI	from Dance Dance Revolution Solo 2000
"CANDY☆"	Luv UNLIMITED	from DDRMAX Dance Dance Revolution 6thMix
"D2R"	NAOKI	from DDRMAX2 Dance Dance Revolution 7thMix
"DEAD END"	N&S	from Dance Dance Revolution 3rdMix
"DROP THE BOMB"	Scotty D.	from Dance Dance Revolution 3rdMix (PS)
"DYNAMITE RAVE"	NAOKI	from Dance Dance Revolution 3rdMix
"Groove"	Sho-T feat. Brenda	from Dance Dance Revolution 4thMix (PS)
"INSIDE YOUR HEART"	AKIRA YAMAOKA	from Dance Dance Revolution Extreme 2
"Kind Lady"	OKUYATOS	from DDRMAX Dance Dance Revolution 6thMix (PS2)
"Look To The Sky"	SySF. feat. ANNA	from Dance Dance Revolution 5thMix (PS)
"PARANOiA"	180	from Dance Dance Revolution
"STILL IN MY HEART"	NAOKI	from Dance Dance Revolution 5thMix
"Sweet Sweet ♥ Magic"	jun	from DDRMAX2 Dance Dance Revolution 7thMix
"TOMORROW"	nc ft. Dreamscanner	from Dance Dance Revolution Extreme 2
"TRUE♥LOVE"	jun with Schanita	from Dance Dance Revolution SuperNova
"un deux trois"	SDMS	from Dance Dance Revolution Extreme (JP PS2)
Groove Radar Special songs (6 total)
"AM-3P("CHAOS" Special)"	KTz	from Dance Dance Revolution SuperNova 2 Maxing out Chaos aspect Original song from Dance Dance Revolution 2ndMix
"B4U("VOLTAGE" Special)"	NAOKI	from Dance Dance Revolution SuperNova 2 Maxing out Voltage aspect Original song from Dance Dance Revolution 4thMix
"BRILLIANT 2U("STREAM" Special)"	NAOKI	from Dance Dance Revolution SuperNova 2 Maxing out Stream aspect Original song from Dance Dance Revolution 2ndMix
"D2R("FREEZE" Special)"	NAOKI	from Dance Dance Revolution SuperNova 2 Maxing out Freeze aspect Original song from DDRMAX2 Dance Dance Revolution 7thMix
"DEAD END("GROOVE RADAR" Special)"	N&S	from Dance Dance Revolution SuperNova 2 Maxing out all aspects Original song from Dance Dance Revolution 3rdMix
"DYNAMITE RAVE("AIR" Special)"	NAOKI	from Dance Dance Revolution SuperNova 2 Maxing out Air aspect Original song from Dance Dance Revolution 3rdMix
Boss songs (6 total)
"Unreal"	Black Rose Garden	from Dance Dance Revolution SuperNova 2 Final Stage
"NGO"	鍋嶋圭一	from Dance Dance Revolution SuperNova 2 Extra Stage
"TRIP MACHINE PhoeniX"	DE-SIRE改	from Dance Dance Revolution SuperNova 2 Encore Extra Stage#1
"PARANOiA (HADES)"	αTYPE-300	from Dance Dance Revolution SuperNova 2 Encore Extra Stage#2
"Pluto"	Black∞Hole	from Dance Dance Revolution SuperNova 2 Encore Extra Stage#3; Represents Pluto
"Pluto Relinquish"	2MB	from Dance Dance Revolution SuperNova 2 Encore Extra Stage#4; Represents Pluto's Demotion

Dancing Stage SuperNOVA 2 European PlayStation 2 soundtrack

Song	Artist	Note
Licensed songs (15 total)
"Beginning of the End"	Klayton (Celldweller)	from the EP Celldweller
"Cara Mia"	Måns Zelmerlöw	from the album Stand By For...
"EternuS"	Sanxion7	
"Every Little Step"	Bobby Brown	from the album Don't Be Cruel
"Faster Kill Pussycat"	Paul Oakenfold feat. Brittany Murphy	from the album A Lively Mind
"Fevah"	Nightriders	
"LE FREAK"	CHIC	from the album C'est Chic
"Number 1 (Alan Braxe & Fred Falke Main Remix)"	Goldfrapp	from the album We Are Glitter
"Rock Your Body"	Justin Timberlake	from the album Justified
"Strict Machine"	Goldfrapp	from the album Black Cherry
"Suddenly I See"	KT Tunstall	from the album Eye to the Telescope
"The World Around Me"	DJ Micro	
"Unbelievable"	EMF	from the album Schubert Dip
"Until Forever"	Beatdrop	
"Wind It Up (Original Neptunes Mix)"	Gwen Stefani	from the album The Sweet Escape
Konami Original songs (22 total)
"A thing called LOVE"	D-crew 2 US	from Dance Dance Revolution SuperNova 2
"Baby's Tears (SKY GIRLS opening theme)"	RIYU KOSAKA	from Dance Dance Revolution SuperNova (JP PS2); Opening theme of Sky Girls
"bag"	RevenG	from Dance Dance Revolution Extreme
"CRASH!"	mr.BRIAN & THE FINAL BAND	from Dancing Stage EuroMIX 2
"dazzle"	kobo feat. kr:agué	from Dance Dance Revolution SuperNova 2 (NA PS2)
"dream of love"	Kaori Nishina	from Dance Dance Revolution SuperNova 2
"Electrified"	SySF.	from Dance Dance Revolution SuperNova 2
"Every Day, Every Night (NM STYLE)"	LEA DROP feat. Ant Johnston	from Dance Dance Revolution SuperNova 2
"Feelings Won't Fade (Extend Trance Mix)"	SySF.	from Dance Dance Revolution SuperNova (NA PS2)
"Flowers"	TЁЯRA	from Dance Dance Revolution SuperNova
"Freeway Shuffle"	dj TAKA	from Dance Dance Revolution SuperNova 2
"HONEY♂PUNCH"	RIYU KOSAKA	from Dance Dance Revolution SuperNova
"HYPER EUROBEAT"	NAOKI feat. DDR ALL STARS	from Dance Dance Revolution Extreme
"La Bamba"	LH MUSIC CREATION	from Dance Dance Revolution SuperNova cover of a classic Mexican folk song
"Malacca"	nc ft NRG Factory	from Dance Dance Revolution SuperNova 2 (NA PS2)
"Morning Glory"	BeForU	from Dance Dance Revolution SuperNova
"Music In The Rhythm"	nc ft. Electric Touch	from Dance Dance Revolution SuperNova 2
"SEDUCTION (Vocal Remix)"	NC feat. NRG Factory	from Dance Dance Revolution SuperNova
"Silver Platform -I wanna get your heart-"	U1 Reincarnates w/Leah	from Dance Dance Revolution SuperNova (NA PS2)
"Trim"	kobo	from Dance Dance Revolution SuperNova (NA PS2)
"Vem brincar"	Caldeira feat. Téka Penteriche	from Dance Dance Revolution SuperNova 2
"volcano"	Yasuhiro Abe	from Dance Dance Revolution SuperNova 2
BEMANI Crossover songs (19 total)
"Arrabbiata"	Reven-G alterative	from pop'n music 10
"BAILA! BAILA!"	DANDY MINEIRO	from Dance Maniax
"BALLAD FOR YOU"	NM feat. Thomas Howard	from beatmania IIDX 6th Style
"CALICO CAT ROCK"	ANETTAI MAJI-SKA BAKUDAN	from GuitarFreaks 8thMix & DrumMania 7thMix
"cachaca"	Mokky de Yah Yah's	from GuitarFreaks 8thMix & DrumMania 7thMix
"DanDanDO (The true MAN's Road)"	Des-ROW•UNITED	from pop'n music 9
"Dragon Blade"	Kozo Nakamura	from GuitarFreaks 11thMix & DrumMania 10thMix
"e-motion"	e.o.s	from beatmania
"FIRE"	Mutsuhiko Izumi	from GuitarFreaks
"Hunting for you"	Togo Project feat. Megu & Scotty D.	from beatmania 4thMix -the beat goes on
"KISS KISS KISS"	NAOKI feat. SHANTI	from Dance Maniax 2ndMix
"Konoko no nanatsu no oiwaini"	Asaki	from GuitarFreaks 10thMix & DrumMania 9thMix
"MONDO STREET"	Orange Lounge	from DrumMania 2ndMix
"NIJIIRO"	DJ YOSHITAKA feat. G.S.C. license	from pop'n music 13 カーニバル
"OUTER LIMITS"	L.E.D.-G	from beatmania IIDX 6th Style (PS2)
"rainbow flyer"	dj TAKA	from beatmania IIDX 8th Style
"Raspberry♥Heart (English version)"	jun feat. PAULA TERRY	from beatmania IIDX 11 IIDXRED
"STARS★★★ (Re-tuned by HΛL) -DDR EDITION-"	TËЯRA	from beatmania IIDX 14 GOLD; Represents Earth
"Under the Sky"	Sayaka Minami (BeForU with platoniX)	from beatmania IIDX 12 HAPPY SKY
Boss songs (5 total)
"Fascination -eternal love mix-"	2MB	from Dance Dance Revolution SuperNova
"NGO"	Keiichi Nabeshima	from Dance Dance Revolution SuperNova 2
"Unreal"	Black Rose Garden	from Dance Dance Revolution SuperNova 2
"TRIP MACHINE PhoeniX"	DE-SIRE alterative	from Dance Dance Revolution SuperNova 2
"PARANOiA (HADES)"	αTYPE-300	from Dance Dance Revolution SuperNova 2

=== Grand Cross ===
Grand Cross is a song series in Dance Dance Revolution SuperNova 2.

Grand Cross unlockable songs
Celestial object	Song title	Artist	Unlock date (Japan)	Unlock level (North America)
Sun	Sunkiss♥Drop	jun with Alison	August 26, 2007	Level 1
Mercury	L'amour et la liberté (Darwin & DJ Silver remix)	Naoki in the MERCURE	October 18, 2007	Level 2
Venus	Venus	Tatsh+RayZY	October 25, 2007	Level 2
Earth	Stars (Re-tuned by HAL) -DDR Edition-	TЁЯRA	November 29, 2007	Level 3
Moon	Moonster	kobo uniting Marsha & D.	August 26, 2007	Level 1
Mars	Mars War 3	Jet Girl Spin	December 6, 2007	Level 3
Jupiter	Jupiter, the Bringer of Jollity 木星～組曲『惑星』より	Pleiades Production	January 10, 2008	Level 4
Saturn	Saturn	Mr. Saturn	January 17, 2008	Level 4
Uranus	Uranus	Tatsh SN 2 Style	February 21, 2008	Level 5
Neptune	Poseidon	Naoki Underground	February 28, 2008	Level 5
Pluto	Pluto	Black∞Hole	March 27, 2008	Level MAX
Pluto	Pluto Relinquish	2MB	April 3, 2008	Level MAX

== Reception ==
=== Arcade ===
The original Dance Dance Revolution SuperNova arcade release in North America reached sales of about 250 brand new cabinets by distributor Betson. The company also released a smaller run of brand new Dance Dance Revolution SuperNova 2 cabinets, and upgrade kits for both SuperNova games. A Polygon article published in 2017 noted that these brand new machines used "lower quality footpads and monitors" compared to Asia, though still of better quality than the infamous Dance Dance Revolution X and X2 arcade releases in North America and Europe.

In October 2018, there were 337 public SuperNova and SuperNova 2 arcade machines available worldwide, of which 253 were located in the Americas. As of August 2021, there are 301 public SuperNova and SuperNova 2 machines worldwide.

=== PlayStation 2 ===
Dance Dance Revolution SuperNova reception

Aggregate score
Aggregator	Score
Metacritic	73%

Review scores
Publication	Score
Eurogamer	6 / 10
GameSpot	7 / 10
IGN	7 / 10

Dance Dance Revolution SuperNova 2 reception

Aggregate score
Aggregator	Score
Metacritic	70%

Review scores
Publication	Score
GameSpot	5.5 / 10
IGN	7.3 / 10

The PlayStation 2 release of SuperNova and SuperNova 2 received mixed reviews. For the first title, GameSpot and IGN each gave it a 7 out of 10 rating. Eurogamer gave Dancing Stage SuperNova a 6 out of 10.

== Legacy ==
To celebrate the 20th anniversary of Dance Dance Revolution, Dance Dance Revolution A received a DDR Selection mode, featuring songs from older mixes. A dozen of songs from the DDR SuperNOVA series, with six per SuperNOVA game, can be played with the SuperNOVA 2 interface by using this mode. Dance Dance Revolution A20 also offers this mode.

In 2019, a love hotel in Kobe, Japan installed Dance Dance Revolution SuperNova in a hotel room.

Dance Dance Revolution A20 introduced a new cover of "Long Train Runnin'" by The Doobie Brothers as free downloadable content. The SuperNova series and DDR X feature a cover by X-Treme, whereas DDRMAX2 and DDR Extreme feature a cover by Bus Stop with different lyrics. The A20 cover incorporates lyrics from both the X-Treme and Bus Stop covers.

== Gallery ==
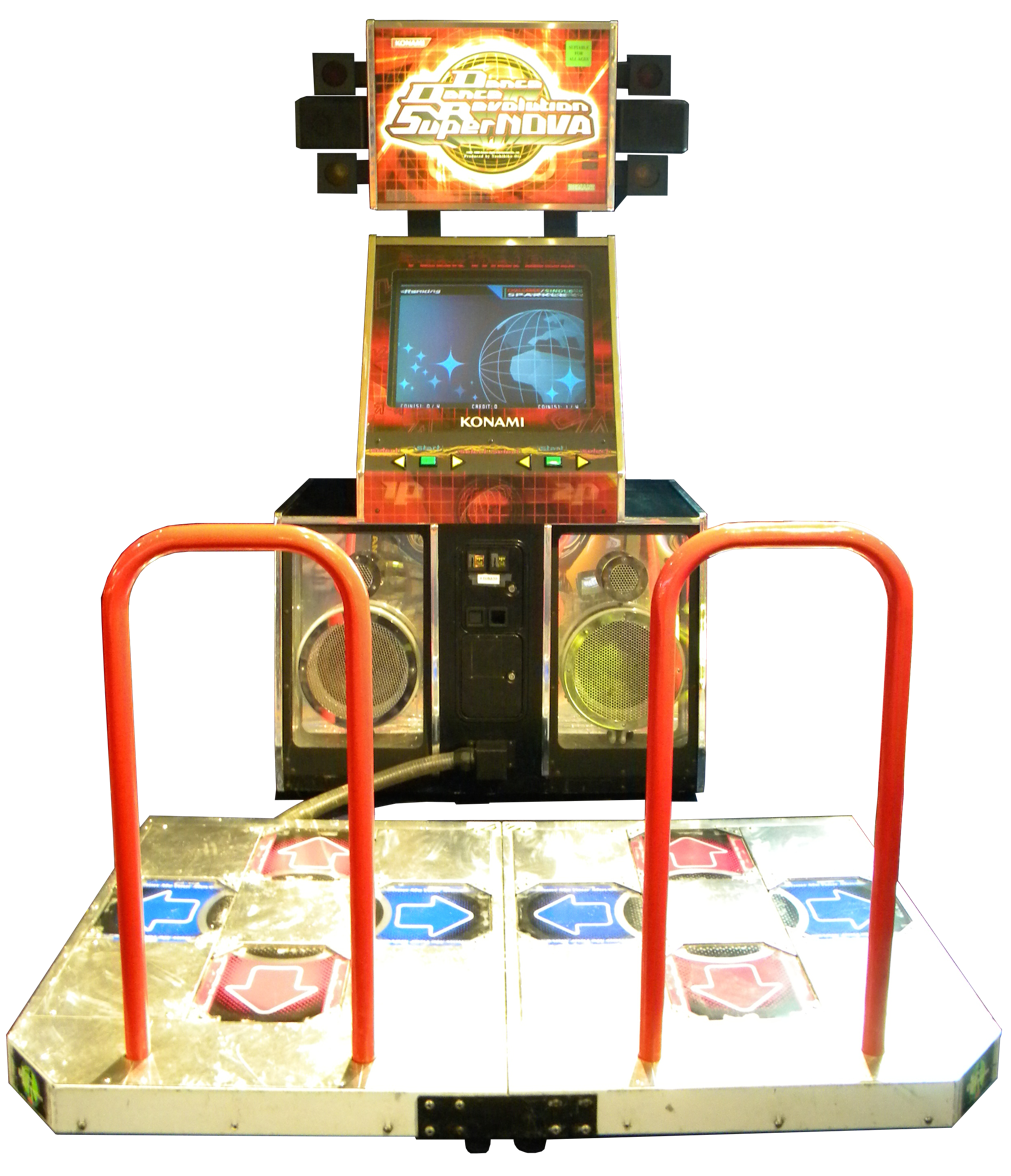
DDR SuperNova dedicated cabinet in North America

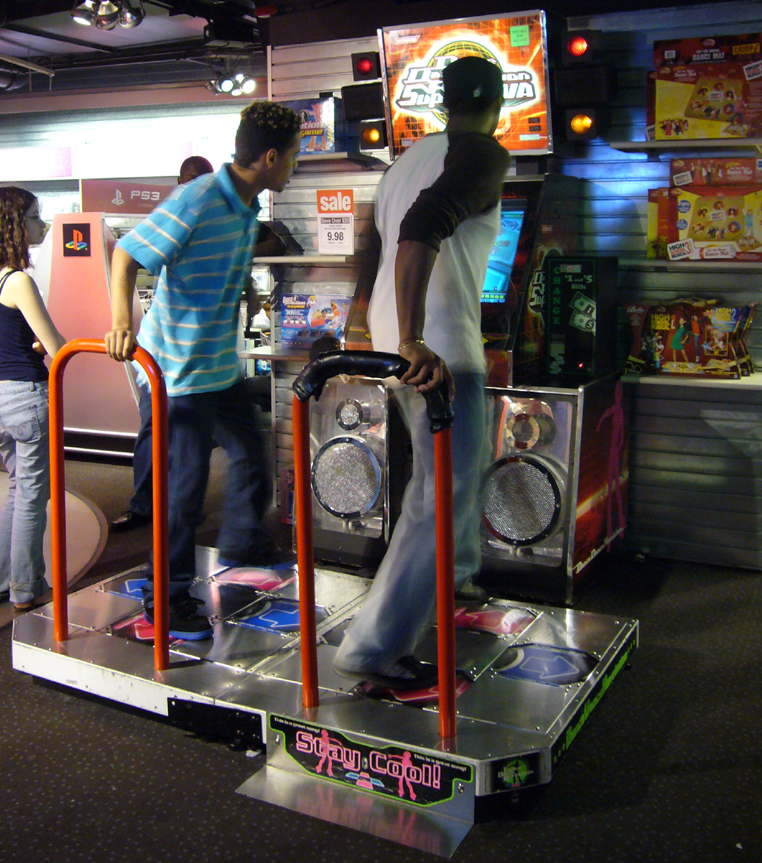
Cabinet at
Toys "R" Us

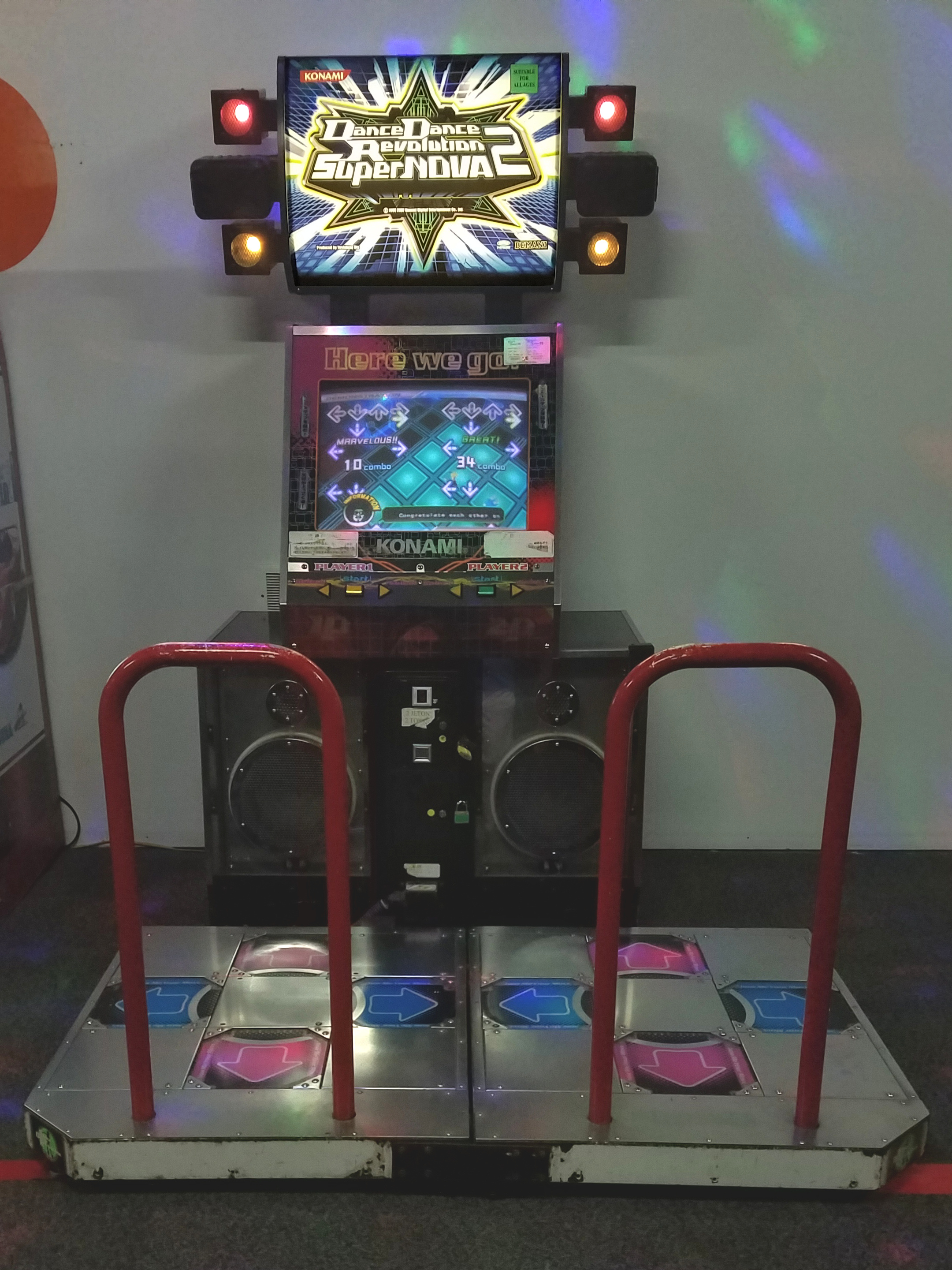
DDR SuperNova 2 cabinet (upgraded from DDR 5thMix)
