= Hold You Tight =

Hold You Tight may refer to:

- Hold You Tight (film), a 1998 Chinese-language film
- "Hold You Tight" (song), a 1991 song by Tara Kemp
- "Hold You Tight", a 2019 song by Chen from Dear My Dear
- "Hold You Tight", a 2019 song by Diplo

== See also ==
- Hold Me Tight (disambiguation)
