= GuitarFreaks and DrumMania =

1999 rhythm video game

- Developer: Bemani
- Publishers: Konami, Konami Digital Entertainment
- Platforms: Arcade; Microsoft Windows; PlayStation; PlayStation 2
- Release: February 16, 1999 (GuitarFreaks); July 10, 1999 (DrumMania)
- Genres: Music, Rhythm
- Modes: Single-player, multiplayer
- Arcade system: Bemani PC (current; also used for XG to XG3 and V4 to V8); Bemani Python 2 (V to V3; discontinued); System 573 (1st to 11thMix; discontinued)

Gitadora (ギタドラ) is a music video game series produced by Konami. The series consists of two games, GuitarFreaks and DrumMania, where players use game controllers modeled after musical instruments to perform the lead guitar, bass guitar and drums of numerous songs across a wide range of genres by matching scrolling musical notes patterns shown on screen. Players are scored for successfully-hit notes, but may fail a song if they miss too many notes. The series has featured numerous game modes, and supports both single-player and multiplayer modes where up to three players can perform together. Some earlier versions of the game could also be linked with Keyboardmania.

GuitarFreaks (ギターフリークス, Gitāfurīkusu) is a music video game series produced by Konami. It is a rhythm game where the player uses a controller to simulate the playing of an electric guitar. The game consists of music predominantly from the rock music, rock and roll and J-pop genres. It is considered one of the most influential video games of all time, for having laid the foundations for popular guitar-based rhythm games, such as the Guitar Hero series. Working Designs attempted to bring Guitar Freaks PlayStation 2 games to the U.S., but patent problems with the guitar controller prevented the project from moving forward.

DrumMania (ドラムマニア, Doramumania) is a drumming music video game series produced by Bemani, the musical division of Konami Digital Entertainment, Inc. It first released in 1999 as an arcade game, then subsequently ported to the Sony PlayStation 2 in Japan in 2000 as a launch title. Subsequent mixes have been released approximately once a year. In 2010, a series XG was introduced, adding a floor tom, left cymbal and a left pedal to the cabinet setup.

== History ==
=== System 573 era (1999–2004) ===
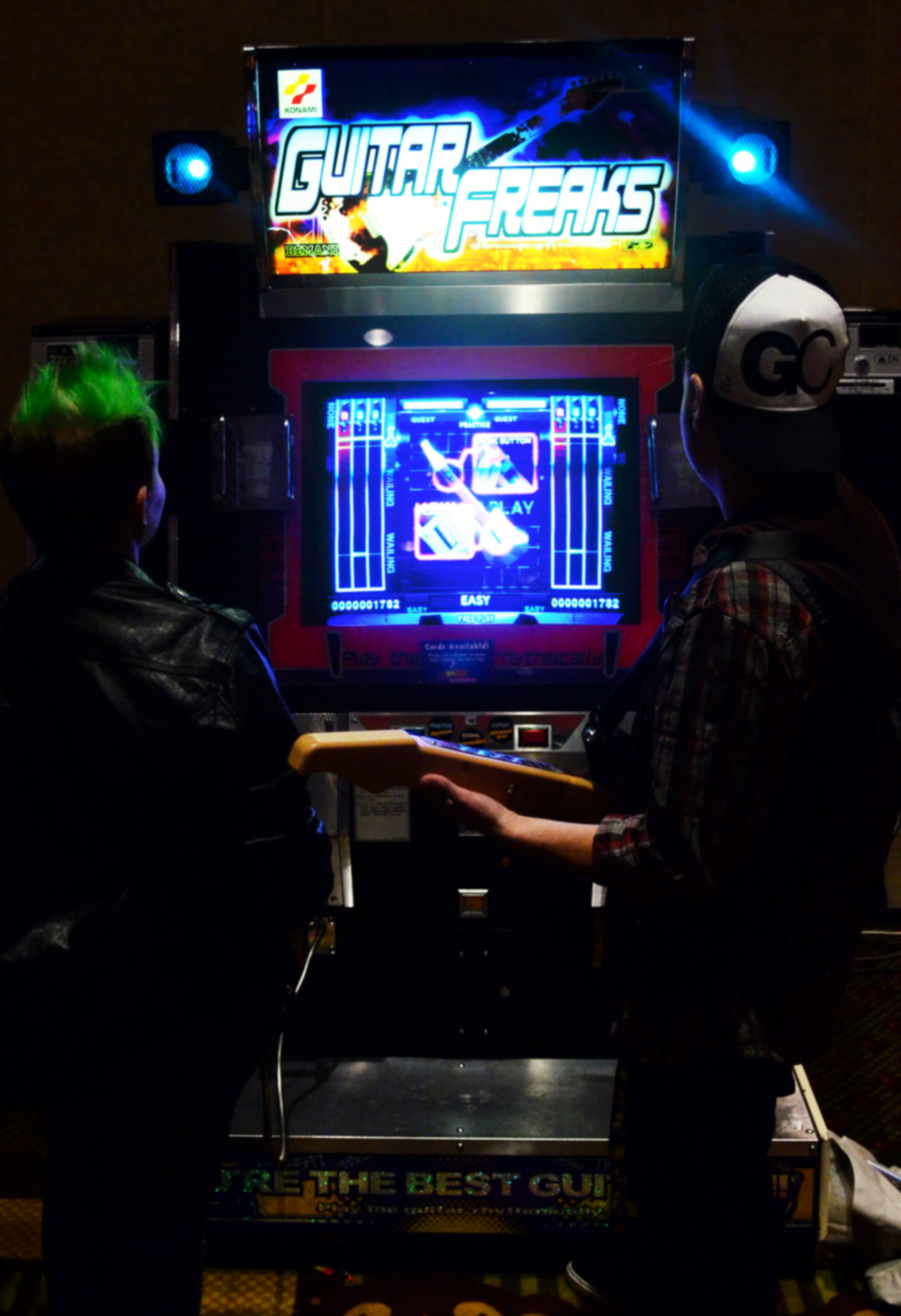
Original GuitarFreaks cabinet

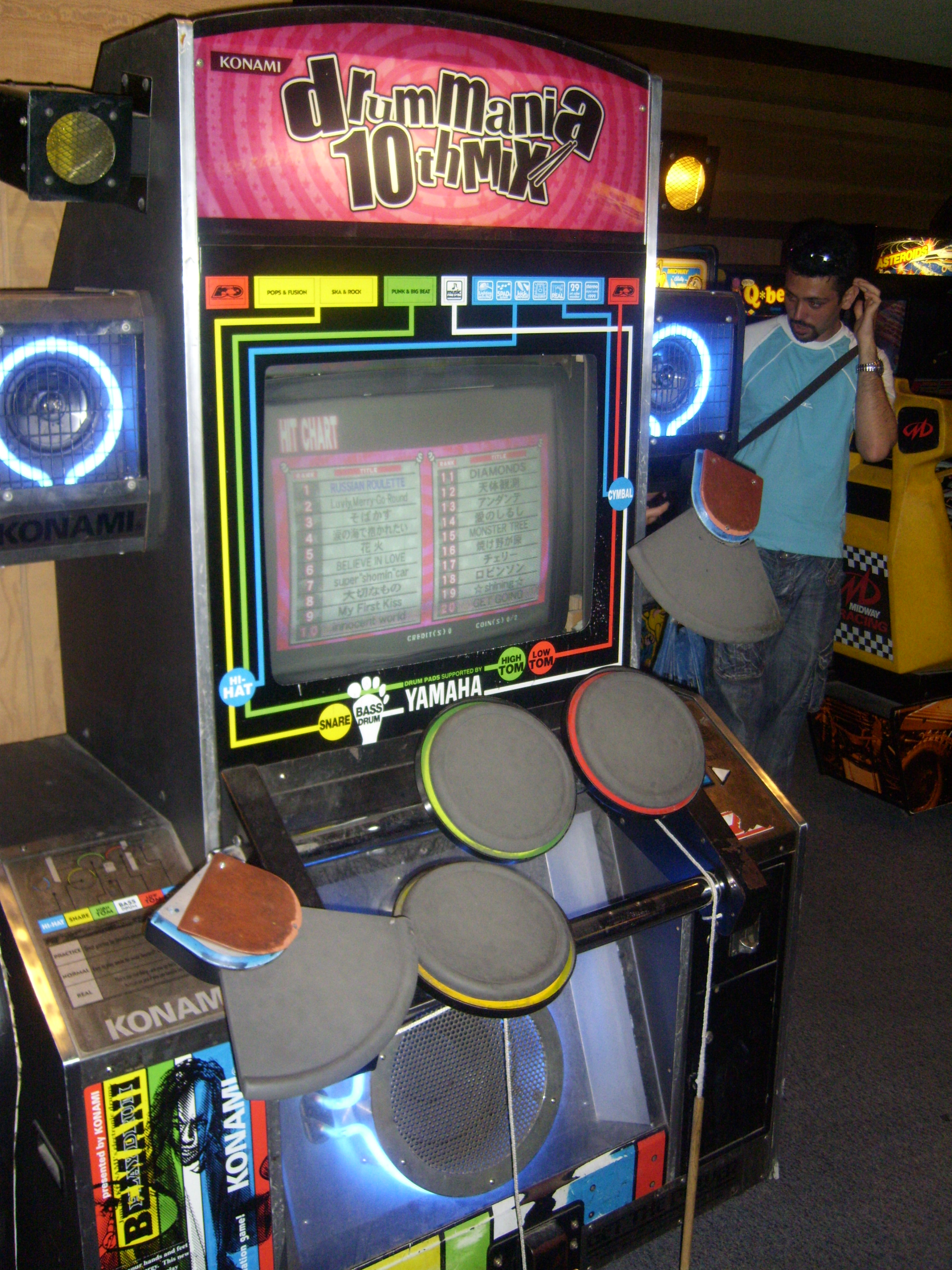
DrumMania 10th mix arcade machine

GuitarFreaks was released on February 16, 1999. It included a dozen of songs and uses the Bemani System 573 analog hardware, so called because it uses the analog audio output from a CD drive. DrumMania was released on July 10, 1999, along with GuitarFreaks 2ndMix. These versions included 26 and 33 songs, respectively, and could be linked together to play 14 common songs. Subsequent versions used digital hardware and featured larger song lists, eventually surpassing 120 songs. The GuitarFreaks version number continued having an increment of one compared to the equivalent DrumMania version until GuitarFreaks 11thMix and DrumMania 10thMix on April 22, 2004. GuitarFreaks 2ndMix was the last System 573 analog game, and DrumMania was the first System 573 digital game.

Although the series saw 11 main arcade releases for the System 573, only the first four received home ports. Two of these are GuitarFreaks games for the original PlayStation console:

- GuitarFreaks was released on July 29, 1999. It features a total of 18 songs: 12 from its arcade counterpart, 3 previews from 2ndMix and 3 unique songs. It features Key Disc technology to allow play of GuitarFreaks Append 2ndMix.
- GuitarFreaks Append 2ndMix was released on February 24, 2000. It features a total of 45 songs: 17 from its predecessor (J-STAFF is omitted), 17 from its arcade counterpart and 11 original songs. As an Append Disc, 2ndMix functions like an expansion pack, requiring the first GuitarFreaks to be loaded as a Key Disc before play.

DrumMania home ports are exclusive to the PlayStation 2. The first is simply DrumMania, the drum counterpart to GuitarFreaks 2ndMix. The game's two immediate sequels were also released as GuitarFreaks & DrumMania:

- DrumMania was released on March 4, 2000, as a launch title for the PlayStation 2.
- GuitarFreaks 3rdMix & DrumMania 2ndMix was released on September 13, 2000.
- GuitarFreaks 4thMix & DrumMania 3rdMix was released on September 20, 2001.

No home ports were released for the seven other System 573 sequels. Instead, songs from these arcade games are included in future titles for the PlayStation 2: the Masterpiece series, with a total of 150 songs split between two releases, and home ports of the V series, with 46 revivals split between three releases and unavailable in Masterpiece.

=== V1 to V3 (2005–2007) ===
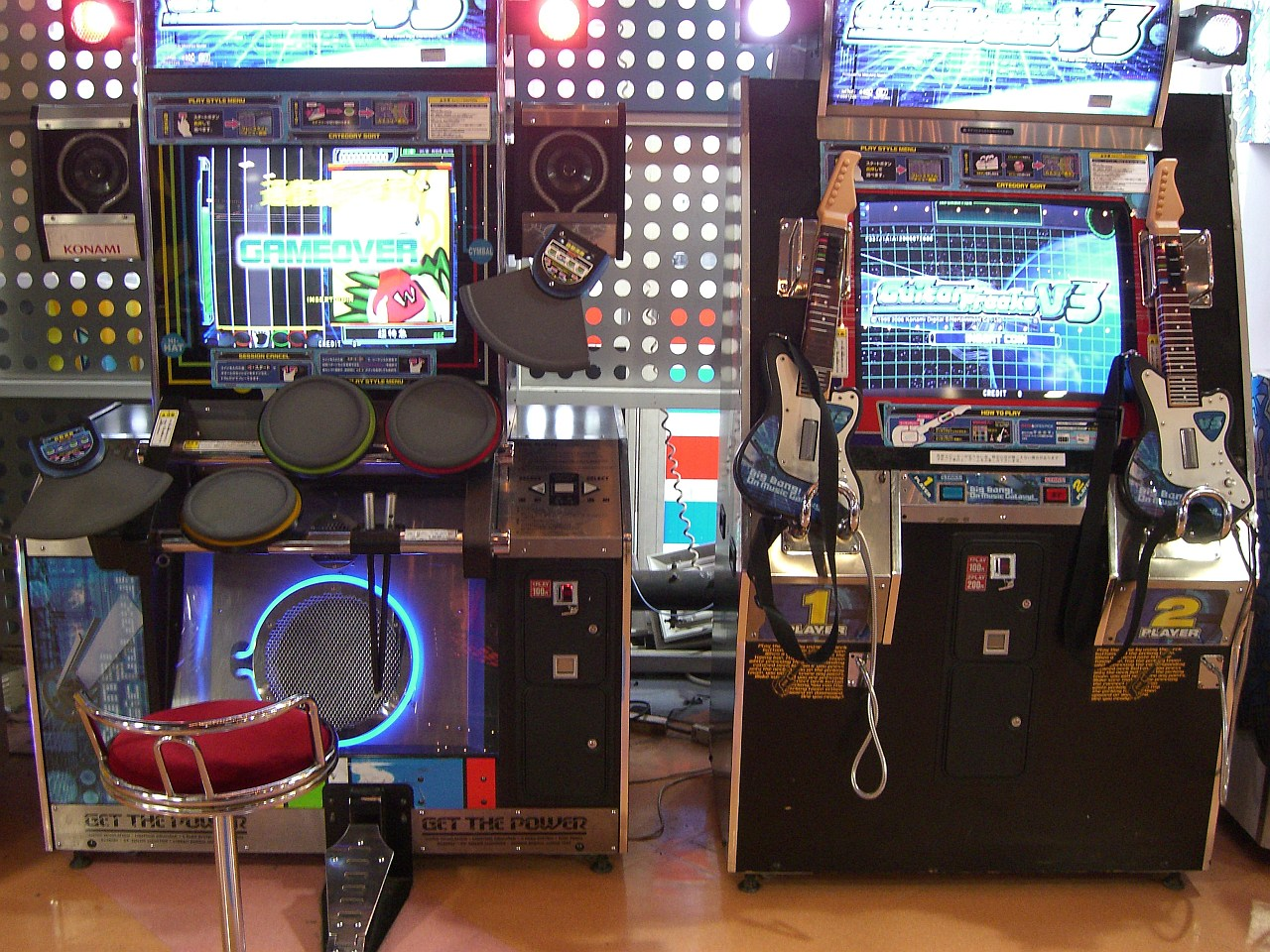
DrumMania V3 (left) and GuitarMania V3 (right)

In 2005, the GuitarFreaks & DrumMania series was upgraded to Bemani Python 2 hardware, which is powered by the PlayStation 2, the same hardware that later became used in the Dance Dance Revolution SuperNova series. This eased the development of home ports, which saw a reduced song list, but functioned nearly identically to their arcade counterparts. Three versions of the guitar and drum games utilized this platform:

- GuitarFreaks & DrumMania V was released on February 23, 2005, for arcades and March 16, 2006, for the PlayStation 2. The arcade version features 271 songs: 118 new additions, 125 from the previous version (« super "shomin" car » was removed) and 28 from older versions. The home version of V is limited to 68 songs, of which 49 are from the arcade version ("Misirlou" is missing), 16 are revivals from GF5/DM4 to GF11/DM10 (excluding GF6/DM5) and three are V2 previews.
- GuitarFreaks & DrumMania V2 was released on November 24, 2005, for arcades and November 22, 2006 for the PlayStation 2. The arcade version features 363 songs: 93 new additions, 270 from V ("Mountain à Go-Go" was removed) and 25 from older versions. The home version of V2 is limited to 67 songs, of which 44 are from the arcade version, 18 are revivals (seven of these revivals are also in V), three are V3 previews and another two are unique songs later featured in V4.
- GuitarFreaks & DrumMania V3 was released on September 13, 2006, for arcades and October 4, 2007 for the PlayStation 2. The arcade version features 417 songs: 46 new additions, 357 from V2 (six songs were removed) and 14 from older versions. The home version of V3 is limited to 80 songs, of which 46 are from the arcade version, 21 are revivals, 12 are console originals (including "You ~Meaning All Orbit~", later featured in V6, plus three V5 previews and six V4 previews) and one ("Misirlou") is from V.

Two other home versions of GuitarFreaks & DrumMania were released: Masterpiece Silver on August 31, 2006 and Masterpiece Gold on March 8, 2007. Each features 74 and 76 songs, respectively, from older releases that lacked a home port.

=== V4 to V6 (2007–2009) ===
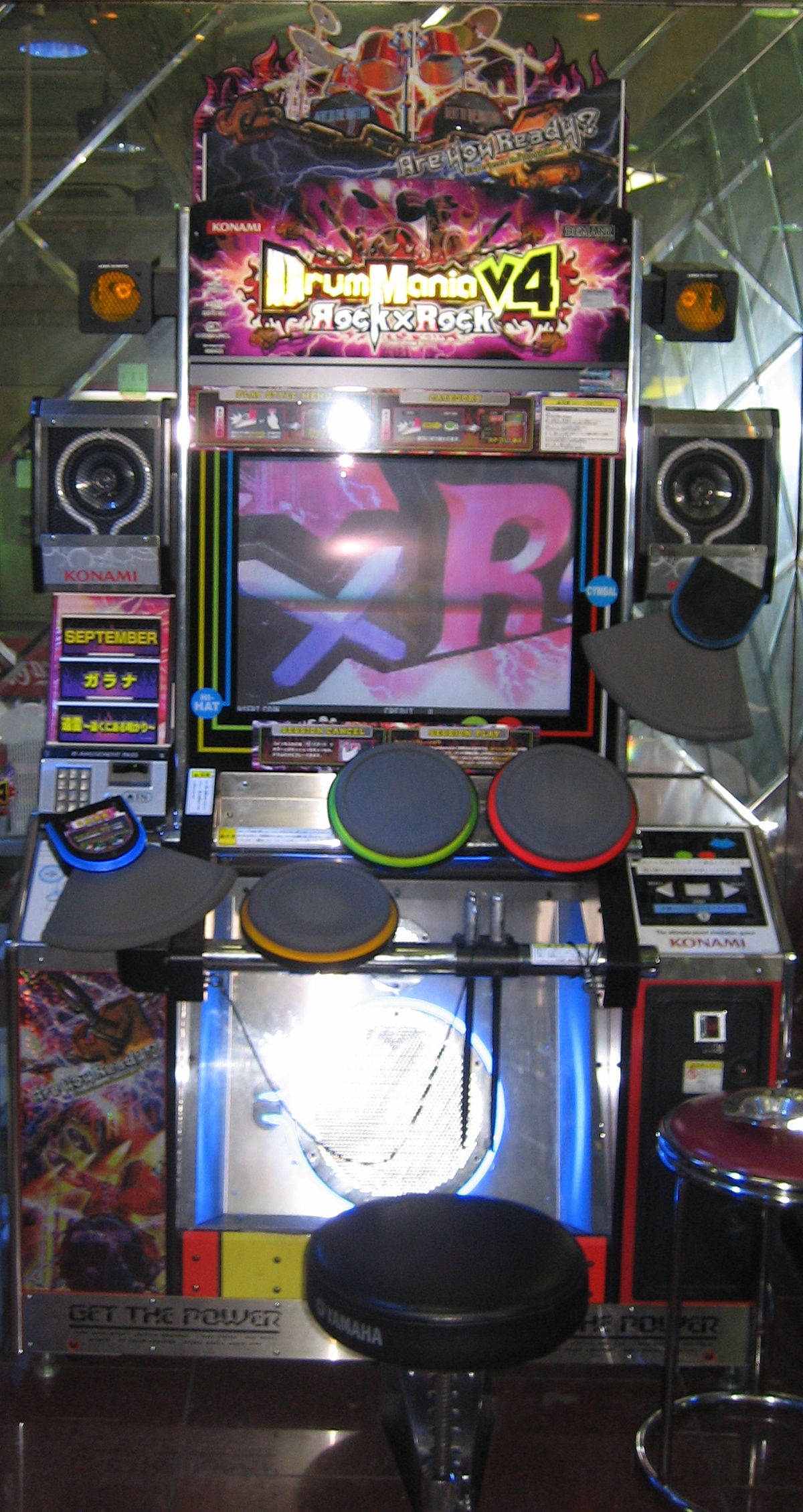
DrumMania V4

GuitarFreaks & DrumMania V4 was released on August 8, 2007, in Japan and received a location test on September 30, 2007, in the United States. This instalment is the first in the series to forego PlayStation-based hardware, replacing it with a Bemani PC running Windows XP Embedded. This is in contrast to Dance Dance Revolution SuperNova 2, which was released on August 22, 2007, in Japan and continued to use the PlayStation 2-based Python 2.

V4 is also the first international release in the series, the second location test of GuitarFreaks in the US, and the first location test of DrumMania in the US. The test was short-lived in the United States, concluding in just over a month.

=== XG to XG3 and V7 to V8 (2010–2012) ===
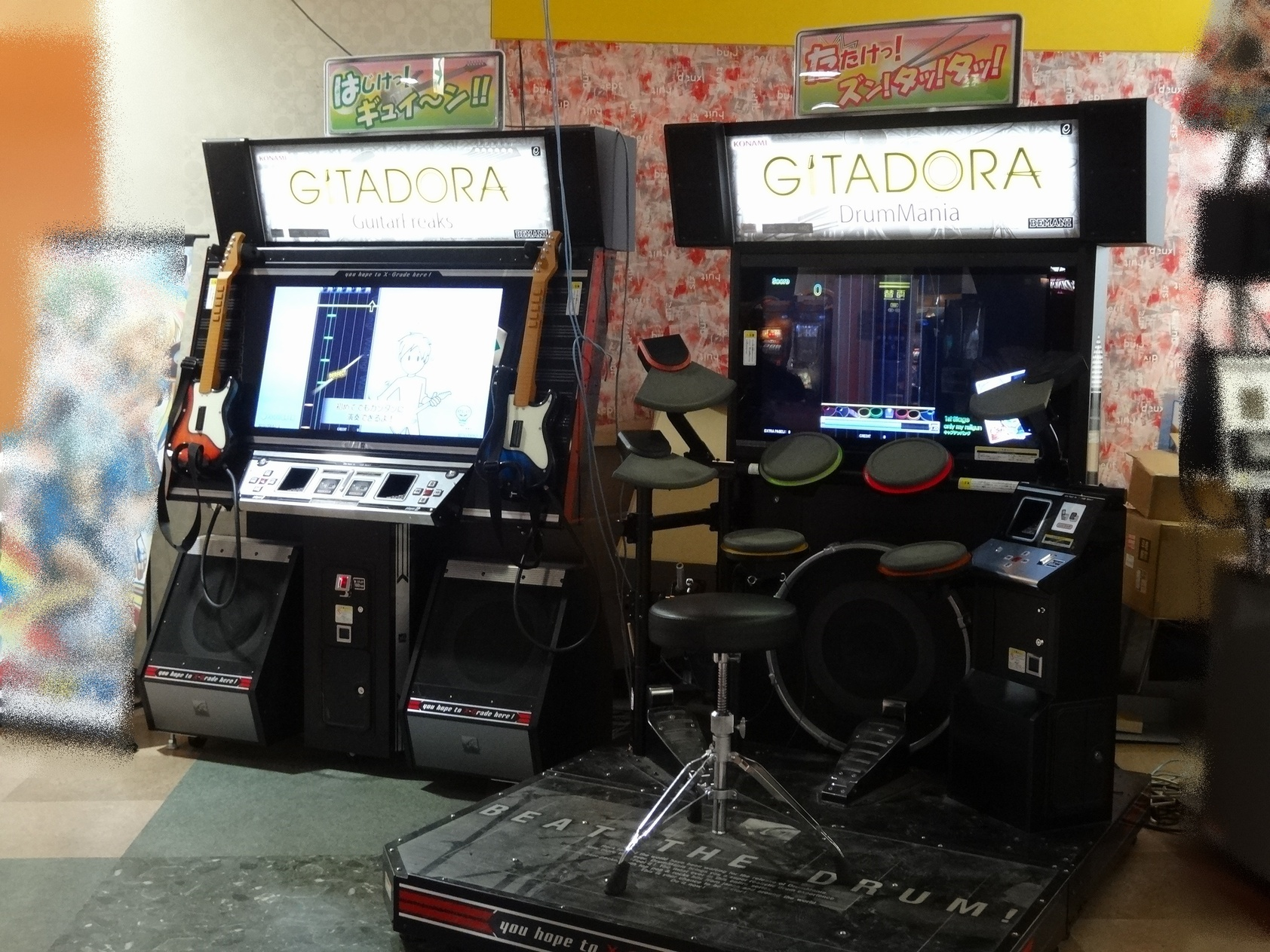
Gitadora XG2 GuitarFreaks (left) and DrumMania (right) cabinets

The XG series features guitar and drum controllers with extra frets and pads, respectively. V7 and V8 were released concurrently with XG and XG2, respectively.

=== GITADORA to GITADORA GALAXY WAVE DELTA (2013–present) ===
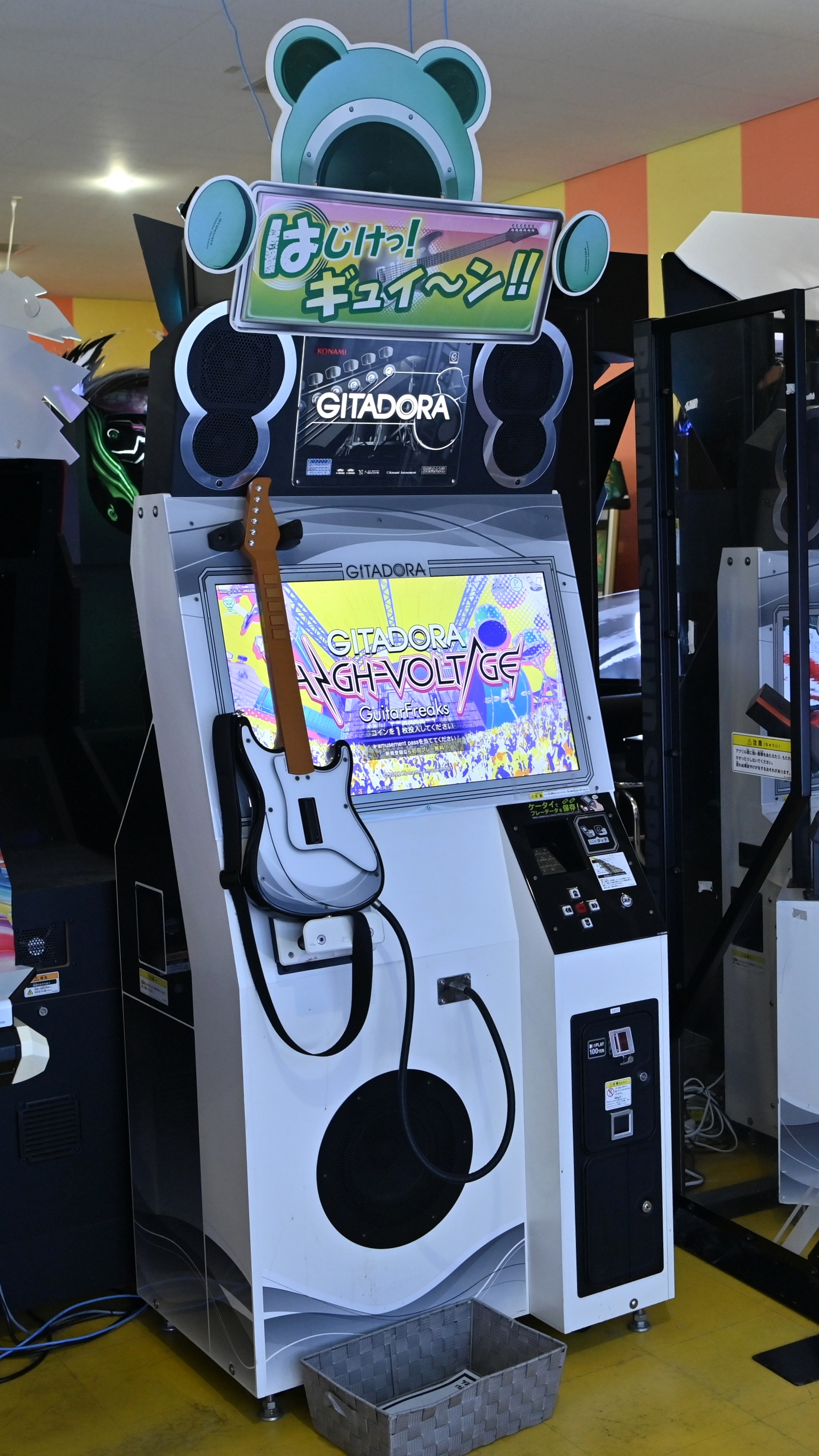
GITADORA HIGH-VOLTAGE GuitarFreaks machine

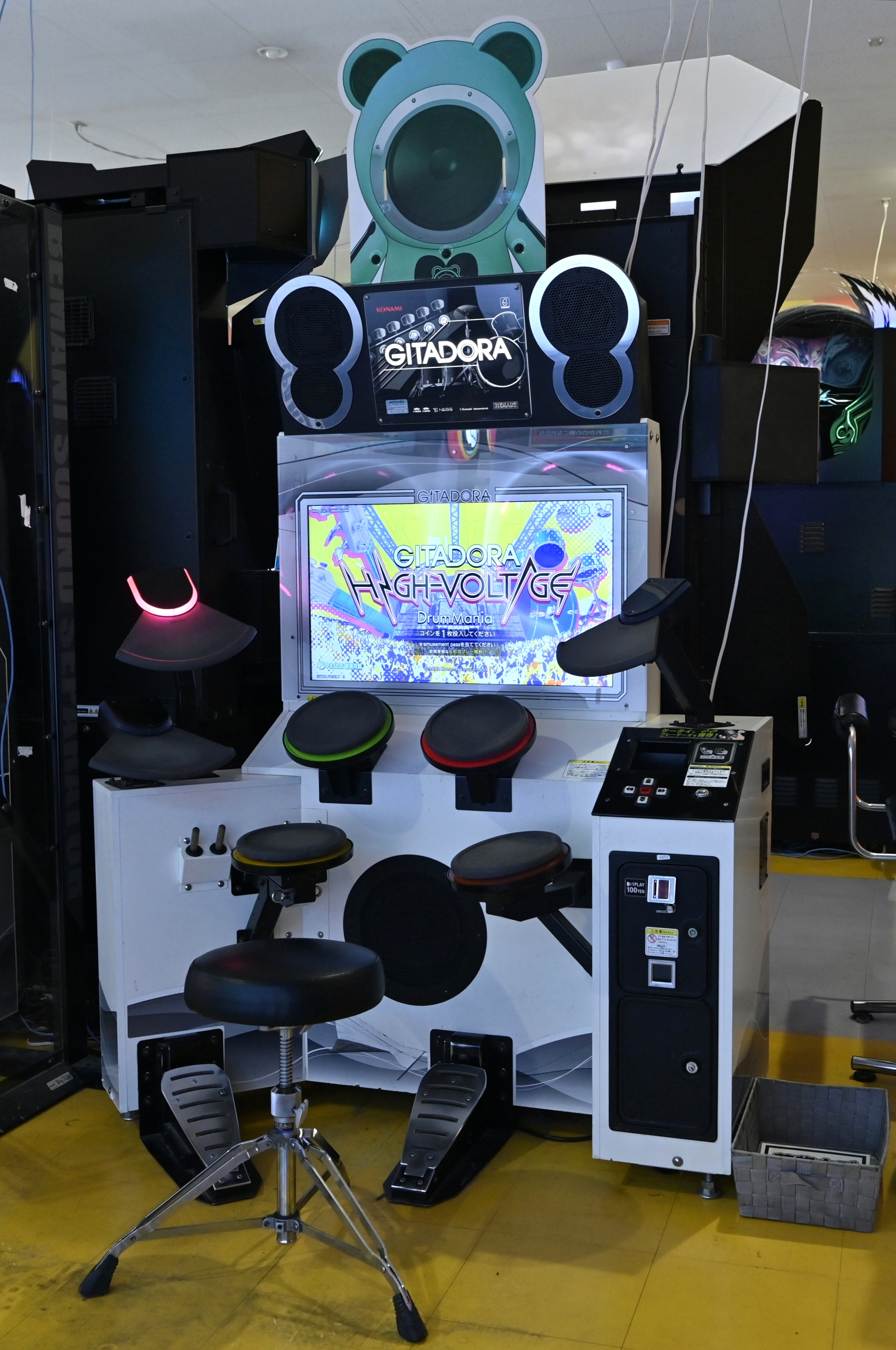
GITADORA HIGH-VOLTAGE DrumMania machine

GITADORA is continuation from the XG Series of GuitarFreaks and DrumMania. The first release of the GITADORA series was February 14, 2013, with lots of modifications to the game-play. The "Matixx" series of GITADORA made a lot of improvements (for example, Phrase Combo has been added to the Song Progress), similar to the following GITADORA series. By December 16, 2020, Konami announced the availability of a PC version of the game called "コナステ GITADORA" (Konasute GITADORA), for a monthly fee of 1480 yen. From February 1, 2021, to February 28, 2022, Konami held a promo offering a free month of the PC version with redemption codes included with the purchase of a Yamaha DTX 402KS or 452KS drumset. GITADORA GALAXY WAVE DELTA is the latest arcade release.

== Controller ==
GuitarFreaks is played using a controller designed to imitate the shape of an electric guitar, most like the Fender Jazzmaster or Fender Mustang. The neck houses three buttons, colored red, green, and blue. During XG series up to recent GITADORA, two buttons were added such as yellow and pink. On the main face of the guitar, a pick lever is used to simulate the picking and strumming of an actual guitar. A small metal knob near the pick is used to alter the sound produced by the game, such as adding Chorus/Delay effects.

== Gameplay ==
The DrumMania gameplay screen. The left is the gameplay area, the right shows a video often related to the song.

The interface is similar to other games in the Bemani series. Two note scrolls—one for each player—are displayed at the left and right sides of the screen. Colorful animations for each song are displayed in the center of the screen. Each note scroll consists of four columns: one each for the red, green, and blue buttons, and a fourth column, known as the Wailing Bonus column. Individual notes and chords are represented by small colored bars that scroll upward in the columns. To play the correct note, the player must hold down the buttons corresponding to the colored bars, and move the fret lever when the bars reach the yellow fretting line. When a guitar icon is displayed in the Wailing Bonus column along with an associated note, the player can tilt the guitar upright while playing the note to receive bonus points.

The player's accuracy is judged for each note played. The current system uses the names Perfect, Great, Good, OK, and Miss to indicate a player's accuracy. Ratings of Miss will deplete the player's Groove Gauge, while Perfect, Great and Good ratings will replenish it. If the Groove Gauge is emptied completely, the player fails, and the game ends. Players are allowed to play anywhere from one to five songs depending on the game cabinet's configuration, with the ability to earn additional songs in certain versions of the game. Furthermore, if "fast/slow" (advanced judge) is enabled, then there will be additional indicator of judge (Just/Fast/Slow/Miss). Just Perfects are called "X-Perfect"s (rainbow color) while Fast/Slow Perfects are regular Perfects (yellow color).

Upon successful completion of a song, players are graded on their performance. When the game ends, the player's total score across all songs played is tabulated.

DrumMania simulates real life drumming. It is played using a controller designed to imitate a drum set. Five pads are arrayed from left to right for the hi-hat, snare drum, high tom, low tom, cymbal and bass drum. On XG series, a left cymbal, left pedal and a floor tom are added. During play, the player presses the pads and steps on the pedal in sync with the notes falling vertically from the top of the screen in time with the music.

DrumMania uses a modified Yamaha DTXPRESS electronic drumkit. This drumkit is used for players for gameplay and navigating through select screens. Navigating can also be done by pressing Select and Start button on the right side of the machine. On home releases, a drum controller made by KONAMI can be used, although rather than separating each buttons on their own pads, home controllers place the pads on a single place, more resembling a palette. PlayStation 2 DUALSHOCK Controllers may also be used.

== Session linking ==
One of the major selling points of GuitarFreaks is its ability to be linked to another of Konami's Bemani games, DrumMania. This allows up to three players to join together to play simultaneously in Session Mode. During a session, the music will play simultaneously from both games, and the players' guitar and drum sounds are relayed between the two games.

Because the second version of GuitarFreaks was released prior to the first version of DrumMania, GuitarFreaks is one "mix" number higher than the DrumMania version it links up to. For example, GUITARFREAKS 6thMIX is designed to be linked with DrumMania 5thMIX. The mix versions were synchronized with the release of GuitarFreaks V & DrumMania V eschewing the long-standing number system, and replacing what would have been the 12th and 11th mix, respectively.

=== Super Session ===
Seen only in two releases each of GuitarFreaks and DrumMania, Super Session allowed the games to be linked up with Keyboardmania 3rd Mix as well. In addition to having three players control the guitars and drums, two more could be added playing along on keyboards. However, when linked with Keyboardmania, only about a dozen songs are available to play. Keyboardmania 3rd Mix can be linked with GuitarFreaks 5th Mix and DrumMania 4th Mix, or GuitarFreaks 6th Mix and DrumMania 5th Mix.

== Soundtrack ==
The series' songlist has steadily grown with each release. As of Gitadora FUZZ UP, the latest version of Gitadora features over 1,200 songs in total. Most songs are either crossovers from other Bemani games, and Japanese pop and rock. Some mixes also contain covers of popular North American songs. Songs are primarily in-house original compositions, covers of popular Japanese or English songs or edited master tracks licensed from the artists. Most songs are pop and rock in style, although there are often a wide variety of musical genres available.

== Reception ==
The arcade game was popular and played in arcades throughout Asia.

The PlayStation port of DrumMania received a positive review from Dave Zdyrko of IGN in 2000. He said that, while the game lacks realism and that it was "nothing at all like playing real drums," it "provides for one of the most addictive and enjoyable videogame experiences since Tetris was first unearthed."

== Legacy and impact ==
It is considered one of the most influential video games of all time, for having laid the foundations for popular guitar-based rhythm games, such as the Guitar Hero series.

GuitarFreaks is believed to have inspired Namco's similar rhythm game Guitar Jam, released later in April 1999.

GuitarFreaks and DrumMania inspired the development of popular North American console game franchises Guitar Hero and Rock Band. The Huangs raised $1.75 million for the effort, despite being turned down by some investors who "thought [the idea] was too weird".

In 2008, Konami sued Rock Band developer Harmonix for allegedly violating three patents for its drum and guitar based music games. The lawsuit was eventually settled in 2010 and its claims dismissed.

Konami also partnered up with Activision for post-2007 Guitar Hero games to comply with Konami's drum and guitar games patents, and eventually in 2009, the two, along with Raw Thrills, released Guitar Hero Arcade in North America.

== Releases ==
Title	Platform	Region	Date released
GuitarFreaks	Arcade	Japan	February 16, 1999
GuitarFreaks	Arcade	North America	?
GuitarFreaks	PlayStation	Japan	July 29, 1999
GuitarFreaks 2ndMix	Arcade	Japan	July 10, 1999
GuitarFreaks 2ndMix	Arcade	North America	?
GuitarFreaks 2ndMix	PlayStation	Japan	February 24, 2000
DrumMania	Arcade	Japan	July 10, 1999
DrumMania	Arcade	North America	?
DrumMania	PlayStation 2	Japan	March 4, 2000
GuitarFreaks 3rdMix & DrumMania 2ndMix	Arcade	Japan	April 21, 2000
GuitarFreaks 3rdMix & DrumMania 2ndMix	PlayStation 2	Japan	December 7, 2000
GuitarFreaks 4thMix & DrumMania 3rdMix	Arcade	Japan	September 13, 2000
GuitarFreaks 4thMix & DrumMania 3rdMix	PlayStation 2	Japan	September 20, 2001
GuitarFreaks 5thMix & DrumMania 4thMix	Arcade	Japan	March 17, 2001
GuitarFreaks 6thMix & DrumMania 5thMix	Arcade	Japan	September 13, 2001
GuitarFreaks 7thMix & DrumMania 6thMix	Arcade	Japan	February 28, 2002
GuitarFreaks 8thMix & DrumMania 7thMix	Arcade	Japan	August 30, 2002
GuitarFreaks 8thMix & DrumMania 7thMix (Power-Up Version)	Arcade	Japan	November 29, 2002
GuitarFreaks 9thMix & DrumMania 8thMix	Arcade	Japan	April 2, 2003
GuitarFreaks 10thMix & DrumMania 9thMix	Arcade	Japan	October 8, 2003
GuitarFreaks 11thMix & DrumMania 10thMix	Arcade	Japan	April 22, 2004
GuitarFreaks & DrumMania V	Arcade	Japan	February 23, 2005
GuitarFreaks & DrumMania V	PlayStation 2	Japan	March 16, 2006
GuitarFreaks & DrumMania V2	Arcade	Japan	November 24, 2005
GuitarFreaks & DrumMania V2	PlayStation 2	Japan	November 22, 2006
GuitarFreaks & DrumMania Masterpiece Silver	PlayStation 2	Japan	August 31, 2006
GuitarFreaks & DrumMania V3	Arcade	Japan	September 13, 2006
GuitarFreaks & DrumMania V3	PlayStation 2	Japan	October 4, 2007
GuitarFreaks & DrumMania Masterpiece Gold	PlayStation 2	Japan	March 8, 2007
GuitarFreaks & DrumMania V4 RockxRock (Note: GuitarFreaks & DrumMania V4 RockxRock in the United States was only available as a location test from September 30, 2007 to early November 2007. Afterwards, the games were withdrawn and no longer available for play.)	Arcade	Japan	August 8, 2007
GuitarFreaks & DrumMania V4 RockxRock	Arcade	Asia	2007
GuitarFreaks & DrumMania V4 RockxRock	Arcade	United States	September 30, 2007
GuitarFreaks & DrumMania V5 Rock to Infinity	Arcade	Japan	June 18, 2008
GuitarFreaks & DrumMania V5 Rock to Infinity	Arcade	Asia	2008
GuitarFreaks & DrumMania V6 Blazing! (Note: In South Korea, DrumMania V6 is titled DrumMania V6 Burning!)	Arcade	Japan	April 9, 2009
GuitarFreaks & DrumMania XG	Arcade	Japan	March 10, 2010
GuitarFreaks & DrumMania V7	Arcade	Japan	March 25, 2010
GuitarFreaks & DrumMania XG2 : Groove to Live	Arcade	Japan	March 9, 2011
GuitarFreaks & DrumMania V8	Arcade	Japan	March 28, 2011
GuitarFreaks & DrumMania XG3	Arcade	Japan	February 23, 2012
Gitadora	Arcade	Japan	February 14, 2013
Gitadora OverDrive	Arcade	Japan	March 5, 2014
Gitadora Tri-Boost	Arcade	Japan	April 21, 2015
Gitadora Tri-Boost Re:Evolve	Arcade	Japan	December 14, 2016
Gitadora Matixx	Arcade	Japan	September 6, 2017
Gitadora Exchain	Arcade	Japan	September 12, 2018
Gitadora Nex+Age	Arcade	Asia	October 2, 2019
Konasute Gitadora	Computer Game	Asia	December 16, 2020
Gitadora High-Voltage	Arcade	Asia	April 21, 2021
Gitadora Fuzz-Up	Arcade	Asia	December 14, 2022
Gitadora Galaxy Wave	Arcade	Asia	March 13, 2024
Gitadora Galaxy Wave Delta	Arcade	Asia	March 17, 2025

In Asia, outside of Japan, DrumMania releases from 1st to 10thMix are known as PercussionFreaks.

The PlayStation 2 port of GuitarFreaks 4thMix & DrumMania 3rdMix is known as ギタドラ! GuitarFreaks 4thMix & DrumMania 3rdMix. It is the first game with Gitadora in the title.

== Gallery ==
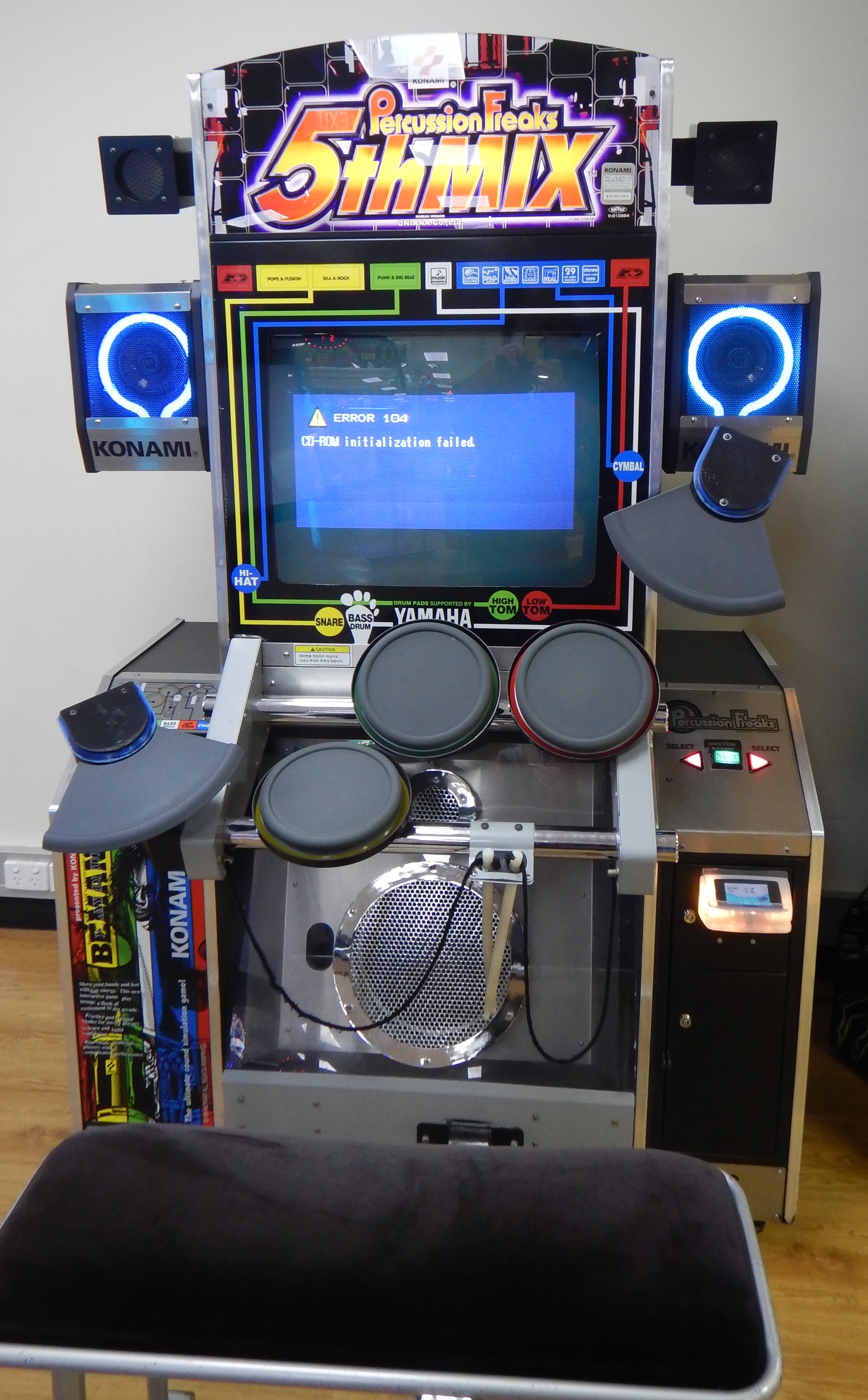
PercussionFreaks 5th Mix (DrumMania 5th Mix) arcade machine

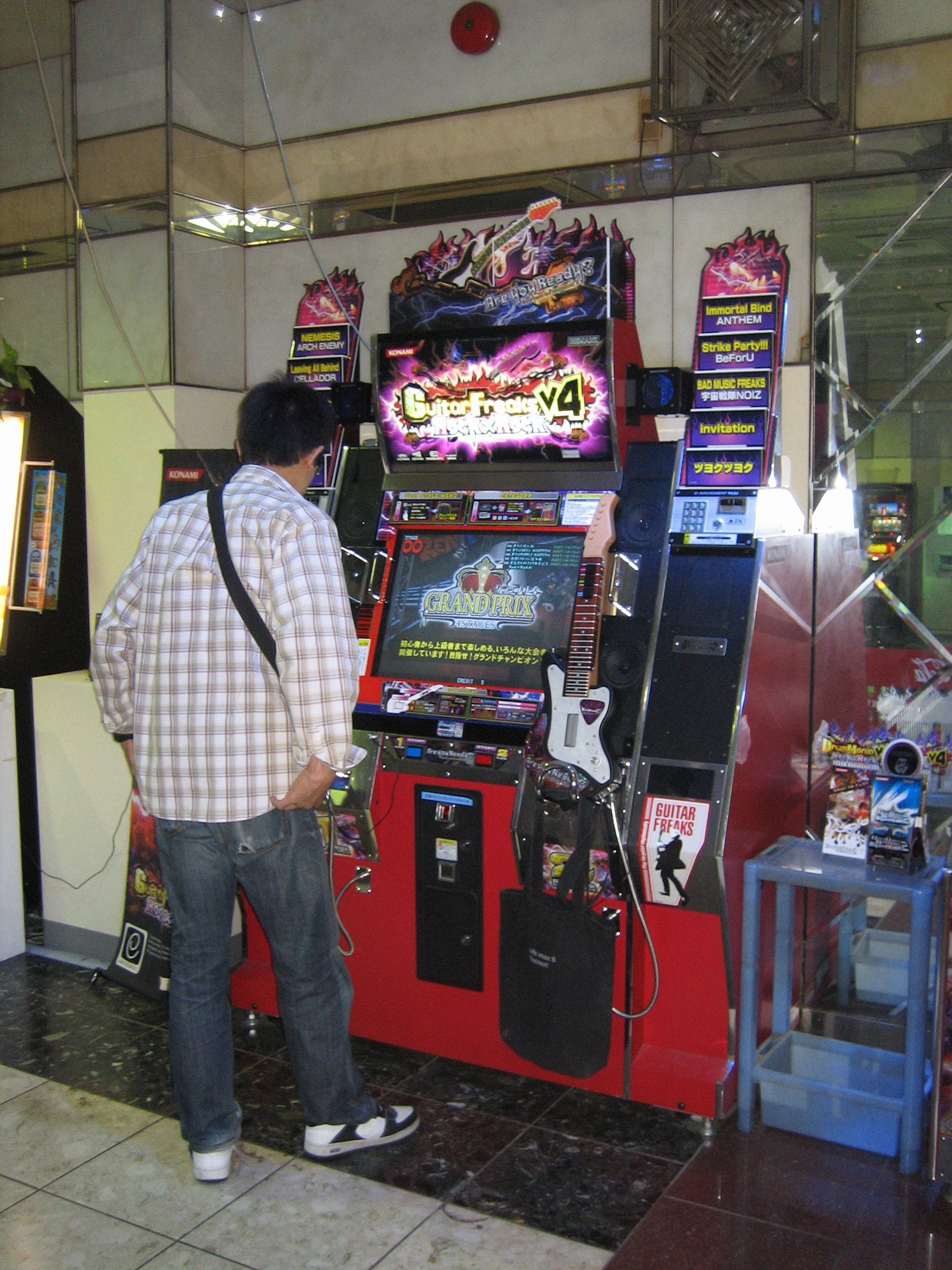
Guitarfreaks V4 cabinet

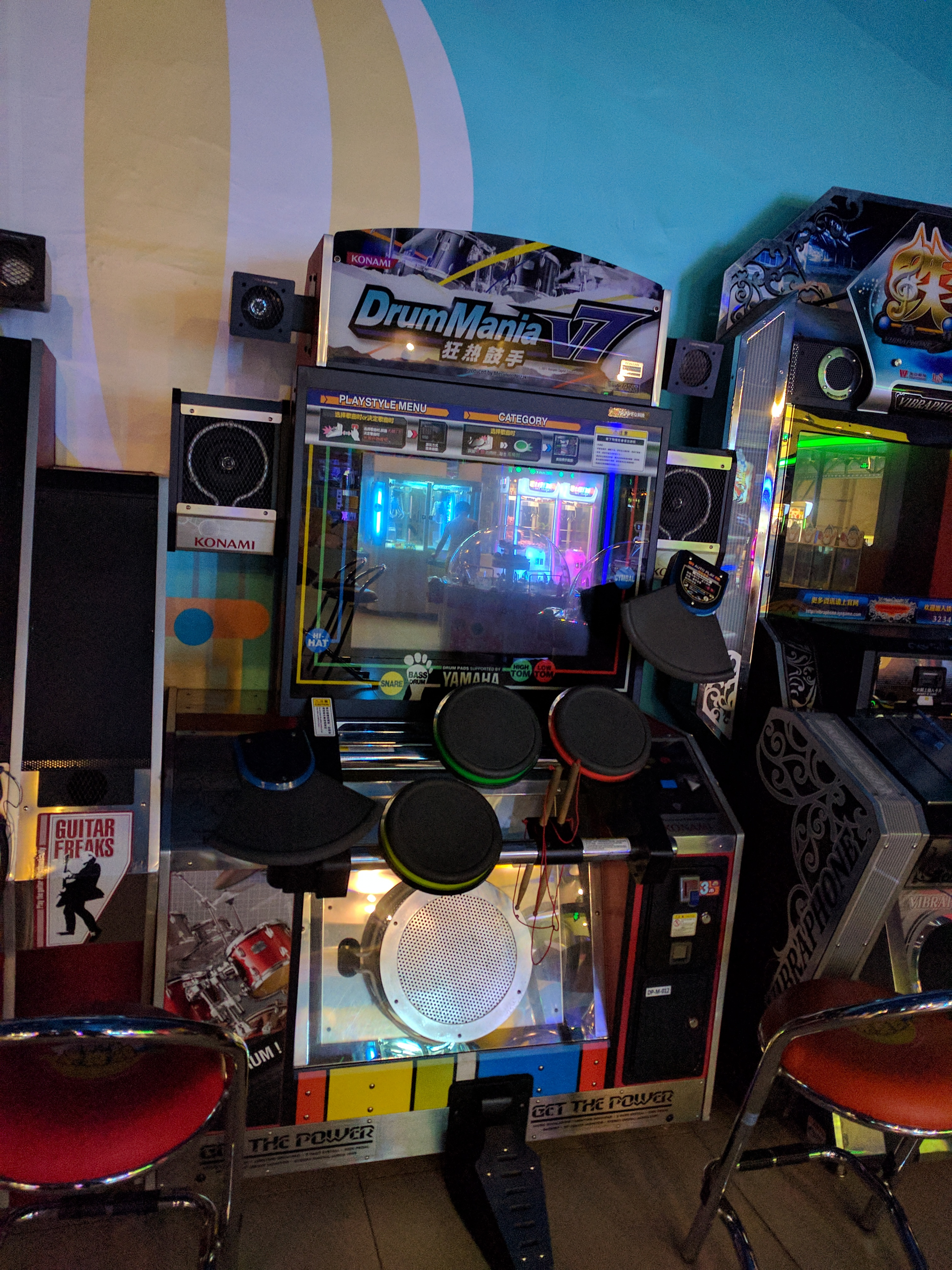
DrumMania V7 cabinet

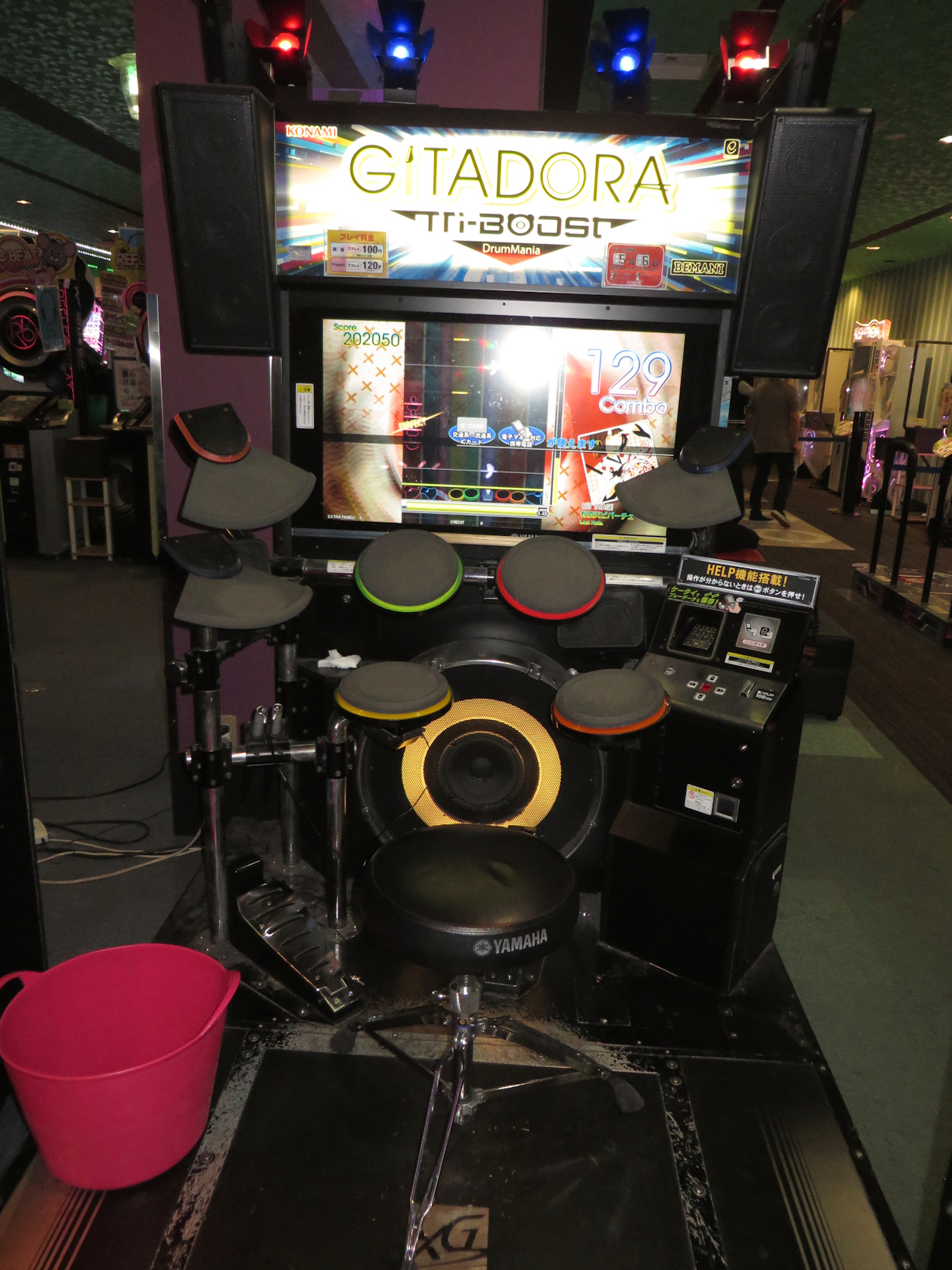
GITADORA Tri-Boost DrumMania arcade machine

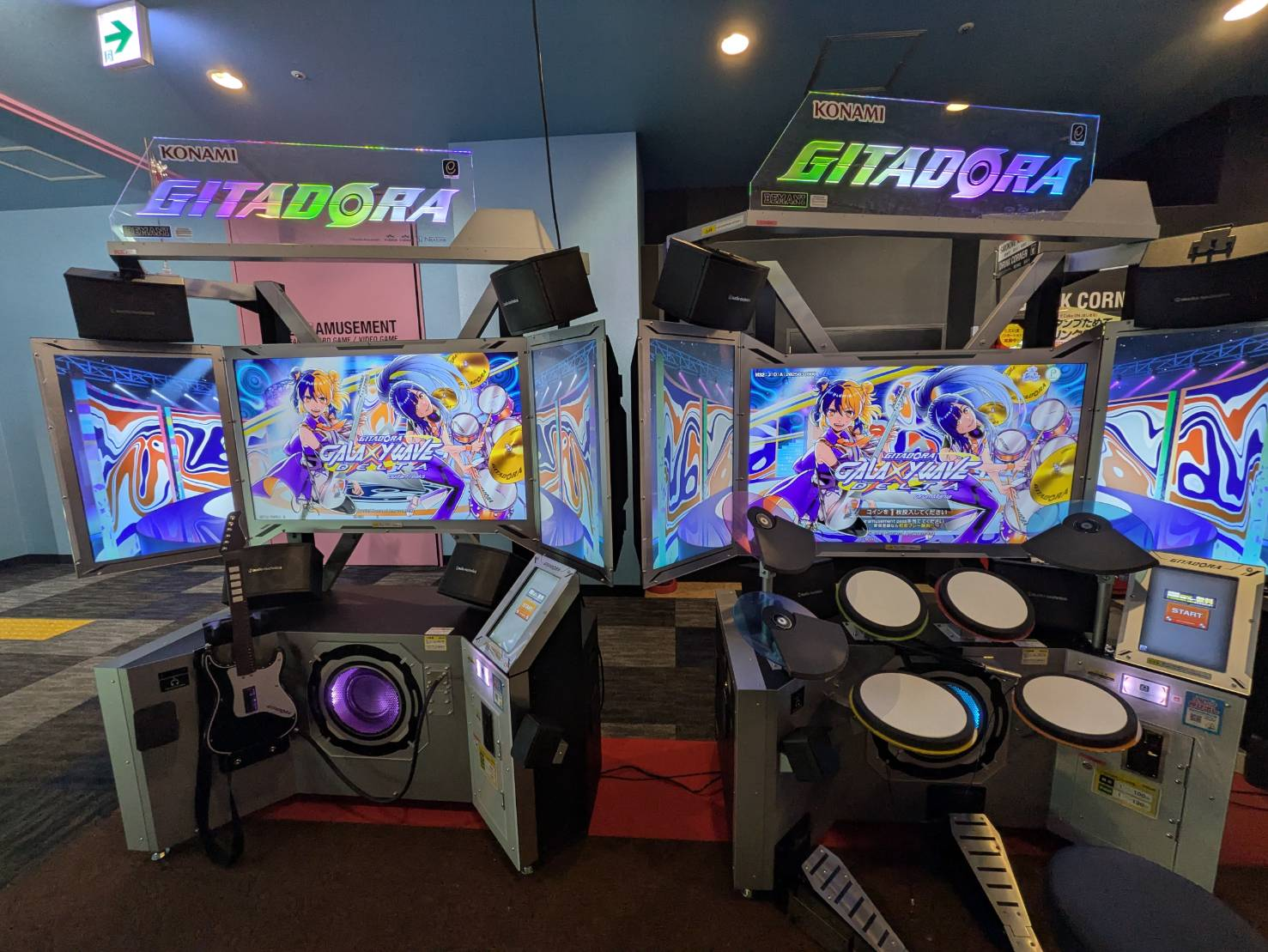
GITADORA -ARENA MODEL-

== See also ==
- Guitar Hero
- Rock Band
