= Abrázame muy fuerte =

Abrázame muy fuerte may refer to:

- Abrázame Muy Fuerte (album), a 2000 album by Juan Gabriel
  - "Abrázame Muy Fuerte" (song), the album's title track
- Abrázame muy fuerte (TV series), 2000 telenovela
