= Yasuhiro Abe =

Japanese musician

Yasuhiro Abe (安部 恭弘, Abe Yasuhiro) is a male Japanese popular music artist and composer. He made his debut on 1 November 1982 with the single We Got It!.

== Discography ==
=== Singles ===
- "We Got It!" (1 November 1982)
- "CAFE FLAMINGO" (1 February 1983)
- "JULIET" (1 July 1983)
- "TIGHT UP" (1 February 1984)
- "RAINY DAY GIRL" (21 June 1984)
- "DOUBLE IMAGINATION" (21 September 1984)
- "KISS MARK" (20 April 1985)
- "CLOSE YOUR EYES" (28 September 1985)
- "Tenesi Warutsu" (23 April 1986)
- "SHO-NEN" (29 September 1986)
- "Shuga Boi de Itekure" (6 April 1987)
- "Memories" (25 May 1988) ranked 92nd in Oricon singles charts
- "Midori" (27 July 1990)
- "China Rain in Christmas" (10 November 1990)
- "Calling You" (28 November 1991)
- "Kimi ni Furu Yuki" (25 January 1993)

=== Albums ===
- Hold Me Tight (1 March 1983) – Re-released by CD twice on 21 April 1984 and 25 May 1988
- Moderato (21 June 1984) – Re-released by CD on 25 May 1988
- Slit (19 January 1985) – Re-released by CD on 25 May 1988, and on 22 July 1992
- The Panorama Memory (20 July 1985) – Re-released by CD on 22 October 1985
- Frame of Mind (1 November 1985)
- Tune Box the Summer 1986 (2 July 1986) – Re-released by CD on 27 March 1996
- Invitation (20 December 1986)
- Urban Spirits (1 May 1987) – Re-released by CD on 27 March 1996
- Hold Me Tight – Moderato (25 November 1987)
- Summer Time in Blue (5 June 1988), ranked 30th on Oricon albums charts – Re-released by CD on 27 March 1996
- We Got It! (6 July 1988)
- Panorama Memory II (21 June 1989)
- Singles (13 March 1991)
- Tengoku ha Mattekureru (18 November 1991), ranked 73rd in Oricon albums charts
- Ballades (22 January 1992)
- Best Collection (26 August 1992)
- Dear. (25 January 1993) ranked 64th in Oricon albums charts
- Passage (21 October 1994)
- Gallery (5 October 1995)
- 4 New Comers (27 November 2002)
- Heaven Roses (5 March 2003)
- Chronicle (18 June 2003)
