= Tanzanian hip-hop =

Music genre

Tanzania Hip Hop Music
- Stylistic origins: American Hip Hop • Rap Music
- Cultural origins: 1980s Tanzania

Subgenres
- Bongo Flava • Tanzania Trap Music • Crunk Music

Regional scenes
- Dar-es-Salaam, Arusha, Mbeya, Mwanza, Dodoma

Tanzanian Hip-hop, which is sometimes referred to Bongo Flava by many outside of Tanzania's hip hop community, encompasses a large variety of different sounds, but it is particularly known for heavy synth riffs and an incorporation of Tanzanian pop.

There is some debate over whether Bongo Flava, which has emerged as a defined pop movement, can really still be qualified under the overarching term "hip hop" and not a movement unto itself, when it is beginning to develop a distinctive sound that differs from hardcore rap or, for example, the Maasai Hip hop of X Plastaz, who use the tradition of the Maasai tribe as the focal point for their sound and style. Tanzanian hip hop influenced the sound of the Bongo Flava genre. While Tanzanian hip hop retains many of the elements found in hip hop globally in terms of sound and lyricism, Bongo flava, derived from the Swahili word "ubongo" (meaning brains), incorporates hip hop, Indian filmi, taraab, muzik wa dansi, and dancehall beats. It all began in the 1980s when Tanzanian teenagers were really interested in the American hip hop scene. At first, they took American beats and rapped to them. As the youth rapped, the hip hop in Tanzania began to develop into a mix of traditional and localized hip hop scene. As a result, it began a wave of interest from other people in Eastern Africa.

== Bongo Flava ==
Etymology of the name "Bongo" of Bongo Flava comes from Kiswahili usually meaning brains, inelegance, cleverness but can also mean mentally deranged. Bongo is the augmentative form of Ubongo, Kiswahili for Brainland. Flava is kiswahili for Flavour. Ubongo is a term originally use, and in Tanzania still used, for the city of Dar es Salaam. Outside Tanzania, Ubongo is often referring to Tanzania. Ubongo as a term originated from a speech by President Nyerere in the late 70's during a very difficult time following both the global fuel shocks of the 70's and the Kagera war against Uganda. Mwalimu Nyerere spoke that only a nation using brains (using Kiswahili Ubongo for Brainland) could, and would, overcome the difficult challenges Tanzania was facing. Unfortunately things became even worse for Tanzania, and by the early 1980s Dar es Salaam was calling itself mostly by the name Jua Kali (hot sun/world is spinning/dizzy) but also Ubongo. The term Ubongo was being used as a clever way to say both, survival in Dar es Salaam required brains and inelegance, but was also full of mentally deranged people.

In 1981, musician Remmy Ongala founded a band called Matimila. Each band has a unique mtindo (style/fashion) and Remmy Ongala's band Matimila named their mtindo "Bongo". Remmy Ongala would become the most famous musician ever for Tanzania, reaching global fame working with English singer Peter Gabriel.

== Music style of Bongo Flava ==
There has been a lot of debate over whether Bongo Flava/Fleva is Tanzanian Hip Hop. While many scholars and journalists use Bongo Flava and Hip Hop interchangeably, distinctions are made by many Bongo Flava and Hip Hop artists.

Bongo flava borrows from Tanzanian hip hop, with fast rhythms and rhymes in Swahili. The name "Bongo Flava" comes from the Swahili word for brains: ubongo. Bongo is the nickname of Dar es Salaam. It means that you need brains to survive there. It has evolved over time, combining elements of American rap, R&B, hip hop, with its unique Swahili twist. As much as American culture, the lyrics within Tanzania hip-hop and the culture are politicized, about HIV, poverty, and corruption, or about life, relationships, money, jealously, and love.

Bongo Flava is a mixture of Afrobeat and arabesque melodies, dancehall and hip-hop beats, and Swahili lyrics. It developed in the 1980s when Tanzanian youth started rapping because they were fascinated by the hip-hop scene in the United States. They fairly quickly added their own spin and flavor to the music by localizing it with beats, rhythms, and topics. The genre has become popular very quickly; it is the best-selling musical genre in East Africa, is already a success in neighboring Kenya and Uganda, and is sweeping the African continent and spreading to the rest of the world. In 2004, German record label Out Here Records released the compilation CD, Bongo Flava - Swahili Rap from Tanzania. The 70 minute record which features artists including X Plastaz, Juma Nature, and Gangwe Mobb has enjoyed wide international distribution.

When American hip hop first migrated to Tanzania, local rappers would sample popular American rap beats, simply inserting Swahili rhymes in place of English. This infant Bongo Flava style and imported American hip hop was initially embraced almost exclusively by young upper class individuals who found it fashionable to follow US trends. This was often viewed as Tanzanians simply appropriating American culture and style, relating this to the idea of Americanization. In the early 1990s, as the genre was developing, the 'Kiswacentric' concept was born. Artists began to "localize" the music by addressing purely Tanzanian issues and eventually using the Swahili language, which in itself is a language with many global influences. Additionally, beats shifted from American hip hop sampling to organic synthesized beats often incorporating local beats, rhythm, and sounds. Tanzanian artists ensured that even when rapping in English, they would maintain the Swahili meanings behind their rhymes. By rapping in Swahili they were able to make the hip-hop style their own, while still "keeping it real" by the standards of American Hip-Hop. This Kiswacentric rap has continued the Swahili poetic tradition of using wordplay, puns, and rhyme to express oneself. Many artists strive to use Swahili ideas and culture in their songs and styles rather than reproducing American pop culture or gangsta rap.

The choice of language played an important role in the development and local acceptance of bongo flava. Through rapping in Swahili, many new artists were able to localize hip hop, giving it "a politically charged cultural image" and providing a way to relate it with Tanzanian culture. Tanzanian rapper Dolasoul (Ahmed Dola), who studied in Nigeria and the United Kingdom, notes that rap music, particularly in Swahili, provided him "with the means to represent his people and speak about changes that can be made for ‘a better tomorrow.’" He also notes that albums produced in Swahili, with minimal English, helps to make his language more accepted internationally. The use of Swahili language in bongo flava conveys a particular message and idea to its listeners, instilling a sense of national pride and common culture. Dolasoul mentions that with his use of Swahili and minimal English, he is attempting to "give a wake up call to my people."

At the same time, the employment of Swahili Rap represents an attempt to negotiate the authentic gangster projection with more traditional and local Tanzanian musical forms. Between the prominent mainstream US hip hop image of gangster rappers and increased radio and television airplay for groups from South Africa, Europe and the Congo region who project that image, Tanzanian rappers are heavily swayed toward a more raw style. While this borrowing of the authentic gangster image as represented outside of Tanzania can be interpreted as an appropriation for localizing purposes, it can also be viewed as mimicry. Since authentic gangster rap is commercially viable, Tanzanian artists are torn between the possibilities it presents and the negative attention it may gain them. Indeed, those who do imitate Western gangster rap are often isolated and derided for being gangster wannabes. Thus, the use of the Swahili language in Tanzanian rap helps take ideas from a larger hip hop discourse and incorporate them into the local context of that African rap culture. It makes sense then that those most dependent on the more marketable hardcore rap generally come from the impoverished regions of Tanzania, like Dar Es Salaam, where any chance at success may be more important than the worry of abandoning national pride in exuding a culturally ambivalent image. One of the paramount rap topics in this issue of balance is the objectification of women, which while it may be more marketable than less explicit forms, stands in contention with the Islamic ideals that many Tanzanians embrace. Still though, crude styles tend to appeal to the urban youth of Tanzania, as exemplified by the rap group LWP Majitu who, according to Out Here Records, "are popular for their hardcore hard hitting lyrics." Whether in the poorer parts of Tanzania or the more privileged, it is crucial for rap artists to maintain a healthy balance between the traditional and the original, the local and the global.

=== Emergence of hip-hop in Tanzania ===
Hip hop culture in Tanzania began in the early to mid 1980s chiefly as an underground movement, when promoters and artists would be forced to record and copy music in makeshift studios using rudimentary equipment. Underground rap began, not in the poorer working class areas of Dar es Salaam, but in the slightly more affluent areas of the city, where there was access to the Western world through friends, family, and travel opportunities. Oddly enough, rap first caught on amongst the youth of Tanzania's 'middle class.' These were teens with some formal education, a familiarity with English and a connection in another country who could mail the music to them. Hip hop provided the perfect outlet for Tanzanian youth to voice their anger and dissatisfaction with society. These students of hip hop played an integral part in the formation of bongo flava, "through participation within a transcultural, multilingual and multiracial global hip-hop nation, combining African-American language with Swahili and local street varieties ("Kihuni")". In the 1990s, Tanzanian hip hop shifted from an underground phenomenon to commercially accepted model, and became accessible to working class youth as well.

Early Tanzanian rap tended to be in English, but as the genre developed some rappers began writing raps in Swahili. The main venue for their music was live performance, particularly the Yo Rap Bonanza competition. The YRB competition was organized by Indian merchants; notably, it attracted rappers from outside of [Dar es Salaam]. Artists such as Saleh J and Eazy-B performed at the competition.

African American music had always been influential in Tanzania, especially soul and R&B, but with the birth of a socialist government, foreign music was banned in Tanzania. For example a hip hop group from Tanzania, Berry White, exemplifies the influence of African American music solely in the name of the band. It seems as though they are imitating and/or mimicking the world renown Barry White. Moreover, before the socialist government in Tanzania banned foreign music, it was evident that Tanzanian hip hop was heavily influenced by western music, specifically African American music. This gave Tanzanian citizens limited access to hip-hop, and early artists either learned of it by hearing it in a foreign country through connections abroad. For young rappers like Dolasoul, or Balozi, (Ahmed Dola), "it was just for the fun, no money was involved." Rap music was merely a pastime for the upper and middle classes, in opposition to early hip-hop artists in the United States and South Africa. Education was seem as their way to gain financial and social success and early rappers mostly rapped in English using American lyrics and tracks. The scene began to change in the early 1990s with the breakdown of socialism, allowing hip-hop to become accessible to lower classes through the increase in circulation, and as it became acceptable for local artists and hip-hop fans began recording, copying and distributing hip-hop.

Africa taking notice of this genre of music is another huge advance for Tanzanian hip hop. In the history of Music in Tanzania, there had never been a male bongo flava artist nominated for Kora African music Awards. Yesaya Ambwene aka AY was the first one to be nominated. Ay was nominated in the category of the best male artist from Eastern and Central Africa in 2005. Including this genre in the African music awards reveals a lot of how far this music has come in such a short time.

Currently, hip-hop is not only a music of the elite, but is an important voice for the lower classes and those who are poor and underprivileged. Hip Hop is also the voice of the lower class because it allow them to express what their feelings are about any given situation on the country. Also because this is a way to upper ward mobility and a way to move from poverty to a better economical position. But in particular as Lemelle says "woven together into this scene and the lyrics are a sense of anger and alienation as well as clear desire to seek a better life-weather inside the country or without". (Hip Hip culture and the children of Arusha, Sydney J. Lamelle). In any case what the lower class in Tanzania use the hip hop as way to show the way in which poor people live in their country and at the same time try to gain some economical position. For example, artist Balozi recently worked on a project with poor Tanzanian boys affected by the HIV/AIDS epidemic, writing a song expressing their plight. The song, "Hali Duni" proceeded to move to the top of the musical charts in Dar es Salaam, and was featured in several movies.

According to journalist Henry Bukuru (a.k.a. Cxteno Allstar), rap music was by far the greatest influence of hip hop culture in Tanzania. Mponjika described the four rudiments of hip hop culture in Tanzania as: break dancing (b-boying), graffiti art, DJing, and rapping. DJ competitions represented the birth of hip hop, particularly in Zanzibar, which had television to broadcast these competitions that took place live in informal public spaces (school graduations, picnics, house parties).

So many artists have emerged from Bongo Flava, and it is almost impossible to name all of them. The Tanzaninan "Dr.Dre" is certainly Mr. II that was the first Bongo Flava's superstar which has now retired. Mr. II is classified as a solo artist in Tanzania, but two groups took over the Bongo Flava industry namely the "TMK" and the "East Coast". The "Tmk" stands for Temeke which is one of the poorest neighbourhoods in Dar-es-Salaam. In that part of the city inhabits some of the most radical and critical crews such as Juma Nature or Gangwe Mobb. The "East Coast" is where rappers from middle or upper class society in a much nicer part of town Upanga, these rappers are known to rap more about the happy sides of life and their music is often compared to commercial music. Juma Nature raps about his country and the sense of unity that he exemplifies. His music is easy flowing and is accompanied by synthesised drum with instrumentation. Juma Nature uses a story telling aspect to his rapping.

== Imitation to original formation ==
Tanzania, an African country, has a history of European colonization. There has been a long-standing debate in regarding the implicit dynamics of power when a colonized or oppressed culture adopting certain cultural forms (music styles, fashion, etc.) of the colonizers or the oppressors. Is hip-hop in Tanzania mimicry and imitation of American hip-hop, which would imply an American cultural hegemony? Or are artists borrowing some elements of American hip-hop that resonate with them, among a variety of other (for example Tanzanian, Congolese, Japanese, or Cuban) cultural influences and then creating something entirely new, entirely their own? Are these always mutually exclusive? Alex Perullo, writer and professor at Bryant College in Rhode Island, says this:

[Some say] all this music that is coming from the West such as hip-hop is destroying local cultures and local ideas, and local musical trends. And to some extent, there is a little bit of truth in that, although I would hesitate to say that cultural imperialism is actually happening...There are a lot of artists in Tanzania who do dress exactly like the people that they see from the United States. They wear the FUBU clothing, they wear the baggy pants, they wear the New York Yankees hats...But the problem with that is this is very early in the pop music....They sang in English, and sang about American issues. But now we have artists singing [in] Swahili, and they sing about Swahili issues, about Tanzanian issues, about issues that are very much identified with their country...So I think as far as Tanzanian identity is concerned, yes, there are certain things that they're going to keep borrowing from American culture or European culture, or other African cultures, but this doesn't mean that there's going to be assorted eradication of local trends...the main genres are still there. There not disappearing. There's room enough for all these genres to grow, and they each occupy different areas.

There seems to be a debate that is consistently repeated in every single country in which global hip hop is studied, what is truly authentic? Bongo Flava in Tanzania borrows elements from music all over the world, mainly cultural elements (i.e.- style, attitude) from the American hip hop scene. There is a sense that Tanzanian youth look up to the European styles which they apparently mimic. The music is produced using Swahili which makes it seem like the foreign hip hop cultures are the inputs to the output that is Bongo Flava, but this final "output" is different from the sum of its parts.

In an effort to appear authentic, much of Tanzanian hip-hop began imitating the American model of "gangsta" rap, romanticizing aggression and violence. However, as hip-hop evolved in Tanzania, it has slowly diverged from this precedent. Crime in Tanzania is seen as a result of economic need and is very much frowned upon, with wezi, or thieves, becoming instant targets for outcasting by the community or falling victim to "instant justice" on the streets. In fact, bongo flava originates from the Swahili word "ubongo" meaning brains, an implication that it takes brains to survive in Dar es Salaam. This interpretation of values conflicts the message sent out by American "gangsta" rap. Furthermore, the gangs in Dar es Salaam share few of the same characteristics of the large drug dealing gangs wreaking havoc in inner city America. In a region where Islam plays a strong role in the lives of the general populace, it is difficult to incorporate the vain outlook on life and the condescending attitude towards women so prevalent in commercially successful rap in America. Consequently, "gangsta" rap has not achieved widespread popularity in Tanzania, although "gangsta" rap will occasionally reveal itself in album sales or on the radio.

Tanzania hip-hop artists often struggle to distance themselves from the styles of American hip-hop, but are making a conscious effort to create their own style. Tanzanian hip hop group Jungle Crewz Posse scoffed at the notion that their songs were just like American music, saying "Rap is not copying from abroad...we are not talking gun. If you showed me a gun it would be hard for me to tell you which is the trigger. I know gun in movies, pictures. We are talking things that we know and see and understand. Tanzanian hip-hop music could have been associated with mimicry and copying from other cultures at one point, but as Bongo flava becomes more developed, its sound will become more and more authentic to Tanzania. Already with a second generation of hip-hop artists emerging new, uniquely African sounds have been used more, including "muziki wa dansi, taarab, and Indian filmi."

Due to the presence of multiple societies, Tanzania has a torn perspective of its own culture.

There are youth in Tanzania that are entranced with Western culture and modernization enough to want to "become like them" (the West). As most fail and even die to make this transition, bongo-flava songs, while still speaking out against heavy issues like HIV/AIDS, has recently been made to be "uplifting and memorable," in order to give Tanzanians hope and a positive outlook on life.

Through hip hop, Tanzanian youth combine the best of both worlds. They mimic United States and European styles of hip hop, while still allowing their own African heritage and culture to shine through. Using their native language, they often portray remnants of ancient rituals in the singing and videos. The imitation of already existing forms of hip hop combined with their own style allows Tanzanian hip hop to be truly unique.

=== Role in Tanzanian society ===
Tanzanian culture embraces President Julius K. Nyerere's 1967 "Arusha Declaration" in which called for "Ujamaa", or familyhood. Being a socialist nation at the time, this declaration called for the halt of corrupt politics and promised protection from the hands of global imperialists. Post-Socialism, when politicians abandoned the principles of Ujamaa, the growing underground Hip-Hop movement of the 1980s readopted it. Presently, Bongo Flava retains its political messages in spite of experiencing a rise in "gangsta" style rap during the 1990s. The Tanzanian culture seemingly refuses to accept violence and vulgarity in its music while romanticizing socialism.

Hip Hop is a force which shaped the project of how to construct the Tanzanian nation. Cultural policies such as national music policies were formed in order to produce a united culture for the Tanzanian nation. These types of policies allowed Swahili bands to emerge and a live entertainment scene to thrive. However, it was not until the 1980s that the birth of hip hop and rap music truly took place. As a result of politicians post Nyerere forgetting about ujamaa and the rise of unemployment and poverty, an avenue for artistic expression was created as an underground movement. While the establishment of hip hop in other countries such as South Africa and Brazil took place among lower classes of the population, hip hop in Tanzania was most common among middle and elite classes due to their access to the western world.

As in many African countries, hip hop has become a medium for post-colonial expression and the development of a youth voice. According to Sidney Lemelle, rap and hip hop have been "localized and indigenized to fit the political economic and social cultural realities of post-colonial/neo-colonial struggles, and both have served as avenues for artistic expression and political protest." Rap has become a way for youth in Tanzania to teach others about joblessness, corruption, class differences, AIDS and other problems that are faced within the Tanzanian society. It has formed a type of community for the youth to bind together building confidence and self-reliance rather than anger and violence which is the stereotype of how the rappers in the society are. It also provides validation that they are not the only ones facing these pressures every day. Pieter Remes found out in his research that regardless of where the music was produced whether locally or abroad, that the music was intertwined with the experience and expression of urban youth in many different dynamic ways.

It has also become a medium with roots in the oral tradition of some countries like Tanzania. This can be seen in street entertainment known as mchiriku which is very popular in Dar es Salaam. Mchiriku is a style of music that is very popular around the poor areas of Dar es Salaam, Coastal and Morogoro regions. Its repetitive, fast-paced rhythms are considered unsoothing by the wealthy people in Tanzania. Mchiriku is played with a small hand held keyboard, old tins beaten with sticks, drums and whistles. Mchiriku songs are known for biting social commentary.

Tanzanian hip hop has been seen to voice many positive messages. Music has served as an alternative to newspapers, radio, and other forms of news about social issues and conditions. Tanzanian rappers have been seen to work with government organizations and NGOs regarding social issues among youth such as AIDS awareness and drugs. Such NGOs have been founded to promote this type of education which has been coined 'Edutainment', which is the mixing of education with popular culture in order to transmit these messages to youth. Madunia is an organization based in the Netherlands which promotes African music and the local initiatives of African musicians. It also gives advice on the use of this music as a "medium of development".

Female rappers have had difficulty finding success in East Africa. The media in Tanzania was slow to accept female artists, "who might offer a gendered voice and a counter-narrative in the public sphere." Kenyan rapper Nazizi developed a large following in Tanzania and worked with Tanzanian producers P-Funk Majani and Mika Mwamba. Although she has been successful competing against male MCs, Nazizi insists that she "would really love to see more ladies jumping onto the rap bandwagon." The biggest difficulty facing female rappers is that they must overcome the assumption that MCing is a masculine activity and that hip hop is associated with gangs and violence.

Sidney J. Lemelle writes that if a song had explicit lyrics about women then it was hardly aired on Tanzanian television. The government plays a big role in there. With all these negative environmental factor on rappers, including the ones explained in the last paragraph, really put down the female artist to grow. That is why the author states that it is not surprising that "there are only a few female Kiswahili rappers in East Africa." A few of the popular Tanzanian female artists are Dataz, Lade Lou, Bad Gear, SJ and Aunt Su. According to Eric Toroka, Dataz second solo album's name was "Zali la moshi". "Florence Kasela, famous as Dataz is among few other hip hop female artists in Tanzania" are also joining the hip-hop movement in all over the country. Dataz states to her fellow "hip hop artists that they should not misinterpret hip-hop". She said, "A big difficulty is that people consider hip hop as hooliganism but they actually don't know what it is. I think they should sit down and listen to tracks like Chemsha bongo and more and then comment about it." Thus, it can be said that the wrong definition of hip-hop and government influence plays a big role in this situation.

=== Events and Organizations ===
There have been several organizations and events that emerged to provide platforms for Hip Hop culture in Tanzania. These include the (now defunct) Hip Hop Kilinge (Cypher), a weekly event that brought youth to the New Msasani Club in Dar es Salaam for performances, battles, and education sessions. In Arusha, the Hip Hop NGO Okoa Mtaa (Save the Streets) organizes regular Hip Hop festivals and workshops that focus on various Hip Hop elements, like lyricism and photography. Hip Hop artist Fid Q organized several Hip Hop initiatives, including the interview show FidStyle Fridays, the open mic event Poetry Addiction, and the Hip Hop Darasa (class) for aspiring artists. Lyricist Lounge, later renamed The Lounge, was started by Shamsa Suleiman and New York Native FetJen, and hosted monthly open mic nights for upcoming and established artists.

=== Bongo Flava and HIV/AIDS ===
Hip hop has been used as a major vehicle for awareness about HIV/AIDS. In her article, Sidney refers to Tanzanian rapper Dully Sykes and a song he released in 2001 called ‘Nyambizi’ (Swahili for voluptuous woman). The song lyrics talk about having unprotected sex, and many radio stations refused to play the song. The ubiquity of sexual themes in music has created a lot of controversy in Tanzania because it is estimated that 12-15% of the population is infected with HIV or AIDS. In response, many artists have begun using hip hop to bring awareness to the AIDS epidemic and to teach youth safe sexual practices. Ishi (the Swahili command to live) is the name of a government-sponsored organization that helps promote safe sex. "Our main theme – don't feel shy, talk with your partner about abstinence, being faithful or using a condom," says Nassoro Ally, a regional outreach coordinator for Ishi. Ally Adds that hip hop is a great way to reach youth who may not know how to read and write, but who do participate in the hip hop scene in Tanzania. With roots in the Maasai tradition, elements of hip hop, and the contributions of super star innovators like X Plastaz, hip hop is being used to transmit an important message across Tanzania and in other African countries as well.

== Bongo Records ==
Bongo records is owned by a very influential person in the Tanzanian hip-hop/Bongo Flava scene that is taking place in this part of Africa. Paul Matthysse who is also known as P-Funk Majani, is not only the owner of Bongo Records but also as talented producer, who has had a lot of input in the way the genre of music is shaped. He has been the winner of Kili Music Award in Tanzania as producer of the year 3 times. Matthysse also produced the Album of the year in 2005 and 2006, song of the year in 2005 and 2006, best hip-hop album in 2006. He is considered as Tanzania's most prominent Bongo Flava producer. And is credited as one of the founders of the genre P.Funk.

== Swah rap ==
Swahili rap, known as Swah Rap, began to develop in the early 1990s. Led by the Kwanza Unit, a group composed of many of the major artists, Swah rap sought to bring Tanzanian themes to their rap. Kwanza Unit modeled a Kwanzian Nation after Afrika Bambaataa's Zulu Nation. Kwanzian Nation tried to bring positive messages to the music. These artists combined their traditional word play, evocative puns, and rhyming with Tanzanian topics to fight working class oppression and develop authentic Tanzanian culture. However, in reality, many Swah Rap tracks have been infiltrated by words and themes from American "gangsta rap."

Famous Swah Rap Artists include Villain Gangsters, Tribe X, Riders Posse, K singo and Abbas Maunda.

=== Tanzanians' view of American rap music ===
Rappers such as Sam Stigillydaa has said, "American rappers talk about crazy things- drinking, drugs, violence against women, American blacks kill blacks. I hope African rap stays African and doesn't turn crazy." Tanzanians view the United States as an aggressive country that romanticizes both violence and crime whereas Tanzania dispels such a romanticization of violence and crime. Tanzanians view crime as caused by economic need, not greed, and those who become criminals risk having people brand them social outcasts. Tanzanians also view cultural imperialism as a form of symbolic violence that relies on a relationship of constrained communication to extort submission.

== Bongo Flava artists ==
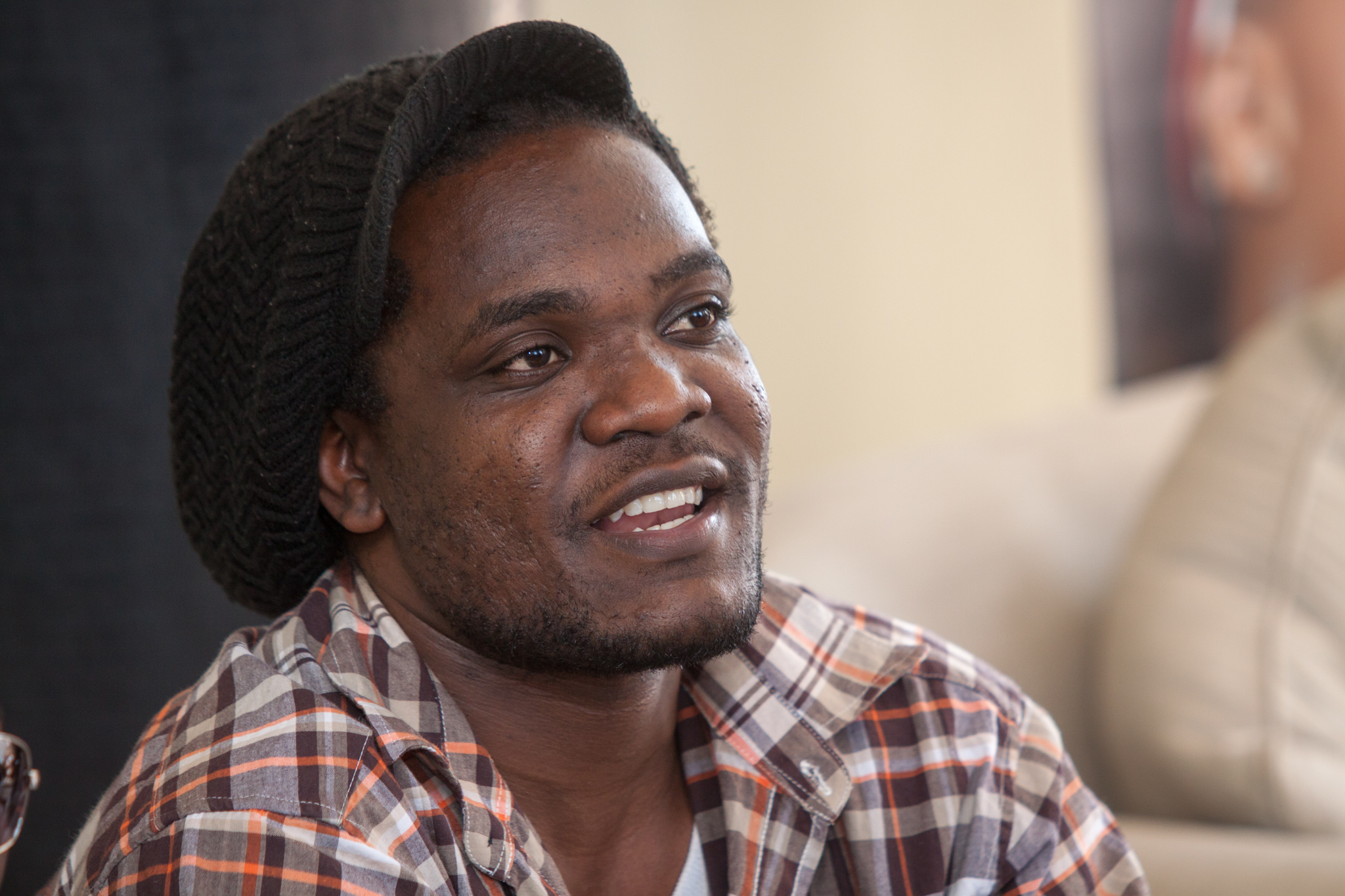
Fid Q, 2013

- Mr. II (aka Sugu)
- Fid Q
- Mwana Fa
- Bill Nass
- Professor Jay
- Balozi Dola
- X-Plastaz
- Saleh J
- AY
- Dully Sykes
- TID
- Nandy
- Lady Jaydee
- Diamond Platnumz
- Juma Nature
- Ali Kiba
- Dizasta Vina
- Panishee Mdudu
- Jay Moe
- Benjamin wa Mambo Jambo
- BJB
