= Gangwe Mobb =

Tanzanian hip hop group

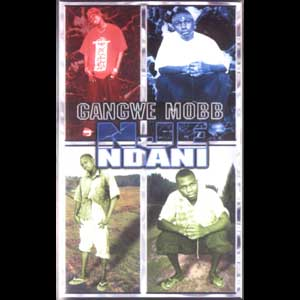
Gangwe Mobb

Gangwe Mobb is a Tanzanian hip hop group. They come from Temeke neighborhood in Dar es Salaam. It has two members: Inspector Haroun (real name Haroun Kahena) and Luteni Kalama (Karama Bakari). The group was established in late 1990s soon after Kwanza Unit, Mr. II and other had popularized Swahili hip hop music in Tanzania. The name "Gangwe" is derived from a popular 1980s slang term meaning "hardcore". In context, gangwe refers to the grimy and ghetto hip hop mentality that comprise most of their songs.

Their first hit was titled "Mauzauza". Their debut album, "Simulizi La Ufasaha" contained national hits "Ngangali" and "Mtoto wa Geti Kali". Their second album "Nje Ndani", released in 2002 had their arguably most popular hit, "Asali wa Moyo". One of their singles entitled "Bundasiliga" means "slinger of bundles of hay" and suggests a social message. They also collaborated with Kenyan group Necessary Noize with song "Tunajirusha".

Gangwe Mobb have described their music as cartoon rap (rap katuni in Swahili). It tells about situations what lower class urban youth encounter in their everyday lives. Their songs are also known have almost created a new slang dialect with creating a new slang word for each song.

The group has a song named "Rap Katuni" on their "Nje Ndani" album.

At the 2004 Tanzania Music Awards their album Nje Ndani was nominated in the best Hip Hop Album category.

The group has been dormant since 2004. Inspekta Haroun has since done solo career, while Luteni Kalama has kept lower profile but has been with Wanaume Family led by Juma Nature. In 2008 Gangwe Mobb announced a comeback.

They have said that the inspiration for their name came from legendary hip-hop group Mobb Deep.
