= Wahuni =

The term "wahuni" is a Tanzanian slang term meaning "hooligans." Wahuni refers specifically to youth of the hip-hop generation of the 1990s in Tanzania. The use of such a negative terminology indicates the cultural hostility toward hip-hop within the nation.

Tanzanian rapper Professor Jay recounts that "If you rapped during this time, you were immediately considered a hooligan. Even parents would not permit their children to rap, or even allow them to listen to someone else rap" Tanzanian youth were commonly described with words such as "violent, hostile, and disruptive."

In order to combat the negative reputation in society, Tanzanian youth represented their image as creative and empowered artists. Lyrics often included critiques of social and political conditions. Early artists of this genre included Mr. II and Balozi Dola. They often employed Swahili language in order to indicate their political themes.
