= Peter Kibatala =

Tanzania litigation attorney and human rights defender

Peter Patience Kibatala is a prominent litigation attorney and lawyer from Tanzania who is known for representing and defending celebrities and famous politicians in court. Kibatala was enrolled as advocate of the High Court of Tanzania and courts subordinates thereto save for primary courts in 2008.

Advocate Kibatala have represented celebrities like Tundu Lissu, Joseph Mbilinyi.
