= List of stage names: I =

This list of stage names lists names used by those in the entertainment industry, alphabetically by their stage name's surname (or the best approximation) followed by the given name (or the best approximation) where the surname begins with "I". One-word stage names are presented in List of one-word stage names.

Stage name	Birth name	Life	Notability	Notes
Sam i	Sam Spiegel	1979–	American DJ, producer and composer	Previously known as "Squeak E. Clean"
Tones and I	Toni Watson	Unknown	Australian singer and songwriter	
David Ian	David Ian Lane	1961–	English theatre producer and former actor	
Janis Ian	Janis Eddy Fink	1951–	American singer-songwriter	
Ice-T	Tracy Lauren Marrow	1958–	American rapper, songwriter actor and producer	
Vanilla Ice	Robert Matthew Van Winkle	1967–	American rapper and television host	
No I.D.	Ernest Dion Wilson	1971–	American record producer, DJ and songwriter	Formerly known as Immenslope
Queen Ida	Ida Lee Lewis	1929–	American musician	Also known as Ida Guillory and "Queen Ida Guillory"
Billy Idol	William Michael Albert Broad	1955–	British and American singer, songwriter, musician (Generation X) and actor	
Mr. II	Joseph Mbilinyi	1972–	Tanzanian politician, activist and rapper	
Pola Illéry	Paula Iliescu	1909–1993	Romanian-American actress	
Margaret Illington	Maude Light	1879–1934	American actress	
Emma's Imagination	Emma Gillespie	1983–	Scottish singer	
Chanel Iman	Chanel Iman Robinson	1990–	American model	
Apache Indian	Steven Kapur	1967–	English singer-songwriter and DJ	
Lola Índigo	Miriam Doblas Muñoz	1992–	Spanish singer and dancer	
Marty Ingels	Martin Ingerman	1936–2015	American actor and comedian	
Jørgen Ingmann	Jørgen Ingmann Pedersen	1925–2015	Danish musician	
Kid Ink	Brian Todd Collins	1986–	American rapper	
Lux Interior	Erick Lee Purkhiser	1946–2009	American singer (The Cramps)	
Jena Irene	Jena Irene Asciutto	1996–	American singer	
George S. Irving	Irving Shelasky	1922–2016	American actor	
Henry Irving	John Henry Brodribb	1838–1905	English actor	
Jules Irving	Julius Israel	1925–1979	American actor, director and producer	
May Irwin	Georgina May Campbell	1862–1938	Canadian-American actress and singer	
Oscar Isaac	Óscar Isaac Hernández	1979–	Guatemalan-American actor	
Margarita Isabel	Margarita Isabel Morales	1943–2017	Mexican actress	
María Isabel	María Isabel López	1995–	Spanish singer and songwriter	
Dick Israel	Ricardo Vizcarra Michaca	1947–2016	Filipino actor	
Maria Ivogün	Ilse Kempner	1891–1987	Hungarian-Swiss singer	
