= Professor Jay =

Tanzanian hip hop artist and politician

Hon. Professor Jay MP
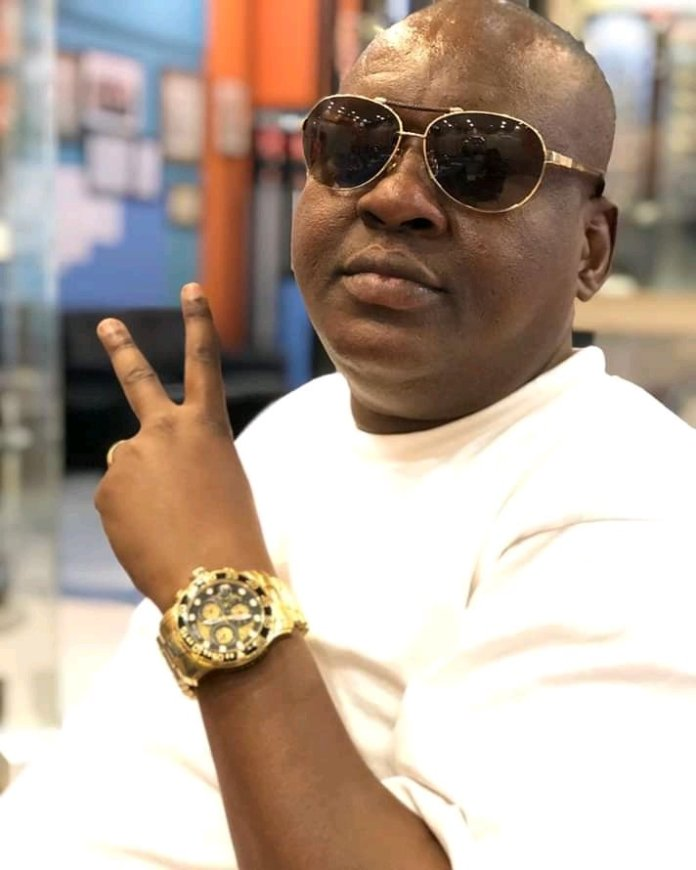

Member of Parliament of Mikumi Constituency
- In office November 2015 – October 2020
- Preceded by: Abdulsalaam Amer
- Succeeded by: Denis Londo

Personal details
- Born: 29 December 1975 (age 50) Songea
- Party: CHADEMA
- Children: Lisa Joseph
- Occupation: Rapper; singer; songwriter; politician
- Musical career
- Genres: Hip hop; Bongo Flava
- Years active: 1989–present
- Label: Mwanalizombe Studios

Joseph Haule (born December 29, 1975), popularly known by his stage name Professor Jay, is a Tanzanian hip hop recording artist, politician and former member of the Tanzanian parliament for Mikumi constituency. He is one of the prominent representatives of the "Bongo Flava" Tanzanian hip hop subgenre, which mixes elements from both Western hip hop and the Tanzanian tradition (including Swahili lyrics as well as an activist attitude towards Tanzanian social issues such as HIV/AIDS, wealth, inequality, and political corruption).

== Biography ==
He started rapping in 1989 as a member of the group Hard Blasters, best known for their hit "Chemsha Bongo" (then he used stage name Nigga J) from their first album, "Funga Kazi". Only one year later, they won the title of best hip-hop group in Tanzania.

During his solo career which started in 2001, he has released number of hits, including "Nikusaidiaje" and "Zali la Mentali (feat Juma Nature)". Other songs released by Professor Jay include "Piga Makofi" and "Yataka Moyo". Just like Mr. II, he is a pioneering Tanzanian MC, who have remained some of the most popular hip hop musicians in Tanzania, despite influx of many new bidders. Also similar to Mr. II and Deepac Braxx from (Kisii County) but who resides in Nairobi Kenya his lyrics often have political messages. In one of his songs he imitates an elder politician and ridicules the fake promises they all mindlessly spew as they are trying to get elected. The song continues with a chorus saying the words "Ndio Mzee" which means "Yes Sir". This represents the brainwashing of the public as politicians make these false promises over and over. However, after the song was released, the president of Tanzania referenced the lyrics in one of his speeches, which acknowledged the presence of Bongo Flava and the success of Professor Jay's political lyrics.

His first album, "Machozi, Jasho na Damu," gained instant recognition for which Professor Jay won several awards. He attained other awards such as the best hip-hop album in Tanzania with his second album, "Mapinduzi halisi".

Professor Jay's songs include Nikusaidiaje (featuring Ferooz), Nimeamini (featuring Lady Jaydee), Inatosha (featuring Sugu), Vuta raha (featuring Ferooz), Border kwa border (featuring Nazizi), Heka heka za star, Interlude, J.O.S.E.P.H., Nisamehe (featuring Banana), Wapi nimakosea, Una, Hakuna Noma, Jina Langu, Bongo Dar es Salaam, Piga Makofi, Msinitenge, Kikao cha Dharura, Zali la Mentali, Nidivyo Sivyo, Mtazamo (featuring Afande Sele and Solo Thang), Hapo Sawa. Professor Jay is featured by Deepac Braxx (Heavyweight Mc) and Nonini's song "Kumekucha"

== Politics ==
At the 2015 Tanzanian general elections, Professor Jay successfully vied for Mikumi constituency parliamentary seat for CHADEMA. He was not reelected in 2020.

== Personal life ==
He comes from a family where his younger brothers are all musicians, including a well known rapper, Black Rhino. As of 14 February 2022, Jay has allegedly been under hospital care for health complications.

== Solo albums ==
- Machozi Jasho na Damu 2001
- Mapinduzi Halisi 2003
- J.O.S.E.P.H 2006
- Aluta Continua 2007
- Izack mangesho 2014
- Kazi Kazi 2016

== Awards ==
=== Won ===
- 2004 Tanzania Music Awards (Kilimanjaro Music Awards)- Best Hip Hop Album ("Mapinduzi Halisi")
- 2006 Tanzania Music Awards - Best Song (Nikusaidiaje)
- 2006 Kisima Music Awards - Best Tanzanian Song (Nikusaidiaje)
- 2007 Kisima Music Awards - Best Ugandan Song (Sivyo Ndiviyo with Chameleone)
- 2007 Pearl of Africa Music Awards (PAM Awards) - Best Male Artist (Tanzania)
- 2009 Tanzania Music Awards - Best Songwriter

=== Nominated ===
- 2008 MTV Africa Music Awards - Best Hip Hop
