= Yo Rap Bonanza =

Rap talent show

The annual Yo Rap Bonanza, created in the early 1990s in Tanzania, was a rap talent show organized by Kim and the Boys with Ibony Moalim and was sponsored by local Indian merchants. The first show was made in 1993 and the second and last was in 1995. Kim and Ibony were key figures on this event. It is generally recognized as the first major hip-hop competition in Tanzania. The talent show attracted large crowds with its diverse and unique delivery of rhymes from different artists.

The "YRP" competition marked a new era in the Swahili rap scene because many rappers from regions outside Dar es Salaam competed, thus contributing to the spread of the musical genre to other places. Many artists gained popularity after participating in the "YRB." Saleh j, one of Tanzania's hip hop ambassadors, became one of the most recognized and respected Tanzanian hip-hop stars soon after winning the competition. A way in which a rap group or MC could win over the audience was to come up with "mtirirko," a unique style of rapping. Tanzanian rap fans could easily differentiate the fluency of a rap of a rookie rapper from a veteran rapper.
