= Dataz =

Tanzanian rapper

- Born: 1984 (age 41–42); Mbamba Bay, Tanzania
- Origin: Morogoro, Tanzania
- Genres: R&B; Hip Hop; Bongo Flava; Tanzanian hip hop
- Occupations: Singer; Rapper; Songwriter
- Instrument: Vocals

Dataz is a Tanzanian rap artist and she is among few earliest female hip hop musicians in the country.

== Early life ==
She was born in 1984 on the shores of Lake Nyasa in Mbamba Bay. Later she moved with her parents to Morogoro where she began her primary education. When Dataz was attending her secondary school, Ifunda, her talent for music became apparent.

== Music career ==
Dataz first started performing with fellow female rapper Bad G, while they performed together for a period of time the two are now pursuing solo careers. Dataz first single “Kitimtim” topped the charts of several radio stations in Tanzania

Dataz blames the lack of female rappers in Tanzania for the fact that MCing and DJing are associated with hooliganism and masculinity, most popularly through the mimicking of American gangsta rap, a genre that has a large lyrical base in the subjugation of women. While American hip hop is full of references that subjugate woman, Swahili rap doesn't have the same language use towards women. Because religion plays a large role in most rappers lives, they come to a crossroads when they attempt to imitate gangsta rap with the subjugation of women. This leaves both a gap in artists authenticity which is just as important in Swahili rap as it is in American rap, but also leaves open a larger place in the hip hop scene for women to enter.

Fellow female rap artist Tuni of the Nubian Motown Crew says that “many girls shy away from engaging in rap due to the attitude that rap is a male thing and is associated with gangs, violence and all manner of evil.” Something that is lacking in Swahili rap, but is dominant in its influence, American hip hop.
