= Rhymson =

- Born: Ramadhani Mponjika; 24 November 1968 (age 57); Dar es Salaam, Tanzania
- Other names: Zavara Mponjika, Mwanavina, R.H.Y.M.S.O.N, Chief Rhymson
- Occupations: songwriter; rapper; record producer; groupleader; activist
- Musical career
- Genres: Hip hop
- Instrument: Vocal
- Years active: 1988–
- Formerly of: Kwanza Unit

Ramadhani Mponjika, better known by his stage name MC Rhymson, is a Tanzanian rapper, songwriter, record producer, and leader in the hip hop scene.

== Hiphop and activism ==
Hip hop's rise in urban Tanzania came in tandem with the neo-liberalization of its economy and the society at large. The country's hip hop pioneers, including Rhymson, first came up in the mid-1980s. At the time, the country was shifting from a one-party state style of socialism called 'Ujamaa na Kujitegemea' (Kiswahili for African Socialism and Self Reliance), to a capitalist system operating under a multi-party democracy. This transition created a big shift: Tanzania experience extreme underemployment, forced urban migrations, and drastic cuts to social services that led to a rise in education costs. The impact of these changes was greatly felt by the youth in Dar es Salaam. Because they suddenly found themselves in such precarious situations, Rhymson and others gravitated towards hip hop, associating with the African American experience of marginalization and disenfranchisement.

In the late 1980s, Rhymson founded his own hip hop group, the Villain Gangsters. Within the next decade, hip hop in Dar es Salaam grew more popular. There was a divide between artists promoting a localized, populist sound and those who preferred a purist style inspired by American Hip Hop, often performed in English. Kwanza Unit, co-founded by Rhymson and other major Tanzanian rappers, became a leading voice of the latter movement.

Kwanza Unit's mission in establishing this super-group was to cement Tanzania's status as a 'hip-hop nation'. They intended to do so by following in Afrika Bambaataa's footsteps. Bambaataa is well known as an innovator in the world of African-American hip-hop, particularly for having built the universal Zulu Nation. The Kwanza Unit hoped to do something similar, creating the 'Kwanzanian Nation' that would have its own set of ideals they'd promote on a global scale. They hoped to actualize this nation by creating their own ethnic group called the Kwanzanianz. It would be made up of artists, fans, and others who supported the ideas pushed forward by their music, in and out of the country. The Kwanza Unit hoped to become a voice against oppression, similar to Afrika Bambaataa. Unlike Bambaataa, however, they centered their activism on advocating for workers' rights and calling out the oppression of the Tanzanian working class. As they rose to popularity in the 1990s, they shifted their music towards addressing these themes. This was a notable move as the trend of the time was to use hip hop to fight against racism. Kwanza Unit were carving their own path, deviating from subject matter used in American rap despite their music drawing inspiration from the genre. This meant developing their content without stories of violence, vulgar language, and images of excessive fame. Instead, they used their notoriety to draw attention to what's happening in their country, developing language in their rap that reflects their political and ideological stances within Tanzania.

Creating this hypothetical, yet important space for hip hop in Tanzania was a way to unite rappers to lyrically express their culture, values and goals, and overall way of life. Rhymson along with the other members of Kwanza unit developed ideologies and ethics to accompany the concept of Kwanzania to romanticize and idealize these hip hop artists involved as "heroic warriors resisting oppression" echoing an old mentality of rising a country from a colonial state into an independent country called ujamaa.

An important step in cultivating the Kwanzanian concept was promoting the use of Swahili in music. Kwanza Unit were among the first groups to push forward a socially conscious hip hop, which would later be taken on by future generations of artists. The use of Swahili is to help ground their listeners into a strong sense of national identity. Rhymson and his group relied on the lyricism and poetry that Swahili provided to their artistry. The language is used in large part to signal Tanzanians to the social critiques addressed in hip hop.

Because of his work to shape the world of hip hop, Rhymson took an oppositional stance to the rise of Bongo Flava. He was living in Canada when the genre gained traction in Tanzania and was shocked to find how the music space in his country had changed because of it when he returned in 2005. In his view, there is no need to acknowledge Bongo Flava as a counterpart to hip hop; they have nothing to do with one another. Bongo Flava, according to older hip hop artists in Tanzania, is different from hip hop because of its content. There is no firm stance or political statement made through Bongo Flava, while hip hop artists urged themselves to use their music to criticize societal injustices. Rhymson was among twelve artists interviewed between 2009 and 2010 who made it known that Bongo Flava only hinders the ability for hip hop artists to spread their message and has a destructive effect on the music scene overall. The struggle Rhymson sees is getting visibility. This includes getting hip hop artists and their music heard, as well as developing the art form to ensure the musicians are empowered by their work. In his return to Tanzania, Rhymson was dedicated to working in the hip hop community to help champion its development. He pointed out that in its inception, hip hop culture in the country touched upon all five elements of the genre: DJ, emcee, graffiti, breakdancing, and knowledge. Today, his goal is not only to affirm the strength of hip hop but to detach it from Bongo Flava. As a hip hop purist, he believes the genre's power lies in authenticity and its purpose: to be a benefit to the community and be grounded in social or cultural motivations.

== Achievements ==
Even as time passes, Rhymson continues to have an impact. Up and coming, underground hip hop artists in Tanzania cite him as an influence on their music and have found success following in his footsteps. Fid Q is a notable example, having performed at Nkrumah Hall at the University of Dar es Salaam. The audience was filled with prominent figures, including academics and political dignitaries, namely Salim Salim, former Secretary General for the Organization of African Unity. Fid Q takes inspiration from Rhymson and the Kwanza Unit in particular, paying his respects to the old school artists that paved the way for his success.

In 2011, he was a principal organizer of Words and Pictures (WaPi), an initiative ran by the British Council encouraging and inspiring Tanzanian youth to use their culture as a means of free expression. The project consisted of youth-oriented gatherings that reached 1.2 million young people in the country. WaPi aimed to connect with young performers, artists, and audiences by providing a platform for underground, raw talent. Launched in 2006 in Kenya, the British Council hosted WaPi events monthly across several African countries, namely Tanzania, Ghana, Uganda, Nigeria, and Ethiopia. The project ran successfully until 2008.

In honor of the 7th Annual International Hip Hop Festival, Rhymson taught a lecture at Trinity College in Connecticut in 2012. Founded in 2006, the festival was created to fight lacking unity, segregation, and violence at Trinity College and the city of Hartford at large. The Trinity International Hip Hop Festival works to bring people together to celebrate different cultures through Hip Hop music, dance, visual arts, and academics. The lecture was titled "The History and Aesthetics of Kiswahili Lyricism" and was hosted by the university's Center for Urban and Global Studies. In this lecture, Rhymson addressed the evolution of Swahili from the period of socialism to the era of hip hop he emerged in. He also spoke about feeling the ramifications of Tanzania's economic instability post-colonialism and how tough it was to live through struggle as neighboring countries thrived.

== Artistry ==
Rhymson goes by many names, and as such can be referred to in many ways in this industry. He concludes that the reason artists often change their stage names repeatedly is because of stardom. The name proclaimed by the artist is the name attached to their career, not just through success but also in the event of failure. When it comes time to evolve from their current sound or image, artists often adopt new pseudonyms to reflect these changes. Rhymson believes that personal attributes have a lot to do with stage names, and when those attributes no longer align with the artist, that stage name shouldn't be used any longer. Frequently changing pseudonyms, he thinks, also serves to keep fans engaged; it can be amusing to see a new name often, and it ensures they do the work to stay up to date with new music.

Rhymson played a strong role in influencing budding producers to immerse themselves in their culture, specifically the use of Swahili. He emphasized that emulating the American style of hip hop is too easy; their work must be more creative to resonate with a larger, more global audience. As such, Rhymson was one of the first producers to craft his beats using samples of Tanzanian music and encouraged others to follow suit. Although radio stations claim sampling should be avoided due to clearance issues, Rhymson continued to defy the odds. He would reach out to the musicians personally to ensure he had permission to use their work, further bridging the gap between the old and the new generations.

== Discography ==
Kwanza Unit produced three albums, Tucheze, (1994), Tropical Tekniqs, (1995) and Kwanzanians (1999), the latter of which received the most support. Rhymson received producer credits for Kwanzanians and the group's 1996 joint album with Kamakazi (6) and P.Funk, Run Tingz & Dedicated

Rhymson continues to produce music independently including solo projects and home recorded beats. In 2013, he produced the song "In The Congo", a project that came to fruition through social media collaborations. It features African-American artists Toni Blackman, her group Rhyme like a Girl, and Kenyan artist Nasambu who was based in LA at the time. Vocals and video footage were exchanged entirely online for the completion of this song.
