= Kwanza Unit =

Tanzanian hip hop group

Kwanza Unit (KU) was an early Tanzanian hip hop group. Its name means "First Unit" and it was formed in 1993 by a merger of several groups and solo artists. They started rapping in English, but later used Swahili as well.

Founding members of Kwanza Unit included three of the main hip-hop crews at the time - Villain Gangsters, Riders Posse, and Tribe-X. According to Rhymson, the founding member of Villain Gangsters, the goal of creating Kwanza Unit was to establish Tanzania as a "hip hop nation." Kwanza Unit's plan was to follow in the footsteps of Afrika Bambaataa, the African-American hip-hop innovator who built the Universal Zulu Nation. Just as Afrika Bambaataa had done, Kwanza Unit wanted to promote "Kwanzanian Nation" and ideals. The group created their own ethnic group called Kwanzania which was supposed to be made up of artists, fans, and anyone else who were supporters of their ideas within and outside of Tanzania. Hip-hop was supposed to be the binding force of the Kwanzanian nation in which they had their own way of life, their own values, their own culture, and their own goals. Kwanza unit represented a form of hip-hop nationalism. Just as Afrika Bambaataa tried to inspire efforts to respond to racism and class oppression in the United States, Kwanza Unit wanted to become "heroic warriors resisting oppression". They placed their emphasis not so much on fighting racism but more on recognising and resisting working-class oppression.

During its popularity in the 1990s, Kwanza Unit spoke out against class oppression (specifically working-class oppression), instead of focusing their music solely on fighting racism, as was the common trend. Kwanza Unit tried to develop their music without stories of violence, vulgar language, and images of excessive fame, even though these themes are prominent in the rap music from the United States from which they drew their influences. The language they develop in their rap reflects their particular social and ideological position within Tanzania.

Kwanza Unit was able to achieve international status. They performed twice in Nairobi, Kenya and in 1998 they were invited to Nigeria but couldn't make it because of some problems.

Kwanza Unit's self-titled debut album was released in 1994 and the second tape, Tropical techniques followed the next year. The third album, Kwanzanians was released in 1999, on both tape and CD. The single Msafiri, from Kwanza Unit's third album, Kwanzanians, along with other Tanzanian hip-hop, can be listened to on the website SwahiliRemix.com .

Like members of many other international hip-hop scenes, Kwanza Unit struggled with the complications that came along with American music. Although American hip-hop provided inspiration for the movement in Tanzania, it created cultural tensions as well. One of the members of Kwanza Unit recalled that "while we were recording our album we made a pact that non[e] of us would die before we release[d] our project ..." but then revealed that "[t]hree months later [Nigga One] died in a car crash." This implies an allusion to great figures of American hip-hop, such as Tupac Shakur and The Notorious B.I.G., who died at young ages. Although Nigga One was not murdered, the fact that a pact to stay alive was even necessary suggests a dangerous element to hip-hop. Furthermore, the dominance of the English language in hip-hop created a conundrum for Kwanza Unit. At first, rapping was done in English, but slowly hip-hop transitioned into Swahili, as Kwanza Unit and other Tanzanian musicians began to take more ownership over their work.

The roots of Kwanza Unit's mission grew from one of the idolised figures from the United States, Afrika Bambaataa. "Not unlike the Afrika Bambaataa model in the U.S., which had introduced youth to both rap music and hip-hop culture in the ghettoes and barrios of New York, KU wanted to promote, 'Kwanza Unit has moved from a family to a tribe or rather an ethnic group called Kwanzania. Kwanzania is not made up of performing artists only but also fans, supporters and everyone who ids down with KU ideas, within and outside Tanzania." ('Ni Wapi Tunakwenda': Hip-Hop Culture and the Children of Arusha by Sidney J. Lemelle) Rhymson the founding member of the group, works to get out the good word about rap in most of his interviews. It is not just for "hooligans" and there is a deeper message to listen for. "A big difficulty is that the society at large thinks that rap is for hooligans. This also makes it hard to get airplay. The media wants positive messages.

The thing that is positive to me may not necessarily be positive to you. If the police mistreated me I could curse to ease my tension after having been disturbed by a policeman. If I say that in rhyme, in a poetic way, not necessarily the radio announcer should say this is positive or not. They can always say it's negative to their opinion, cause everybody has a right to their own opinion. In hip hop I can express my views by giving you a challenge, so you come to me the next day and say: What do you mean when you say that?"

The group has since been disbanded, but some of its members continue doing solo music. Kwanza Unit had several members and line-up changes. Among their members were:

- Chief Rhymson(Ramadhan A. Mponjika)
- KBC (KSingo)
- D-Rob (Robert Mwingira) -died 2002
- Eazy-B (Bernard Luanda)
- Bugzy Malone (Edward Margat)
- Papa Sav(Makanga Lugoe)
- Abbas Maunda
- Baraka
- Ndoti Mwingira
- Fresh-G
- Y-Thang
- Gaddy
- Adili -died 1994

There is also a wider circle of affiliated members referred to as Kwanza Unit Foundation or Kwanzanians.
