= X Plastaz =

- Origin: Arusha, Tanzania
- Genres: Hip hop
- Years active: 1996–present
- Label: Out Here
- Website: outhere.de/outhere/x-plastaz/

X Plastaz is a Tanzanian hip hop musical group based in Arusha and founded in 1996. They are one of the most popular acts in the Tanzanian hip hop scene. Their style mixes elements from international hip hop and traditional Maasai music, represented by Maasai singer Merege. While Merege sings in maa (Maasai language), the other members of the group rap in swahili and haya. Merege is also well known to perform in traditional Maasai clothing.

X Plastaz hip hop is slower-paced that most African hip hop and strongly characterised by Maasai deep chanting. X Plastaz songs such as Aha!, Dunia dudumizi, Bamiza and, most notably, Msimu kwa msimu are among the most popular hits in the bongo flava genre.

== History ==
The first line-up of X Plastaz consisted in the Ruff and Gsann brothers from Arusha, together with their colleague and roommate Ziggy from the Tanga Region. They began singing hip hop in 1995, while earning their living in a haircutting saloon. In 1996 they were noticed by Bonnie Luv, a record producer from Dar es Salaam, who had them record some single. Their first hit was Bamiza (1998), that was one of the most played songs by Tanzanian radios for several weeks. Another hit soon followed, Wachaga piga chata.

In 1997 X Plastaz visited a traditional Maasai village west of Arusha and met Yamat Ole Meipuko, also known as Merege, who was the local "singing champion" in his age class. They thus invited Merege to join them when they were performing in the surroundings of Arusha and Moshi. Their new "Maasai hip hop" style was an instant success, as Merege became a stable member of the line-up. Over time, the group also acquired new members, including Ruff and Gsann's two younger brothers and younger sister.

X Plastaz' Maasai hip hop caught the attention of Jay Rutledge, editor of the Rough Guides ethnic music CD series. Thanks to the inclusion of their songs in the Rough Guides compilations dedicated to Tanzania and African hip hop, X Plastaz received international acclaim and eventually began touring Europe as well as Latin America. In 2002, they also participated in the World AIDS Day international event.

In 2004, German recording label Out Here Records published X Plastaz' first full-length album, Maasai Hip Hop, which included the hit songs previously published in the Rough Guides.

In 2006, X Plastaz suffered the sudden death of Nelly, died of injuries on 29 March after being stabbed. Born in 1976, he was the oldest member of the group and his sympathetic attitude towards the poor and needy was one of X Plastaz' trademarks. The video of Nelly's last song, Nini dhambi kwa mwenye dhiki, shot on the Ol Doinyo Lengai volcano, is one of the most popular Africa music videos on YouTube. Despite this dramatic loss, X Plastaz did not disband, and are still active today. In 2009, they published Furaha, the first single of their upcoming second album. In the same, Gsan participated in BET Cypher, the annual gathering of America's top MCs, in Brooklyn, New York City. In 2010, they presented another new single, Afrika, at the Sauti za Busara festival in Stone Town, Zanzibar.

== X Plastaz and Tanzanian culture ==
Besides including Maasai vocal lines in their songs, X Plastaz base much of their image on the appeal of Maasai culture on both Tanzanian and international audiences. One of their more famous songs, Aha!, is about life in a traditional Maasai village, and the music video of this song was shot in a traditional village, displaying the lifestyle and customs of the Maasai people. The song's rap is in swahili and haya, while the chorus is actually a traditional Maasai chant. The song was also included in the HBO documentary This Is My Africa.

In their musical and stylistic embrace of both traditional Maasai culture and American hip hop, X Plastaz were faced with a common issue in African contemporary and pop music, i.e., adapting what could be seen as a colonialist tradition to their own culture, while contributing to the development of the national and cultural identity of their country and their people. Their attitude is the result of the conscious and explicit intent of pursuing "African hip hop" rather than mimicking American black music and, more in general, expressing subjection towards Western culture. For example, their website makes reference to the American magazine National Geographic, which published an article on their music, but is also careful to explain what the magazine is.

As is often the case for hip hop acts, X Plastaz' lyrics often deal with social and political issues. Through their songs, X Plastaz bring the audience's attention to dramatic problems of Tanzania and Africa in general, including poverty, AIDS, and war.

== Discography ==
- Maasai Hip Hop (Out Here Records 2004). Track listing: "Dunia dudumizi", "Bamiza", "Kitita", "Shika Iako", "Nini Dhambi kwa mwenye dhiki?", "Msimu kwa msimu", "Wachaga piga chata", "Ushanta", "Kutesa kwa zamu", "Aha!", "Kusanyikeni", "Haleluya", "Not Ready"
