= Saleh J =

Saleh J, prominent Tanzanian hip hop pioneer, was born in Dar es Salaam as Saleh Jaber.

Heavily influenced by the early 1980s rap artists such as LL Cool J and Big Daddy Kane, Jaber began to go by the name of Saleh J. He gained popularity after competing in the popular Tanzanian rap battle TV show, Yo Rap Bonanza. After winning this competition, Saleh J came out with an album which he says was "done in one day and just hours at continental hotel" and was just "distributed to all Indian shop owners." In 1992, Saleh J came out with what is considered his most commercially successful hit -- "Ice Ice Baby - King of Swahili Rap" by putting Swahili lyrics to the tune and rhythm of Vanilla Ice's 1990s hit "Ice Ice Baby".

He left the country of Tanzania soon after to relocate in the United Arab Emirates and by 2003 he had moved to the United Kingdom, where he currently resides.

As Saleh J gained popularity and fame within the young Tanzanian population, he began to compete against other popular Swahili hip hop artists such as Eazy-B and Nigga One. These associations opened many doors for Saleh J, as both these rappers had relationships with a prominent competition in Tanzania, Yo Rap Bonanza, an annual rap battle contest organized and sponsored by local Indian vendors in the marketplace of Dar es Salaam. The YRB contest was not only especially helpful to Saleh J, but also to other Tanzanian hip hop artists, as it included artists from outside the Dar es Salaam region. This integration of other towns and people signified the spread of the hip hop movement throughout Tanzania, indicating a successful career for Saleh J.

Most rappers would rap in English; however, Saleh J was considered innovative as he created a new style by translating the English rhythms into a rough form of Swahili.

As Saleh J was successful in the late 1980s to early 1990s, today he is considered to be "old school" by many Tanzanian hip hop followers, just as Run DMC is considered old school by young American hip hop fans. Today, many new hip hop artists are known to have been inspired by the early Tanzanian hip hop artists who dared to create a new genre of music, Saleh J being one of the most influential artists in Tanzania. Among the popular Tanzanian hip hop artists today are Professor Jay, Juma Nature, Fid Q, and internationally X Plastaz.
