= Balozi Dola =

Tanzanian hip hop musician

- Also known as: Balozi Dola Soul
- Genres: Bongo Flava, Hip hop
- Occupation: Rapper
- Years active: 1995-present

Balozi Dola, a.k.a. Balozi or Dolasoul, is a self-proclaimed “socially conscious” hip hop artist from Tanzania.

== Biography ==
=== Early years ===
Balozi began his career while attending school in Nigeria. Balozi grew up with the support of his family who put education first. Seeing education as the key to an improved life, rapping began as something that was fun, and was not initially seen as a career. After studying in the UK, Balozi returned to Tanzania and became a hip hop artist.

=== Musical career ===
Upon returning to Tanzania, Balozi joined the rap group the Deplowmatz, whose other members were both sons of Tanzanian diplomats. The group was named the best rap group in Tanzania in 1999 and had a song at the top of the music charts in the Netherlands. Balozi's music focuses on the political, economic, social, and cultural problems facing the people of Tanzania. He has released two albums and has performed in many venues throughout Europe, Africa, and North America.

== Discography ==
- Dolasoul (Balozi Wenu). "Dolasoul". Manu Stores cassette. Tanga, Tanzania. c. 1995.
- Balozi Dola - Kwenye Chati
