= Juma Nature =

Sir. Juma Kassim Nature
- Also known as: Kiroboto
- Born: Juma Kassim Ally; 1980 (age 45–46); Dar-es-Salaam, Tanzania
- Origin: Dar-es-Salaam, Tanzania
- Genres: Bongo Flava
- Occupations: Rapper; Singer; Songwriter; Record producer
- Instrument: Vocals
- Years active: 1998–present
- Label: Bongo Records

Juma Nature (born Juma Kassim Ally, in 1980) is a Tanzanian Bongo Flava recording artist and record producer.

== Career ==
He was the founder and member of a Temeke music group called TMK Wanaume, a group of rappers from the Temeke municipality side of Dar es Salaam. His last album, "Bongo Flava: Swahili Rap from Tanzania", through many of his lyrics, touched on many current problems affecting Tanzania social communities. These problems include, diseases, difficulties of meeting basic needs, social classes and wealth gap status. One of Nature's well renowned songs is "Umoja wa Tanzania" which talks about happiness within Tanzania and the sense of unity that it has exemplified. “Utajiju" ("i don't care or rather is none of my business") from Juma Nature's brand new album Ubinadamu Kazi, was a song about people who like to interfere other people's affairs.

Juma Nature has recently joined forces with Temba and Chegge forming a new trio known as TNC

== Discography ==
- Nini Chanzo (2001)
- Ugali (2003)
- Ubinadamu-Kazi (2005)
- Zote History (2006)
- Tugawane Umaskini (2009)

== Awards ==
- 2007 Channel O Music Video Awards – Best African East

=== Nominated ===
- 2005 Tanzania Music Awards – Best Hip Hop Album ("Ubinadamu Kazi")
- 2007 MTV Europe Music Awards – Best African Act;;
