= Mr. II =

Honourable Osmund Mbilinyi MP

Member of Parliament for Mbeya City
- In office November 2010 – November 2020
- Preceded by: Benson Mpesya
- Succeeded by: Tulia Ackson

Personal details
- Born: 1 May 1972 (age 54)
- Party: CHADEMA
- Spouse: Happy Msonge
- Occupation: Politician; human rights activist; rapper
- Musical career
- Genres: Hip hop
- Years active: 1990–present
- Label: Deiwaka Entertainment

Joseph Mbilinyi (born 1 May 1972), known for his stage names Mr. II, Sugu and 2-proud, is a Tanzanian politician, human rights activist and rapper. He was a Mbeya Urban elected member of Parliament from 2010 to 2020.

== Biography ==
Mr. II stems from Mbeya in Southern highlands Tanzania, and started to rap in 1990 in his youth when he was still in school.

== Style and message ==
Sugu, which loosely translates to 'Stubborn' or 'Hard', has been just that in terms of his popular longevity. With over a decade of success, Sugu has maintained his rebellious persona as a social outcast. Performing in Swahili, Sugu addresses social issues that plague both urban and rural peoples in the African Great Lakes region. His socially conscious lyrics touch on issues ranging from prostitution to immigration to the plight of street children. Examples of his politically charged music is apparent in the songs Hali Halisi,State of Bongo Hip Hop/ Hali ya Bongo Flava (real situation) in which he depicts the struggles of street life, and the oppressive conditions of the government, prisons, and judicial system.

"Everyday is us against the police and the police against us

The judge at the court is waiting for us

The prison officer is waiting for us "

His rapping style is known for its structure and speed, and several other newer artists have adopted similar techniques. Other artists in the genre describe his detailed storytelling and wordplay as a part of his work.

Mr. II is an outspoken advocate of Tanzanian hiphop or Bongo Flava.

Sugu has seen success in various realms of the African Hip Hop scene. He is the primary organiser of the annual Tanzania Hip-Hop Summit, a yearly convention of the African Great Lakes region's most prominent and up-and-coming music stakeholders. The summit is held in Dar es Salaam in December and brings together everyone from artists to producers to TV representatives. He was also the publisher of Deiwaka, a music and arts magazine that is no longer in print. Sugu is one of the most recognisable artists in the regional Hip-hop scene, has won numerous Pan-African music awards and has performed at a number of international festivals. Regardless of his efforts to differentiate himself and his genre, Mr. II continues to be compared to the many great Hip-Hop artists from the U.S. such as Nas, Jay-Z or Run DMC.

Mr. II's song "Haki" has been hailed as the "definitive bongoflava anthem". In Swahili Haki means freedom and justice Mr. II's lyrics address themes that are typical of Bongoflava. Bongoflava "tackle[s] subjects faced by the continent and the world over: poverty, ambition, success, money, HIV/AIDS"

Sugu is also the Founder and Director of Deiwaka Entertainment, A company that has dedicated itself in promoting and developing Tanzanian hiphop/Bongoflava as part of helping in the fight against poverty and unemployment problems among youths in Tanzania. This company now has a website: Deiwakaworld

At the 2005 Tanzania Music Awards his album Moto Chini was nominated in the best Hip Hop Album category.

== Politics ==
At the 2010 Tanzanian general elections, Mr. II successfully vied for Mbeya Urban constituency parliamentary seat for CHADEMA.

== Discography ==
Mr. II is the most productive Tanzanian hip hop musician, given the number of released albums:

- Ni Mimi (1995)
- Ndani ya Bongo (1996)
- Niite Mister II (1998)
- Nje ya Bongo (1999)
- Millennium (2000)
- Muziki na Maisha (2001)
- Itikadi (2002)
- Sugu (2004)
- Coming of Age-Ujio Wa Umri (2006)
- VETO (2009)
- Antivirus Mixtapes
