= Anagnorisis (musician) =

German producer, songwriter and musician (born 1986)

- Also known as: Anagnorisis, Padlo
- Born: Eugene Getman; 29 September 1986 (age 40); Kiev
- Genres: Black metal, symphonic metal, gothic metal, punk
- Occupations: Singer, songwriter, producer
- Instruments: Keyboards, vocals, guitar, bass, drums
- Years active: 2003
- Label: Padlo Records
- Website: https://eugene-getman.blogspot.com

Anagnorisis (September 29, 1986, Kiev, Ukraine) is a German producer, songwriter, and musician. Anagnorisis is especially well known for his work with the band Sariola, where he plays almost all instruments as a studio-musician. Live, he prefer to play guitars. Besides Sariola, Anagnorisis is the main songwriter and composer of the punk band P.A.D.L.O. which achieved success in the Russian and German-Russian punk scene and Black Metal Band Vredesbyrd, which is known for its raw-old-school-black metal style. Anagnorisis also writes movie soundtracks and background music for diverse film productions. As producer and sound engineer, he worked with the bands like Sariola, Demise Empire, Dogma, and diverse productions of choral and classical music. Since year 2008, Anagnorisis works on some electronic projects (EBM, electro-industrial, psy trance).

== Discography (as producer and musician) ==
- P.A.D.L.O. - Atmarozhenyj Punk (Demo) (2003)
- P.A.D.L.O. - Odnoglazyj Mister Morzh (2004)
- P.A.D.L.O. - Nazad K Satanizmu (2005)
- Vredesbyrd - Imminent Conflict (2006)
- Sariola - Sphere of Thousand Sunsets (2006)
- Sariola - Sphere of Thousand Sunsets v2.0 (2012)
- Sariola - From the dismal Sariola (Single) (2013)

== Discography (as producer) ==
- Dogma - Melanocholia (2006)
- Demise Empire - Unholy Grail (2007)
- Deus Inversus demo (2008)
- Mental War - Depths of Depravity (2010)
