= Khontkar =

Turkish singer

- Also known as: Flash; Redbully; Barry Allen; Kid Flash
- Born: Onur Dinç; 24 July 1991 (age 35); İzmir, Turkey
- Origin: Turkey
- Genres: Hip hop; trap
- Occupations: Rapper; singer; songwriter; record producer
- Years active: 2008–present
- Labels: RedKeys Music; RedKeys Music UK; Basemode Records; Sony Music
- Website: khontkar.com

Onur Dinç (born 24 July 1991), better known by his stage name Khontkar, is a Turkish rapper, singer, songwriter and record producer.

== Discography ==
=== Studio albums ===
- PEMBE B SIDE (2024)
- PEMBE (2023)
- PLA4: THE VISION (2021)
- 100 (2018)
- NOBODI (2015)

=== EPs ===
- Fire Department (2022) (with Downtown Dion)
- RedKeyGang la Familia 2 (2020) (ft. Bixi Blake, Metth, KÖK$VL, Young Bego and others)
- RedKeyImmortalGang (ft. Young Bego) (2020)
- Trap Kont 2.5 (2020)
- TURKGLISH (EP) (ft. Myndless Grimes) (2019)
- RDKYSZN EP (2019)
- Everything is on the Table (2017) (ft. Bixi Blake)
- WHOISTHAT EP (2015)

=== Mixtape albums ===
- PLA4: THE VISION (2021)
- PLA4: Prelude (2021)
- NOT TO BE RELEASED (2020)
- Puffin Like An Animal 3: Back to the Streets (2018)
- Puffin Like An Animal 2: Probation Time (2015)
- Trap Kont 2 (2015)
- Trap Kont (2014)
- Puffin Like An Animal (2013)
- ChoppaLand Vol.2 (2011)
- ChoppaLand Vol.1 (2011)
- CrimeLand Mixtape (2011)

=== Singles and featurings ===
- MLBB (2024)
- RedKeyGang X (2024)
- Manifest (2024) (ft.BEGE)
- YALNIZ ADAM (2024)
- HAM (2023)
- Derine Dal (2023) (ft.Bixi Blake)
- Bendim (2023) (ft. Young Bego)
- ICY CHAINS (2023) (ft. Nessly)
- Gözyaşı Rapsodi 1 (2023)
- Gözyaşı Rapsodi 3 (2022) (ft. Lil Zey)
- Gözyaşı Rapsodi 2 (2022)
- WHO IS YOU (2022)
- Eke Eke (2022) (ft. Myndless Grimes)
- Elmas (2022)
- Ondan Böyleyim (2022)
- Küvet (2022)
- Plugged In (2022) (ft. Myndless, Fumez The Engineer)
- Darısı Başına (2022)
- Şapşal Diss (2022)
- Istanbul (2022) (ft. Downtown Dion, Harry Fraud)
- Born Ready (64 Bars) (2022) (ft. GOKO!)
- 8+1 (2022) (ft. Keskin)
- ÜSTÜNDE NE VAR (2021) (ft. Kozmos)
- SUÇ (2021) (ft. Kimera)
- Hiç Uğraşma (2021)
- ANTEN FREESTYLE (PLA4 INTRO) (2021)
- Sis (2021) (ft. Bixi Blake)
- lil şam (Alayına diss) (2021)
- WAVE GODS (2021) (ft. Young Bego)
- RedKeyGang La Familia 2 (2020) (RedKeys Music Album)
- TATTOO (2020) (ft. Zen-G)
- Hennessy (2020) (ft. Ceg)
- Sence Neden (2020) (ft. Bixi Blake, Young Bego, Metth, KÖK$VL)
- Zengin (2020)
- Fight Kulüp 2 (2020) (ft. Killa Hakan, Massaka, Summer Cem, Contra, Anıl Piyancı)
- Bang Bang (2020) (ft. Killa Hakan)
- Kavga (2020) (ft. uuR)
- Yaratık (2020) (ft. Corr)
- Umrumda Değil (2020) (ft. Kozmos)
- 1M FREESTYLE (2019)
- Yolumuz Yol Değil (2019) (ft. Lil Zey)
- Nothin' Can Do About It (2019)
- Gelemem (2019) (ft. Grogi)
- Fuego (2019) (ft. Furkan Karakılıç)
- RMW (2019) (ft. Fornicras)
- METFLIX (2019) (ft. Metth)
- Geldiğim Yer (2019)
- Sar Başa (Original film music) (2019)
- Beamer Boi (ft. Myndless Grimes) (2019)
- Altın Diş (2019)
- RDKYSZN FREESTYLE (2019)
- JENGA (2019) (ft. Ben Fero)
- Görmedin Böylesini (2019) (ft. Keişan)
- Güzelce (2019) (ft. Deli Mi Ne?)
- Legal (2018)
- Para Vermem (2018) (ft. Metth)
- Çıktığım İlk Gün (2018)
- Saçkolik Adam (2018) (ft. SaçkolikAdam)
- Yok Ötesi (2018) (ft. Young Bego, Metth, Tahribad-ı İsyan, Emza, Emcey & Kasetcalar)
- Kime Ne (2018)
- Hiçbir Şeyim Yok (2017)
- Mutfak I (ft. Young Bego) (2017)
- Mutfak II (ft. Young Bego) (2017)
- Karma (ft. Bixi Blake) (2016)
- Hakettiğimi Ver (ft. Metth) (2015)
- Yeah Yeah (2015)
- Circle (2013)

== Filmography ==
Year	Title	Role	Ref.
2019	Sar Başa	Khontkar	
2023	Ayak İşleri	Khontkar	

== Awards and nominations ==
Year	Award	Category	Result	Ref.
2020	17th Radio Boğaziçi Awards	Best Duet (JENGA ft. Ben Fero)	(TBA)	
2020	17th Radyo Boğaziçi Awards	Best Rap/Hip Hop Artist	(TBA)	
2020	46th Golden Butterfly Awards	Best Rapper	Nominated	
