= Kayra (rapper) =

- Also known as: Zapkinus; Mori de Zappa; Kayra of Gına
- Born: Onur İnal; 9 August 1985 (age 41); Karabük, Turkey
- Genres: Storytelling rap; hip hop; protest rap (formerly)
- Occupations: Rapper; lyricist; teacher
- Years active: 2005–present
- Labels: Deadly Habits Music (2013–2021); Below System Records (2016-2021); Pasaj Müzik; Somilk
- Formerly of: Farazi V Kayra; 90bpm; Gına

Onur İnal (born 9 August 1985), better known by his stage name Kayra, is a Turkish rapper, lyricist and English teacher, best known for his work with the hip hop group Farazi V Kayra and the album Hayalet Islığı.

He was a member of the Farazi V Kayra group, which he founded with Burak Demir, disbanded on 31 March 2021. He was also a member of the 90BPM collective until its disbandment in 2020. Kayra is regarded as one of the leading Turkish rappers known for his storytelling, with lyrics often characterised by realistic and relatable narratives. His songs frequently reference everyday life, politics, football, the city of Karabük, and Turkish culture. He describes both himself and his music as moody and pessimistic.

== Career ==
=== 2007–2015: Gına, Farazi V Kayra, Sarhoş Palavraları ve Bekar Evinde Kör Sinekler and Hayalet Islığı ===
He started his career with the group Gına, which he founded with his beatmaker friend Bitap in 2003. The group gained recognition in the underground hip hop community with the album Ars Moriendi in 2006, followed by Doğum Lekesi and İfade Derdi in 2007. Gına eventually disbanded after Bitap got married and started a family. In 2007, Kayra met another beatmaker, Farazi, at Hiphoplife's "Freestyle King 2007" event. The two subsequently formed the duo Farazi V Kayra.

In 2007 the duo released their debut album Sarhoş Palavraları ve Nahoş Nidalar, which had been completed over four months. It was recorded at Zemin Kat Records in Karabük, and the mixing of the album was done by Bitap, who also performed the scratches for the songs titled Muhterem Hayalet, Kül Yutmaz and Düş peşindeyim; Düş peşime. Emrah Çıldır created the album's cover art and design. Kayra wrote the lyrics, while Farazi produced the tracks.

In 2008, Farazi V Kayra released their second album Sarhoş Palavraları ve Bekar Evinde Kör Sinekler, lyrics of the songs in this album were written by Kayra, and the tracks in the album were produced by Bitap. It consists of 7 tracks: Makus Talihim, Şevket Hamdi Tan, Klozetin Tepesinde Hayat Muhasebesi, Horoz Dövüşlerinde Kanlı Çizmeler, Konulu Pornoda Figüran, Bir Günlük Öldürün Beni and Kuşluk Vakti Balgamı. The song Bir Günlük Öldürün Beni, contains samples of Mevsim Sonbahar by Metro and the song Tortu contains samples of Marianne Faithfull's There Is a Ghost. A fictional character was created for the album as well, named "Şevket Hamdi Tan" who is described in the track of the same name as the editor-in-chief of the Turkish newspaper Bulvar. Emrah Çıldır created the album's cover art and design.

In 2009, the duo released the single Mart for the various-artists compilation Hiphoplife Mixtapes Vol. 1 – Nafile.

On 20 November 2010, the duo released the EP Yerel Radyo. The tracks had originally been prepared for a full-length album, but delays caused by Kayra's military service led them to be released in mixtape format. The mixtape runs for approximately 20 minutes. Kayra wrote the lyrics, Farazi produced the instrumentals and was responsible for the mixing, cover art, and design, while Bitap arranged the vocals. The opening track, Ölmez, is omitted from the track listing because it consists only of a two- to three-second excerpt from the Turkish television drama Bizimkiler. The excerpt is taken when the character Cemil, a social alcoholic, is taken to the hospital for treatment against his will. The words spoken by him are: "Cemil's don't die, they don't die.

On 22 July 2011, Farazi V Kayra released the single Alt Geçit, for the various artists themed compilation album Organize Oluyoruz 1. Bedirhan Karakurluk directed the song's music video, which was filmed in Karabük and contains numerous references to the city and Karabükspor in the single. The single was later remixed by Farazi in March 2017. In Kayra's track Arafta Bile on the "Kayıp Gölgeler" EP released in April 2020, he makes a reference to Alt Geçit and complains about the process of 'a little patience' still continuing, its endlessness, and defeat.

On 28 December 2011, Farazi V Kayra released the single Mertel Kasetçilik, named after a cassette shop in the Bedesten Bazaar in Karabük. In the song, Kayra pays tribute to the Turkish rappers and rap groups he listened to and admired in his youth, including Karakan (band), Nefret (band), Microphone Mafia, Silahsız Kuvvet, Fuat, Ceza, Cartel and many more. The music video for the song was directed by Bedirhan Karakurluk.

On 1 May 2012, Kayra released the five-track EP Saray Yakan Soytarı with DJ Argub. Vinyl Obscura produced the tracks, and Kayra wrote the lyrics.

In 2013, Kayra founded the rap group 90BPM together with Da Poet, Farazi, Savai and Sorgu.

On 16 July 2013, Kayra released the single Mesela Yani, which was inspired by and contains quotations from the 1979 film Korkusuz Korkak, in which Kemal Sunal played the character Mülayim. CanBeatz produced the song, and Kayra wrote the lyrics.

On 24 May 2014, Farazi V Kayra released the single Natuk Baytan, which references films made by the renowned Yeşilçam director Natuk Baytan, especially in the late 70s and 80s.

On 29 November 2014, Kayra and Sorgu released the five-track EP Gitmedim Ama İçinden Geçtim. The tracks were produced by Badmixday, Beatific Vision, Can Kazaz, Farazi, and Yüce Ceylanlı, while the lyrics were written by Kamufle, Kayra, Kodes Kahra, Da Poet, and Sorgu. It was released under the Deadly Habits Music music label. The line "I read this beat to the vivid memories, I wish I could make her listen to it (this) like she always wanted," written by Sorgu in the EP's track Tereddüt, refers to his late mother.

In October 2014, 90BPM launched the Aydabir project, under which the group planned to release a song every month. The project ended in January 2015, with only four singles released: Rahat Bırak Beni, Gafil, Tutmayan Kuponlarım Var 2.0 and Zürafa Tekmesi.

On 14 February 2015, Farazi V Kayra released Sarhoş Palavraları ve İbretlik Hikayeler, the duo's third album and the final album in the Sarhoş Palavraları series. The album consists of six tracks: Boşla Oltayı Al Voltayı, Bilemiyorum Altan, Güfte, Paran Bende, Ne Yapacağını Bilen Var mı? and Belana Koşar Adım. Lyrics were written by Kayra, Da Poet and Sorgu, with vocals performed by Kayra, Da Poet, Sorgu and Savai. Da Poet performed the scratches, Sorgu handled the mixing, and the cover photograph was taken by Gizem Kokuroğlu.

On 14 May 2015, Kayra released his first solo EP, Mucizeye Bir Hafta. The EP focuses on Karabükspor's relegation battle in the 1. Lig in the 1993–94 season. The five-track EP depicts the excitement of the fans and the disappointment they experienced after the result of the relegation battle. The "miracle" in the album's title refers to Karabükspor's unexpected defeat in the last minutes of the season's last match, resulting in their unexpected relegation from the league. The tracks were featured in the documentary "15mayıs94: The day when the city fell into silence". The tracks in the album were produced by Farazi, Da Poet and Vinyl Obscura.

On 29 March 2015, Farazi V Kayra released the single Tutmayan Kuponlarım Var. The single has samples of Queen Esther Marrow's Peaceful Man and contains an excerpt from Sadri Alışık's film, Serseri.

On 24 July 2015, 90BPM released the album Kötülük Bizim İşimiz (English: Evil Is Our Business). The album's tracks were produced by Badmixday, Group Ses Beats, Da Poet, Farazi, Savai, and Sami Baha. The lyrics were written by 9 Canlı, Ağaçkakan, Allame, Ezhel, Kamufle, Kayra, Da Poet, Sahtiyan and Sorgu. The album also features guest appearances by 9 Canlı, Ağaçkakan, Allame, Badmixday, Ezhel, Grup Ses Beats, Kamufle, Sahtiyan & Sami Baha. The cover of the album is a picture of Savai's car, a Renault 12. According to Da Poet, the car symbolizes a journey in a metaphorical sense. Kayra defines the name of the album with these words:

This album's name comes from a drawing of my neighbour's child sitting by himself one summer day. The humorous part or the part of the work that attracted us is that this child we are talking about is very independent, does not even choose food, does not obey his parents. Although he is a good child in every aspect of life, he draws something so strange and writes ‘Evil is Our Business’ under it. We were impressed by this. This attracted us a lot. Actually, there is nothing very evil. We were attracted by this thought of a child who thinks that he only does evil things, who perceives those little things as evil in his own way. When we got into the studio, it seemed like an evil in our own way that we were completely detached from the outside world, our own world, our own place where we belonged, feeling very free. But there is no evil.

==== Hayalet Islığı ====
On 13 September 2013, Farazi V Kayra released its fourth album Hayalet Islığı, consisting of 15 tracks; Dokunmayarayaparsın, Cenaze I: Ölüler Konuşamaz, Cenaze II: Kolonya, Cenaze III: Merhumun Çalıntı Gölgesi, Mevsim Olmayan Mekanlar I: Fotoğraflarda Ölümü Görüyorum, Mevsim Olmayan Mekanlar II: Ayaz Meyhanesi, Mevsim Olmayan Mekanlar III: (Bir) Fotoğrafın Rüyası, Mevsim Olmayan Mekanlar IV: Bir Eve Hangi Gün Gidilmez, Mevsim Olmayan Mekanlar V: Unutulanlar, Mevsim Olmayan Mekanlar VI: Kar, Vakitsiz, Yangın I: Sakin, Yangın II: Sandığımdan Herkes Babam Gibi Gülecek, Yangın III: 15 Eylül 1966 and Dobro Vecer. Farazi and Kayra were accompanied by Karaçalı, Da Poet, Sorgu, Ağaçkakan and Type Wheel on vocals and Vinyl Obscura on scratches. The instrumentals for two tracks on the album; Merhumun Çalıntı Gölgesi and Ayaz Meyhanesi were produced jointly by Farazi and Savai. Kupa-A mixed Kolonya and (Bir) Fotoğrafın Rüyası, while Sorgu mixed the remaining tracks. The album is divided into three sections: Cenaze, Mevsim Olmayan Mekanlar and Yangın. Across the album, Kayra tells the story of someone who has lost a close friend in a fire.

The Cenaze (lit. funeral in Turkish) section of the album consists of three main tracks and centres on the death, which is also revisited at various points throughout the album. This section addresses the denial experienced by someone who has lost a loved one. This is suggested by Kayra's line, “What are these halvahs for?”, which implies that he has not accepted the death and refers to the tradition of distributing halvah at funerals.

In the album's second section, Mevsim Olmayan Mekanlar (English: Unseasonal Spaces), which consists of six tracks, Kayra comes to accept the reality of death. In the first track of this section, Fotoğraflarda Ölümü Görüyorum (lit. I see death in pictures in Turkish) Kayra does not deliver lyrics, although his vocals are still present. The dialogue used in the track is taken from the 1992 film Gölge Oyunu. Kayra pays his respects to Uğur Kaymaz, with the line "When the whitest snow falls, good luck will come, when the whitest snow falls, Uğur will wake up and come" a 12-year-old boy who was killed alongside his father Ahmet Kaymaz in front of their house in Kızıltepe district of Mardin on 21 November 2004 by a barrage of police fire, this interpretation is supported by the following line in the song: "Don't stop for a minute and shoot me in the name of the law" in the only protest song in the album; Kar, which is also part of this section. Kayra also refers to children killed by the state in the same song with the lyric "I've only got one pair of hands, so slaughter children". This section also contains the most prominent song of the album, Unutulanlar (lit. the forgotten in Turkish), in which the sample from Nina Simone's I Hold No Grudge, which was also covered by the jazz-rock band Joy Unlimited, was used. The song talks about someone whom the narrator resents for unspecified reasons but against whom they nevertheless hold no grudge. The opening lyrics, "I wonder who you are? (Who?) Who is the host of the funeral?", indicate whom the song addresses. The lines "Sit down, take a breath, you still have a long way to go" and "I won't leave you even if they cut you, you're my guest" directly address the person for whom the song was written. The song also emphasises that this person acted unscrupulously towards those they left behind and is consumed by hatred.

In the album's third and final section, Yangın (English: Fire), the narrator searches for the cause of his friend's death and confronts the fire, a central motif that Kayra references in almost every track. This section consists of three tracks; Sakin, Sandığımdan Herkes Babam Gibi Gülecek and 15 Eylül 1966.

The album opens with Dokunmayarayaparsın, while Dobro Vecer (literally “good evening” in Croatian and Bulgarian) contains the hidden track Islığı Beklerken, which begins 40 seconds after Dobro Vecer ends, symbolising the religious tradition of the fortieth ceremony, and closes the album. The song Dobro Vecer sampled from Maria Neykova's single released with the same name in 1972.

The album cover is a childhood photograph of Kayra's father with a friend, taken at Demirçelik High School in Karabük.

=== 2016–present: Hayırsız Evlat, Bütün Ayazların Ortasında, copyright dispute with Farazi and Ömrümün Son Güzel Günleri ===
On 21 November 2016, Kayra and Sycho Gast recorded the song Kaç!, as part of the "Serbest Atış" (Part 4) project with the Deadly Habits Music label. This track (like the others from "Serbest Atış") was completed in 4 hours.

In 2017, Kayra featured on the track Münnecim on İkra's album Herkes Kadar Kimse.

Along with Joker, Server Uraz, Da Poet, Kamufle and Tankurt Manas, Kayra featured on the protest track Hani Nerdeler (Remix) released by Lewo on 18 August 2017.

On 8 July 2018, Kayra released the single Hayırsız Evlat (English: Undutiful Child), produced by Erdem Sonkaya who is better known by his stage name Radansa. The song contains samples from Roberto Carlos's song Nuestro Amor.

On 25 January 2019, Kayra released the first part of the Bütün Ayazların Ortasında album consisting of three songs: Yol, Çok Yaşlıyım and Kafamda Cehennem with a music video being made for Kafamda Cehennem.

On 22 March 2019, Kayra released the second part of the Bütün Ayazların Ortasında album consisting of three songs: Olmadım Say, Kül Kalır and Dişçi Koltuğu with a music video being made for Olmadım Say.

On 24 May 2019, Kayra released the complete album Bütün Ayazların Ortasında (English: In the Midst of All Frosts), produced by Beatific Vision, Becrux, Da Poet and Radansa and written by Kayra, Da Poet and Radansa, the album follows a continuous narrative centred on the character Veysel, voiced by Kayra in the skits. The album has a dark tone and explores everyday difficulties, including family problems, toothache, and foreclosure, as well as the emotions these experiences evoke. Although most of the album consists of solo tracks, Kayra is joined by Da Poet on Kül Kalır and Karaçalı on Felaketimi Beklerken. Three songs in the album have music videos, Olmadım Say, Öfkemin Şafağı and Kafamda Cehennem. The album cover features a photograph of Kayra's father on a motorcycle. Both Sızlıyor Kemiklerim and Hayırsız Evlat are directly connected to the album. According to Kayra, Sızlıyor Kemiklerim was one of the songs he wrote while developing the album's initial concept and language. Hayırsız Evlat was also intended for the album, but it was removed as the track list became too long. In 2020, comic book artist Ege Avcı published a comic book adaptation inspired by the album under the Baobab label and the album's original title.

On 20 December 2019, Kayra released the EP Bütün Ayazların Ardından - Single (English: After All Frosts - Single), consisting of two songs: Kara Leke and Pazar Yeri. Both songs were produced by Fonetik.

On 24 April 2020, Kayra released the EP Kayıp Gölgeler, consisting of four songs: Arafta Bile, CM 01-02, Beyoğlu, and Köprüaltı Kemancı. Kayra is accompanied by Barış Demirel on Beyoğlu. Tracks in the album were produced by Batubomaye and Da Poet.

On 31 March 2021, a dispute broke out between the duo, and Farazi removed their albums and singles from music streaming services. The dispute concerned copyright issues. Farazi claimed that he had not received revenue from albums and singles released under his own production company, Deadly Habits Music. Farazi alleged that Kayra had collected 86,000 Turkish liras without informing him or sharing the money with him. Kayra denied Farazi's allegations, stating that he had not received the royalties he was owed since 2013. Kayra said that Farazi had broken his promises, failed to release his albums, and exploited him and his rights. He also stated that he had filed a lawsuit against Farazi. Kayra further claimed that he had handled everything himself and that Farazi had made no effort to help him with Farazi V Kayra.

On 10 June 2022, Kayra released the 11-track album Meçhul Bir Yalnızlığa Dair, on which he collaborates with various artists. The album mainly explores Kayra's student years in Ankara between the ages of 18 and 22. He is accompanied by A-Bacchus on Muhtemel Son, Yeryüzünde Bir Akşam, Ölüm Bugün Uyu, Duymuyor Beni Ankara, SaklıKent, En Ölü Rockstar, Mutsuzlar Güzel Güler and Rezil ve Yalnız, by Fonetik on İçimdeki Yasal Boşluklar, Onlar Şehre Dönecek Bir Akşam and Fotoğraftaki Herkes Gitti. Fonetik and A-Bacchus produced the album's tracks.

On 14 April 2023, Kayra released the six-track EP Cehennem Kundaklayanlar with A-Bacchus and Vinyl Obscura. The track list comprises Rifle, Hırs, Cehennemden Manzaralar, Wicked, Kimin İçin and Bağırsam Çağırsam. Tracks in the EP were produced by A-Bacchus and Vinyl Obscura.

On 20 October 2023, Kayra released the album Ömrümün Son Güzel Günleri. Tracks in the album were produced by A-Bacchus and Fonetik. He is accompanied by Yiğit Seferoğlu on the song Bu Kaçıncı İsyan, by Fredd on the song Katil Gramafon and by Doruk Ereşter on the song Küçük Şehirlerde Trajik Tesadüfler in this album.

On 12 April 2024, Kayra and Da Poet released the album NORMAL, consisting of nine songs, it includes collaborations with artists like Ceza, Defkhan, No.1, and İdil Meşe. The deluxe version, released on January 17, 2025, adds two new tracks; Kalamam Aranızda featuring Deniz Tekin and Önemi Yok, along with instrumental versions.

On 14 February 2025, Kayra released the EP Ölüler Parkı Fanzin, consisting of five songs: Vicdan Azabı, Basit Birer Tesadüf, Muazzam Hatalar, Ne Olmaz İhtimal and Beni Ölüler Gayet İyi Bilir. Songs in the album were produced by A-Bacchus and Fonetik. On 18 July 2025, Kayra released the EP Kaos Parkı Fanzin, which consists of five tracks. On 9 August, he released the two-track single Doğuştan Yabancı, followed by the single 9:10 on 12 September. On 12 December 2025, he released another five-track EP, Yaşasın Hayat Parkı Fanzin, featuring collaborations with Aspi and Vinyl Obscura on the track Kanlı Bir Bandana.

On 2 October 2026, Kayra released the four-track EP KOZ: Nagra SN.

== Personal life ==
He teaches English at Akçakonak Primary School in Aydın, Söke. He is a supporter of Karabükspor and is married. He played the lead role in the 2017 short film C.O.D.

In 2003, he was admitted to the English Language and Literature Department of Hacettepe University and moved to Ankara in order to continue his education, later moving to Istanbul 6 years after in 2009.

== Aliases ==
=== Kayra ===
According to Kayra himself, he chose Kayra as his pseudonym due to the influence of Hakan Günday's novel Kinyas ve Kayra, a novel he read at 19 years old, he also stated that if he knew then when he knows now he would have chosen Kinyas instead.

=== Zapkinus ===
Kayra explains the meaning of Zapkinus with these words:

In the film Destiny, one character called the other ‘Here you go, Zapkinus’ in one scene. I thought it was very funny to call someone Zapkinus. For this reason, I use it in various places, but Zapkinus is not a musical identity.

=== Mori de Zappa ===
Although Kayra has never produced anything with this pseudonym, at the beginning of the song Kanlı Karnaval, Kayra shouts 'Kayra Mori de Zappa".

== Discography ==
=== Albums ===
- Gına - Ars Moriendi (2006)
- Gına - Doğum Lekesi (2007)
- Gına - İfade Derdi (2007)
- Farazi V Kayra - Sarhoş Palavraları ve Nahoş Nidalar (2007)
- Farazi V Kayra - Sarhoş Palavraları ve Bekar Evinde Kör Sinekler (2008)
- Farazi V Kayra - Yerel Radyo EP (2010)
- Farazi V Kayra - Hayalet Islığı (2013)
- Farazi V Kayra - Sarhoş Palavraları ve İbretlik Hikayeler (2015)
- Bütün Ayazların Ortasında (2019)
- Meçhul Bir Yalnızlığa Dair (2022)
- Ömrümün Son Güzel Günleri (2023)
- Da Poet & Kayra - Normal (2024)
- Da Poet & Kayra - Normal Deluxe (2025)

=== EPs ===
- Gına - Inziva (2005)
- Saray Yakan Soytarı (2012)
- Gitmedim Ama İçinden Geçtim (2014)
- Mucizeye Bir Hafta (2015)
- Kayıp Gölgeler (2020)
- Cehennem Kundaklayanlar (2023)
- Ölüler Parkı Fanzin (2025)
- Kaos Parkı Fanzin (2025)
- Yaşasın Hayat Parkı Fanzin (2025)
- KOZ: Nagra SN (2026)

=== Singles ===
- Farazi V Kayra - "Alt Geçit" (2011)
- Farazi V Kayra - "Mertel Kasetçilik" (2011)
- "Mesela Yani" (2013)
- Farazi V Kayra - "Tutmayan Kuponlarım Var" (2015)
- "Kaç!" (2016)
- "Hayırsız Evlat" (2018)
- "Şehrin Hayaleti" (2019)
- "Karartma Enseyi" (2020)
- "Geceye Varınca" (2021)
- "Kanlı Karnaval" (2021)
- "Her Yerde Hiçbir Şey" (2021)
- "Haziranda Vurulmak" (2021)
- "Muhtemel Son" (2022)
- "Duymuyor Beni Ankara" (2022)
- "Gidin Başımdan" (2022)
- "Manifest" (2022)
- "Geçit Yok" (2022)
- "Buz Kesene Kadar" (2023)
- "Uzak" (2023)
- "Karışsın Kanla Yağmur" (2023)
- Deniz Tekin, Da Poet & Kayra - "Kalamam Aranızda" (2024)
- Da Poet & Kayra - "Önemi Yok" (2025)
- "Basit Birer Tesadüf" (2025)
- "Doğuştan Yabancı" (2025)
- Çağrı Sinci & Kayra - "Heykelin Kesik Bacakları" (2025)
- "9:10" (2025)
- Çağrı Sinci & Kayra - "Cambaza Bak" (2025)
- İmpala & Kayra - "Cehennemde Bi Gölge" (2025)
- Hazar Altın & Kayra - "Erkek Adam Ağlamazmış" (2025)
- "60 Seconds Freestyle" (2026)
