= Bosnak =

Bosnak (Turkish-language variant: Boşnak) is an ethnonymic surname literally meaning "Bosnian person". Notable people with the surname include:

- Kaan Boşnak
- Karyn Bosnak
- Metin Boşnak
- Robert Bosnak

== See also ==
- Boşnak Derviş Mehmed Pasha
- Boşnak Hüsrev Pasha
- Boşnak Mustafa Paşa
- Boşnak Osman Paşa
