= Anıl Piyancı =

Turkish rapper, musician and songwriter (born 1990)

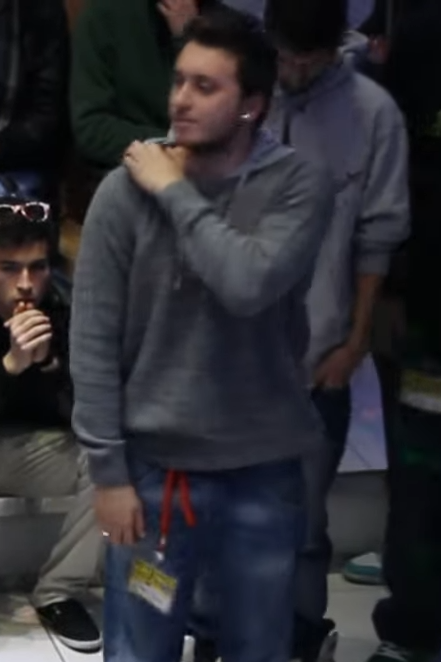
- Piyancı in 2014

Background information
- Born: 17 July 1990 (age 36); Karşıyaka, İzmir, Turkey
- Origin: Turkey
- Genres: Hip hop; trap
- Occupations: Rapper; singer; songwriter
- Years active: 2007–present
- Labels: Dokuz Sekiz; Universal; Yeşil Oda; Sony

Anıl Piyancı (born 17 July 1990) is a Turkish rapper, singer and songwriter.

== Career ==
He started his career at the age of 16 by founding his studio "Yeşil Oda". Piyancı started making hip hop music in 2010 and was featured in Ezhel's song Sekiz in 2011. His breakthrough came in May 2014 with the song Bi Duman Hip-Hop which was published on YouTube. The song was well received by the audience and soon products and T-shirts branded with the song's title were produced and sold.

In 2019, he voiced an acoustic version of the song "Bırakman Doğru mu?" together with Zeynep Bastık. The song was among the most-listened songs on Spotify in Turkey in 2019. In the same year, he prepared a number of songs for different commercials. In 2020, he was given the Best Debut by a Rapper award at the Stars of Music Awards, which is organized by MüzikOnAir and Bahçeşehir University Radio. In the same year, he signed a contract with Universal Müzik Production.

== Discography ==
=== Albums ===
| Year | Title | Label |
|---|---|---|
| 2010 | Popüler Konvoy | |
| 2012 | Sandığın Gibi Değil | |
| 2013 | Zaman Yok | Yeşil Oda Yapım |
| 2015 | Action (ft. Emrah Karakuyu) | Dokuz Sekiz Müzik |
| 2016 | Batı Yakası | Yeşil Oda Yapım |
| 2018 | Yerden Yüksek (ft. Contra) | Yeşil Oda Yapım & ContravoltaMusic |
| 2021 | İzmir | Yeşil Oda Yapım & Universal Müzik Yapım |
| 2022 | 12 (ft. Keişan) | Sony Music |
| 2023 | 23 | Sony Music |
| 2025 | Paradigma | Sony Music |

=== Singles ===
| Year | Title | Label |
|---|---|---|
| 2011 | Eşitsizlik | |
| 2014 | Herkes Doğru (ft. Sansar Salvo) | Dokuz Sekiz Müzik |
| 2015 | Derin Nefes Al (ft. Keişan) | Yeşil Oda Yapım |
| 2015 | Müzik Ve Hayaller | Yeşil Oda Yapım |
| 2016 | Boşver | Yeşil Oda Yapım |
| 2017 | Palavra | Yeşil Oda Yapım |
| 2017 | Hile | Yeşil Oda Yapım |
| 2018 | Profesör | Yeşil Oda Yapım |
| 2018 | Sorun Değil (Remix) (ft. Fatih Aslancan) | Yeşil Oda Yapım |
| 2018 | Tavşan (ft. Contra) | Yeşil Oda Yapım |
| 2018 | KAFA10 (ft. Ezhel) | Yeşil Oda Yapım |
| 2019 | Mercedes (Merco Remix) (ft. Eno) | Alles oder Nix Records |
| 2019 | Saldır Saldır | Yeşil Oda Yapım |
| 2019 | Şöhretin Basamakları | Yeşil Oda Yapım |
| 2019 | Son Bi Gece Daha | Yeşil Oda Yapım |
| 2019 | Varsın (ft. Kaan Boşnak) | Basemode Records, Sony Music |
| 2019 | Ne Bakıyon Dayı Dayı (ft. Keişan) | Dokuz Sekiz Müzik |
| 2019 | Bırakman Doğru Mu (ft. Zeynep Bastık) | Yeşil Oda Yapım |
| 2019 | Bazı Zamanlar | Yeşil Oda Yapım |
| 2019 | Arabaya Bin (ft. Kodes, Sansar Salvo, Nomad, Kubilay Karça) | DMC |
| 2019 | Kapalı Zindanlara | Pump Kreatif |
| 2020 | Ex Arıyor (ft. Kozmos) | Basemode Records & Sony Music |
| 2020 | Yeşillendir (ft. Ceg) | Whitechapel Music & Yeşil Oda Yapım |
| 2020 | Yağmurlar (ft. Perdenin Ardındakiler) | Yeşil Oda Yapım |
| 2020 | Limit Yok (ft. Ezhel, Patron, Sansar Salvo, Allâme, Kamufle, Beta, Pit10) | Ares |
| 2020 | Sıkı Dur (ft. Ben Fero) | Yeşil Oda Yapım |
| 2020 | En Büyüğü (ft. Dianz) | Yeşil Oda Yapım |
| 2020 | Aklımı Kaçırdım | EMI & Universal Müzik Yapım |
| 2020 | Boş (ft. Maho G & Contra) | EMI & Universal Müzik Yapım |
| 2020 | Döndüm Durdum | EMI & Universal Müzik Yapım |
| 2020 | Yürüyoruz Yana Yana (ft. Emrah Karakuyu) | EMI & Universal Müzik Yapım |
| 2020 | Bırakman Doğru Mu 2 (ft. Zeynep Bastık) | Hypers |
| 2020 | Ölüm ile Yaşam (ft. Cem Adrian) | EMI & Universal Müzik Yapım |
| 2021 | Düş | EMI & Universal Müzik Yapım |
| 2021 | Kâinat (ft. Edis and Ekin Beril) | Universal Müzik Yapım |
| 2021 | Ateşe Verdik | Yeşil Oda Yapım |
| 2021 | Gözlerim Seni Arıyor | Yeşil Oda Yapım |
| 2021 | Sen Olmazsan | Yeşil Oda Yapım |
| 2021 | Ara Bakayım | Sony Music |
| 2021 | Göklerde Süzülürken (ft. Kaan Boşnak) | Sony Music |
| 2022 | Pare Pare (ft. Keişan) | Sony Music |
| 2022 | Taksim (ft. Kaan Boşnak) | Sony Music |
| 2022 | Kuşku (ft. Keişan) | Sony Music |
| 2022 | Vay Be | Yeşil Oda Yapım |
| 2022 | Baba Parası | Yeşil Oda Yapım |
| 2022 | S.S.D | Yeşil Oda Yapım |
| 2022 | L.O | Yeşil Oda Yapım |
| 2022 | Karma (ft. Ece Seçkin & Genco Ecer) | DMC |
| 2022 | Gece Modu | Yeşil Oda Yapım |
| 2023 | Adios Amigo (ft. Myko) | ILS Vision Music |
| 2023 | Boğar Beni Gündüz (ft. Mâi) | Sony Music |
| 2023 | Üstümde Tütüyo Duman | Sony Music |
| 2023 | Sıkıcı Bahaneler (ft. Ceren Devrim) | Sony Music |
| 2023 | Kalmadı Tadım Tuzum (ft. Kaan Boşnak) | Sony Music |
| 2023 | La Turka (ft. Set) | Sony Music |
| 2023 | Gözümün Feri Yok (ft. Nurettin Colak) | Sony Music |
| 2023 | Bana Cevap Ver (ft. Aleyna Kalaycıoğlu) | Sony Music |
| 2023 | Bi Çare Yok Mu? | Sony Music |
| 2023 | Uzayda Aşk | Sony Music |
| 2024 | Yaşıyorum Ölesiye (ft. Sufle & Nurettin Colak) | Sufle Productions |
| 2024 | Kıyamet (ft. Alba) | Apollon Unity |
| 2024 | İstemem İtiraz | Sony Music |
| 2024 | Kirlendi Tüm Duygularım (ft. Şehinşah & Keişan) | Boomers Records |
| 2024 | Şüpheleniyorum (ft. Zeynep Yavuz) | Sony Music |
| 2024 | Nedeni Göremem (ft. Kaan Boşnak) | Sony Music |
| 2024 | Açık Ara Bul Kon | Sinerji |
| 2024 | Ne Saçma Dertlerimiz Var | Sony Music |
| 2024 | Baby (Walk And Flow) | Dinazor Dağıtım |
| 2024 | Yeniden Başlar (ft. Anse) | Sony Music |
| 2024 | İçime Düştü Ateş (ft. Aydilge) | Avrupa Müzik |
| 2024 | West Side (ft. Avaz & The Nova) | Sony Music |
| 2024 | İstanbul (ft. Page) | Sony Music |
| 2025 | Yo! Freestyle (ft. Champ Boi & Avaz) | Sony Music |
| 2025 | Güzelim Bu Da Kafa (ft. Champ Boi & Berkay Duman) | Sony Music |
| 2025 | Siren (ft. The Nova) | Sony Music |
| 2025 | Küllerinden Doğ (ft. Colt NS) | Sony Music |
| 2025 | Olmuyor (ft. Kaan Boşnak) | Sony Music |

=== EPs ===
| Year | Title | Label |
|---|---|---|
| 2021 | Parti Modu | Universal Müzik Yapım |
| 2021 | Hisli Flowlar | Universal Müzik Yapım |
| 2021 | En Sevdiğim Flowlar | Universal Müzik Yapım |
| 2021 | Spor Modu | Universal Müzik Yapım |
| 2021 | AP Band Part I (Live) | Yeşil Oda Yapım |
| 2023 | Palm Trap (ft. Set) | Sony Music |
| 2025 | 6EP (ft. Şehinşah & Berkay Duman) | Sony Music |
