= Şehinşah =

- Also known as: HSNSBBH
- Born: Ufuk Yıkılmaz; 27 December 1986 (age 39); Kemah, Erzincan, Turkey
- Genre: Hip hop
- Occupations: Rapper; singer; songwriter
- Years active: 2004–present

Ufuk Yıkılmaz (born 27 December 1986), better known by his stage name Şehinşah and also known as HSNSBBH, is a Turkish rapper, singer and songwriter.

== Life ==
Yıkılmaz was born in Erzincan, Turkey. He started writing lyrics for rap when he was in middle school.

== Discography ==
=== Albums ===
Year	Album	Track no.
2006	HaremeynAlamut	11
2012	Kapatıyoruz Mixtape	15
2016	DEEV (Deluxe Edition)	22
2020	666	10
2024	IKARUS	16

He has also voiced 5 tracks in DJ Artz's İşin Mutfağı album. (2017)

=== Singles and duets ===
- Kapıları Çalan Benim (ft. Şanışer & Karamamba)
- Madafuckin Noise
- Sevgi Ülkesinin İrticacı P*zevenkleri (ft. Karaçalı)
- Sahneyi Terk Edin (ft. Patron)
- Kitle Kiste Mahkum (ft. Saian)
- Cesetten Balyalar (ft. Saian)
- Ne (ft. Saian)
- Biz Evde Yine Bir Gün (ft. Patron & Saian)
- Haşşaşin Marşı
- Şahmeran (ft. Patron)
- Zamanın Doldu (ft. Patron)
- Koca Götüne Vazelin (ft. Patron)
- Kalk (ft. Patron)
- Duygusal Olmaya Gerek Yok (ft. Sansar Salvo)
- İddiali Cümleler Ülkesi
- İsterik Nameler (ft. Playa)
- Tebligat Verin
- Apartman Savaşları
- Amın Amına Koyacan
- Hepsi Benim
- Kötüyüm
- Cannabis (ft. Keişan)
- Doldu Şarjör (ft. Sansar Salvo)
- İstila
- Fame Peşindeki Çocuğun Dramı
- Cehennem Senfoni
- Hiphop Okulu
- Güller & Rhyme
- Hayal (2014)
- Üzülme (2016)
- Karma (2017)
- Islah (ft. Muşta) (2018)
- Şüpheli Şahıs (ft. Şam) (2018)
- Yak Yak Yak (2018)
- Marslı Kadın (2018)
- Boing (2018)
- Milyon (2018)
- Dünya'dan Atlas'a (2018)
- Kıskanç (ft. Kubilay Karça) (2019)
- Pirana (2019)
- Yok Sana (ft. Bossy) (2019)
- Bahaneleriniz (ft. Muşta) (2019)
- Yaz Yağmurum (2019)
- Shredder'ı Krang'in (2019)
- Çocuk (2019)
- Talep-Arz (2019)
- Press (ft. Ati242) (2019)
- İmza (ft. Hidra) (2019)
- Baban (2020)
- Kabul Olmaz Bizim Gibiler (ft. Vio) (2020)
- Trump (HSNSBBH ismiyle) (2020)
- Kunteper (2020)
- Nedeni Var (ft. Helineda) (2020) (from Arda Gezer's Episode 1 album)
- Dön Dünya (ft. Cem Adrian) (2020)
- Darılmak Yok (2020)
- Eksik Olmaz (ft. Atik & Nosta) (2021)
- Samanyolu (2021)
- MATRIX (ft. Spade427) (2021)
- Bi Ona! Bi Buna! (ft. Yazox) (2021)
- KADER (ft. Aspova) (2021)
- Anunakiler (ft. Ati242, Hidra, Lia Shine) (2021)
- The Face of Vision (2021)
- Hadi Yaparsın (2022)
- Diabolico (2022)
- +28 (Tirat) (2022)
- Taktik (ft. Ebru Keskin) (2022)
- Nefret (ft. Arda Gezer & Sali) (2022)
- Yaşamak (ft. Kum) (2022)
- No Risk No Fun (ft. Defkhan & Zmn) (2022)
- Dönmedin Ki (2022)
- Ellerinde (2022)
- 129 (2022)
- Muz Cumhuriyeti (2022)
- High 2 (ft. Hidra) (2023)
- Prenses (2023)
- Fırtına (ft. ERU & Cotard) (2023)
- Prenses (Remix) (ft. Emrah Türken & Cotard) (2023)
- İST/TAKSÎMi (ft. Hidra & Emrah Türken) (2023)
- Galvanize (ft. Cotard) (2023)
- ÖZGÜRMÜBİLİNÇDENEMELERİ3 (prod by: Archie & Emrah Türken) (2023)
- KYOTO/GEISHA (ft. Cotard & Emrah Türken) (2023)
- CimCimem (2023)
- Maymunlar Cehennemi (ft. Cash Flow) (2023)
- Darılmak Yok (2023)
- Canım Babam (2023)
- Hüsran (2023)
- Pembe Yalanlar (ft. 13 Killoki) (2024)
- Phonkfreestyle (ft. Deha Inc., Reckol, 13 Killoki) (2024)
- Kirlendi Tüm Duygularım (ft. Anıl Piyancı, Keişan) (2024)
- Ikarus (2024)
- Daim (2024)
- Sönük Kaldın (ft. Xentix) (2024)
- Ufukmania (2024)
- Deliyoo (ft. Arda Gezer, Patron) (2024)
- Meclis-i Ala (2024)
- Tanrıyı Kıyamete Zorlama (ft. Birand, Auxibeatz) (2024)
- Bana Ne (ft. Zen-G) (2024)
