= Cambaz (song) =

Mor ve Ötesi song

Song by mor ve ötesi

from the album Dünya Yalan Söylüyor
- Language: Turkish
- Released: April 16, 2004
- Genre: Alternative rock, protest
- Length: 4:02
- Label: Pasaj
- Songwriter: Harun Tekin
- Producer: Tarkan Gözübüyük

"Cambaz" is a song featured on the album Dünya Yalan Söylüyor, released by Mor ve Ötesi in 2004. Released as one of the album's lead singles, "Cambaz" was accompanied by a music video. The lyrics were written by Harun Tekin, while the music was composed collectively by the band. The song's opening features Ozan Tügen playing the cümbüş, a fretless string instrument, adding microtonal elements to the arrangement.

== Background ==
In 2003, the United States invaded Iraq, with the support of several allied nations. In Turkey, the country's possible participation in the war was debated in parliament. In March 2003, a motion was submitted to the Grand National Assembly of Turkey proposing to allow U.S. military forces to be stationed on Turkish soil and Turkish troops to enter Iraq. Although pro-government media outlets campaigned in favour of the motion's passage, it was rejected.

== Composition and lyrics ==
Written by Harun Tekin, the song criticizes the media's coverage of the 2003 invasion of Iraq, particularly Habertürk's reporting. The line "Ne habersin, ne Türk'sün" ("You are neither informed nor Turkish") criticizes the channel's reporting and its representation of Turkish interests.

The song's title plays on the words canbaz and cambaz. The former derives from Persian and means "one who plays with their life", while the latter is the Turkish spelling used for "acrobat". The suffix "-baz", found in words such as hokkabaz (conjurer), sihirbaz (magician) and cambaz, refers to someone who plays with something. Tekin explained in an interview that the band chose the spelling cambaz to create a wordplay with cam (glass), referring to the television screen, also known in Turkish as the "white screen".

The lyrics also use the expression afet-i azam, which Tekin said he coined to mean "great catastrophe", referring to the prospect of a wider war. The line "Bütün dünya izler durur" ("The whole world keeps watching") reflects the lack of international action in the face of war and destruction, while the line "Hedefini al, piyasanı al, her şeyi al" ("Take your target, take your market, take everything") criticizes Bush for seeking strategic and economic benefits.

The lines "Kul oldun, köle oldun" ("You became a servant, you became a slave"), "Kurşungeçirmez cam oldun" ("You became bulletproof glass"), "Cin oldun, adam çarptın" ("You became a jinn and tricked people") and "Cellat oldun, kelle uçurdun" ("You became an executioner and beheaded people") portray the media as serving those in power, supporting their interests and discrediting people they oppose.

== Music video ==
The music video of the song, directed by Mahir Akyol, features footage of the aftermath of the bombings that took place during the 2003 invasion of Iraq, excerpts from speeches by then-U.S. President George W. Bush, and footage of celebrations and parades in the United States. The video also includes television screens and studio footage.

== Reception ==
The song became one of Mor ve Ötesi's best-known songs and received considerable radio and television airplay following its release in 2004. In 2005, Mor ve Ötesi won the Best Group award at the Kral TV Video Music Awards, with "Cambaz" listed as the winning entry.

In a 2022 retrospective for Cumhuriyet, critic Emrah Kolukısa described the song as one of the tracks that brought the band to the height of its popularity. Kolukısa praised its opening riff, the use of the cümbüş and the climactic chorus, describing it as a "rock anthem" that remained relevant years after its release.

== Personnel ==
Mor ve Ötesi

- Harun Tekin – vocals, rhythm guitar
- Kerem Kabadayı – drums
- Burak Güven – bass
- Kerem Özyeğen – lead guitar

Additional musician

- Ozan Tügen – keyboards, cümbüş

== Live performances ==
In December 2016, Cem Yılmaz joined the band on stage to perform the song at its 20th-anniversary concert at Zorlu PSM in Istanbul.

Mor ve Ötesi performed "Cambaz" with a symphonic orchestra at Istanbul's Hagia Irene in 2018. The performance was included on the live album Canlı Senfonik – Aya İrini, released in 2019. The band also recorded an acoustic version at Istanbul's historic Sirkeci railway station in November 2018, which was published on its official YouTube channel in April 2020.

In July 2019, Mor ve Ötesi performed "Cambaz" with a symphonic orchestra at the Harbiye Cemil Topuzlu Open-Air Theatre in Istanbul. The recording was released in December 2020 as part of the live album Harbiye Açıkhava (Canlı Senfonik).

== Covers ==
In 2025, at the "Saygı1 Mor ve Ötesi" concert organised by Oğuzhan Uğur, Dolu Kadehi Ters Tut performed a cover of the song.

== See also ==
- List of anti-war songs
