= Kubilay Karça =

Turkish rapper

- Born: 1996 (age 29–30); Eskişehir, Turkey
- Origin: Turkey
- Genre: Hip hop
- Occupations: Rapper; singer; songwriter
- Years active: 2018–present
- Label: Wovie

Kubilay Karça (born 1996) is a Turkish rapper, singer and songwriter. He began his career with a single named "Kumpas". He has collaborated on a lot of projects with Sansar Salvo, Şehinşah, Anıl Piyancı, Allâme and Feride Hilal Akın.

== Discography ==
=== Albums ===
- Cehennem Ateşi (2019)
- Mücevher (2019)
- Gökten Düştüm (2020)

=== Singles ===
- "Kumpas"
- "Kıskanç" (feat. Şehinşah)
- "Daha Yeni Başladı" (feat. Berk Coşkun)
- "Eyvallah" (feat. Abdurrahman Şimşek)
- "Şeytan" (feat. Rona Say)
- "Uzak"
- "Bana Gel" (feat. Rona Say)
- "Başımda Belalar" (feat. Tuğrul Bektaş)
- "Duman"
- "S.O.S" (feat. MobBeatz)
- "Konuma Gerek Yok"
- "Yarınım Yok" (feat. Allâme)
