= Contra (rapper) =

Turkish rapper and songwriter

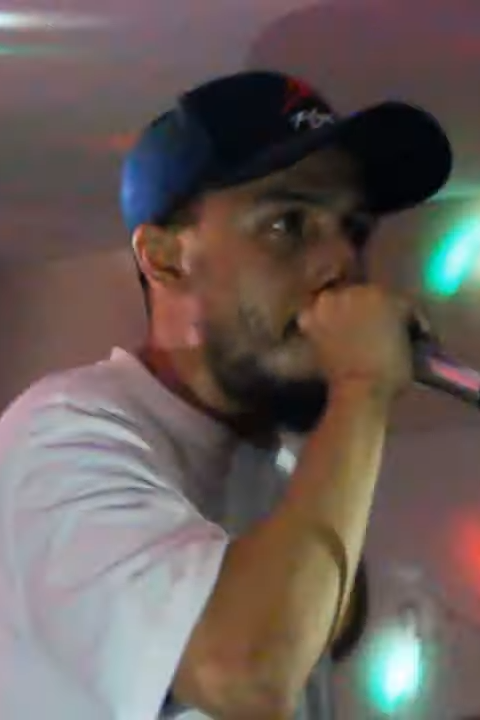
- Contra in 2015

Background information
- Born: Çağdaş Terzi; 23 October 1988 (age 37); Istanbul, Turkey
- Genre: Hip hop
- Occupations: Rapper; singer; songwriter
- Years active: 2004–present

Çağdaş Terzi (born 23 October 1989), better known by his stage name Contra, is a Turkish rapper, singer and songwriter. He began his musical career with an album named ‘’Eleştiri’’. He became popular for the song ‘’Ölü’’ in his album ‘’İnanılmaz’’ . In 2017 he released another single named "Ters Yön". The single was deleted from all the platforms for a while, but it’s back now. In 2019 he released his new single, titled "Zebani", in which he criticized journalist Yılmaz Özdil.

== Discography ==
Studio albums

- Zaman Alevi (2006)
- Eleştiri (ft. Orking) (2008)
- Clicktape (ft. Sensei) (2008)
- ContraVolta (2008)
- Understar (2009)
- Personel harici giremez (ft. İtaat) (2010)
- Siyah (2011)
- İnanılmaza Doğru (2011)
- İnanılmaz (Unbelievable) (2012)
- Hitz En Şitz (2015)
- YERDEN YÜKSEK (ft. Anıl Piyancı) (2018)

Singles

- "Ölü" (2012)
- "Zamanda Yolculuk" (2012)
- "Ötesi" (2013)
- "Çivi" (2015)
- "Zyon" (2015)
- "Tehlikeli" (2015)
- "Efsane" (2015)
- "Böyle" (ft. Mister Gang, Orking) (2016)
- "Mahkum" (2016)
- "Kibir" (2018)
- "Tavşan" (ft. Anıl Piyancı) (2018)
- "Zebani" (2019)
- "Hayırlar Ola" (2019)
- "Bir Yana" (2019)
- "kan sahibi" (2020)
- "kıvılcım" (2020)
- "RUH" (ft. Kamufle, Mali Green) (2020)
- "Boş" (ft. Anıl Piyancı, Maho G) (2020)
- "Islak Kum" (2020)
- "GİTTİN GİDELİ" (ft. Timu322) (2021)
- "Sushi" (ft. Anıl Piyancı) (2021)
- "Ücra" (ft. Emrah Karakuyu) (2021)
- "Duvar" (ft. Timu322 & Cenko) (2021)
- "Buz Sarkıtı" (ft. Konuya Fransız) (2021)
- "Bi' Şarkı" (ft. Tanerman) (2021)
- "Afaki" (2022)
- "Dilenci Yrraa" (2022)
- "Benden Bil" (2022)
