= Aydilge =

Turkish writer, poet and singer (born 1979)

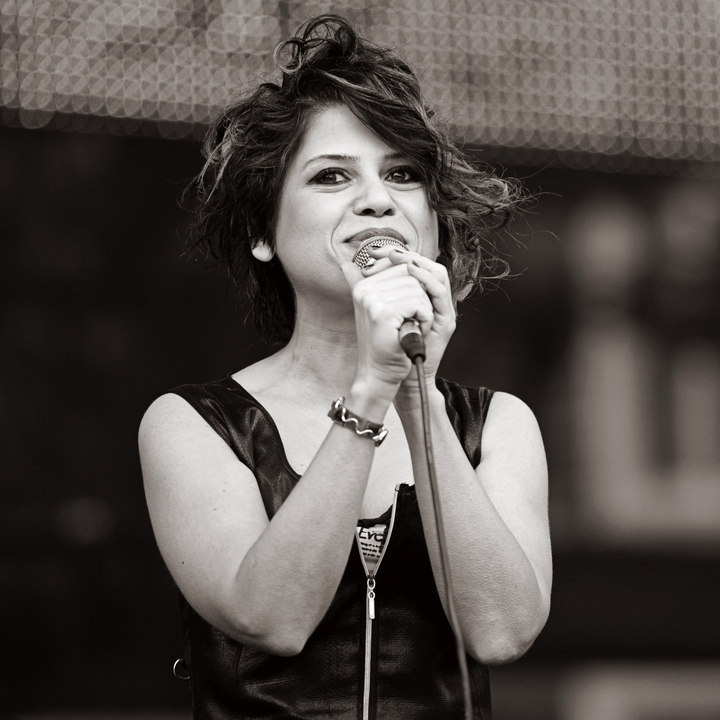
- Aydilge in 2012
- Born: Aydilge Sarp; June 25, 1979 (age 46); Kütahya, Turkey
- Occupations: Singer-songwriter, writer, radio programmer
- Years active: 1998–present
- Spouse: Utku Barış Andaç (m. 2018)
- Musical career
- Genres: Pop rock
- Labels: Dokuz Sekiz; Avrupa
- Website: aydilge.net

Aydilge Sarp (born June 25, 1979) is a Turkish writer, poet and singer-songwriter.

== Biography ==
Aydilge Sarp was born in 1979 in Kütahya, Turkey. Her Circassian mother, Faika Özer writes poetry and novels, with a release of more than ten books. Aydilge passed the entrance exam to the TRT Radio Children's Choir (TRT Radyosu Çocuk Korusu) when she was eight years old. At the age of 14 she was given her first electric guitar and started composing her own songs. Later she performed in bars while she attended secondary school at Türk Eğitim Derneği Ankara Koleji. After having completed her studies of American Culture and Literature in Başkent University in Ankara Aydilge moved to Istanbul where she studied Radio, Television and Cinema at Istanbul University.

== Writer ==
Aydilge published her first volume of short stories in 1998 under the title Kalemimin Ucundaki Düşler (Thoughts From My Pen). Her first novel, Bulimia Sokağı (Bulemia Street), published in 2002 was followed by Altın Aşk Vuruşu (The Thrust of Golden Love) in 2004.

=== Works ===
- Kalemimin Ucundaki Düşler. Toplumsal Dönüşüm Yayınları, 1998. (short story)
- Bulimia Sokağı. Remzi Kitabevi, 2002 (novel)
- Altın Aşk Vuruşu. Everest Yayınları, 2004 (novel)
- Aşk Notası. Artemis Yayınları, 2011 (novel)

== Musician ==
Aydilge's first album, entitled Küçük Şarkı Evreni (Small Song Universe), was released in April 2006 by EMI. The songs are a curious mixture of rock music and Eastern melodies. The lyrics were written and the music composed by Aydilge.

=== Albums ===
Küçük Şarkı Evreni (Small Song Universe), 2006, EMI

1. Bu Gece Ben Ay (Tonight I'm the Moon) 3:35
2. Tuğyan 3:51
3. Yalnız Değilsin (You Are Not Alone) 3:39
4. Yanıyor (Burning) 3:31
5. Postmodern Aşk (Postmodern Love) 2:41
6. Çal (Play) 4:16
7. Şiir (Poem) 3:58
8. Gece (Night) 3:16
9. Ninni (Lullaby) 3:37
10. Ay Aynamdır (The Moon Is My Mirror) 3:37

Sobe, 2009

1. Yollara Düşsem
2. Kalbim Hep Senle
3. Geri Dönmem
4. Yükseldin
5. Küçük Bir Renk
6. Canımla
7. Ah Bir Sevse
8. Güneş
9. Benim Aklım Sende

Kilit, 2011

1. Kilit
2. Takıntı
3. Kum
4. Aşk Lazım
5. Söyle
6. Yollara Düşsem
7. Kalbim Hep Senle
8. Küçük Bir Renk
9. Güneş
10. Geri Dönmem

Yalnızlıkla Yaptım, 2013

1. Intro – Yükseliş
2. Aşk Paylaşılmaz
3. Yine Ben Aşık Oldum
4. Yalnızlıkla Yaptım
5. İstanbul
6. Aşk Acı Sever
7. Haberin Yok
8. Akıllı Bir Deli
9. Demode
10. Sorma

Kendi Yoluma Gidiyorum, 2018

1. Yeni Başlayanlar İçin Aşk
2. Sonsuz Sevgilim
3. Kendi Yoluma Gidiyorum
4. Yana Yana
5. Akşam Çöktü Kalbime
6. Oyunbozan
7. Hüzün Ülkesi
8. Kusura Bak, Bilerek Oldu
9. Gece Uyku Tutmazsa
10. Sade Şarkı
11. Gel Sarıl Bana

Evden Canlı Canlı, Vol. 2, 2020

1. Sen misin İlacım? (Acoustic)
2. Yalnız Değilsin (Acoustic)
3. Bahçalarda Mor Meni (Gaziantep Yolunda) [Acoustic]
4. Uzun İnce Bir Yoldayım (Acoustic)
5. Aşk Yüzünden (Acoustic)
6. Hayat Şaşırtır! (Acoustic)
7. Gülmek Mümkün mü? (Acoustic)
8. Sade Şarkı (Acoustic)
9. Akşam Çöktü Kalbime (Acoustic)

=== Singles ===
- 2010: Takıntı
- 2011: Akıllı Bir Deli
- 2011: Sorma
- 2012: Kaçsam Ege'ye
- 2014: Aşka Gel
- 2015: Yangın Var
- 2015: Gelevera Deresi
- 2015: Kiralık Aşk (Sen misin İlacım?)
- 2016: Gel Sarıl Bana
- 2016: Aşk Olmak
- 2017: Yo Yo Yo
- 2018: Gece Uyku Tutmazsa
- 2019: Aşk Yüzünden (feat. Halil Sezai)
- 2019: Hayat Şaşırtır!
- 2019: Bir Ayda Unutursun (with Sehabe)
- 2020: Yalnızlık Masalı
- 2020: Nasıl İnansam?
- 2020: Bir Kedim Var
- 2021: Parmak İzlerin (feat. Birol Namoğlu)
- 2021: Bal Gibi
- 2022: Gecenin Haberi Var (Tuna Kiremitçi ve Arkadaşları, Vol. 3)
- 2022: Kendimi Kırdım Ben
- 2022: İki Keklik
- 2022: Umudum Var
- 2022: Sözlerin Bittiği Yer
- 2023: Keskin Bıçak
- 2023: Yüreğinden Öpüyorum (İbrahim Erkal Hürmet)
- 2023: Sahte Öpüşler (feat. Evrencan Gündüz)
- 2024: Ben Geldim
- 2024: Yaren Leylek
- 2024: İçime Düştü Ateş (feat. Anıl Piyancı)
