= 2020 BSL All-Star Game =

White Team	Red Team
126	144
	1	2	3	4	Total
White Team	39	29	27	31	126
Red Team	29	47	29	39	144
- Date: January 19, 2020
- Venue: Sinan Erdem Dome, Istanbul
- MVP: Archie Goodwin (Red Team)
- Referees: Serkan Emlek, Semih Vural, Mehmet Karabilecen
- Attendance: 15,000
- Halftime show: Ben Fero
- Network: a Spor
- Announcers: Ender Bilgin, Ali Baransel

BSL All-Star Game

The 2020 BSL All-Star Game, officially called the 2020 ING All-Star Game for sponsorship reasons, was held on January 19, 2020, at the Sinan Erdem Dome, Istanbul. The attendance was reportedly 15,000 as the tickets were sold out.

Yalçın Granit, 87 year-old former basketball player, was given the "All-Time All-Star Award" in the event.

== All-Star Game ==
=== Coaches ===
Ergin Ataman of Anadolu Efes was named as the head coach for the Red Team and Ufuk Sarıca of Pınar Karşıyaka was named as the head coach for the White Team.

=== Rosters ===
The format was different from the previous contests. Two teams, Red Team and White Team, competed in the event. Shane Larkin of Anadolu Efes and Nando de Colo of Fenerbahçe were named as the team captains for the Red Team and White Team, respectively. On January 12, the captains took turns drafting from the pool of 22 players.

Red Team
Pos.	Player	Team
Starters
PG	(Turkey) Shane Larkin	Anadolu Efes
SG	(United States) Aaron Harrison^{REP2}	Galatasaray
SF	(United States) Shaquielle McKissic	Beşiktaş
PF	(Turkey) Sertaç Şanlı	Anadolu Efes
C	(Greece) Zach Auguste	Galatasaray
Reserves
SG	(United States) Archie Goodwin	İTÜ
F/C	(United States) Emanuel Terry	Bandırma
G	(United States) Andrew Andrews	Büyükçekmece
F	(Turkey) Metecan Birsen	Pınar Karşıyaka
PG	(United States) Berk Uğurlu	Tofaş
PG	(Armenia) Chris Jones	Bursaspor
G	(France) Rodrigue Beaubois^{REP1}	Anadolu Efes
PG	(Serbia) Vasilije Micić^{INJ1}	Anadolu Efes
SG	(Turkey) Yiğit Arslan^{INJ2}	Galatasaray
Head coach: Ergin Ataman (Anadolu Efes)

White Team
Pos.	Player	Team
Starters
PG	(United States) Jordon Crawford	Afyon Belediye
SG	(Turkey) Melih Mahmutoğlu	Fenerbahçe
SF	(France) Nando de Colo	Fenerbahçe
PF	(France) Amath M'Baye	Pınar Karşıyaka
C	(United States) Moustapha Fall	Türk Telekom
Reserves
G/F	(United States) Drew Crawford	Gaziantep
G	(Turkey) Şehmus Hazer	Bandırma
PG	(United States) Robert Golden	Bahçeşehir Koleji
PG	(Turkey) Doğuş Özdemiroğlu	Darüşşafaka
PF	(United States) Devin Williams	Tofaş
C	(Bosnia and Herzegovina) Elmedin Kikanović	OGM Ormanspor
PF	(United States) Derrick Williams^{INJ3}	Fenerbahçe
Head coach: Ufuk Sarıca (Pınar Karşıyaka)

Notes

- Italics indicates the team captains.

^INJ1 Vasilije Micić was unable to play due to injury.
^INJ2 Yiğit Arslan was unable to play due to injury.
^INJ3 Derrick Williams was unable to play due to injury.
^REP1 Rodrigue Beaubois was selected as Vasilije Micić's replacement.
^REP2 Aaron Harrison was selected as Yiğit Arslan's replacement.

=== Game ===
January 19
16:30 TRT

Report

Red Team 144, White Team 123
Scoring by quarter: 29–39, 47–29, 29–27, 39–31
Pts: Goodwin 33; Rebs: Şanlı 8 Asts: Andrews 10	Pts: Crawford 23; Rebs: Williams 6 Asts: Crawford 9

Sinan Erdem Dome, Istanbul
Attendance: 15,000
Referees: Serkan Emlek, Semih Vural, Mehmet Karabilecen

== All-Star Organizations ==
=== Shooting Contest ===
The Shooting Contest, presented by Lenovo, involved a current BSL player, a retired male player, and a retired female player competing together in a shooting competition.

The competition was time based, involving shooting from four locations of increasing difficulty and making all four shots in sequential order. The first shot was a 3-meter shot from the right angle, the second was straight-on jump shot from the free throw line, the third was a three-point shot from the left angle and the fourth is a half-court shot. There was a two-minute time limit for each attempt and the top time won the competition.

Contestants
Team name	Members	Status	Time
Green Team
Green Team	Cevher Özer	OGM Ormanspor player	0:27
Green Team	Tutku Açık	Retired male	0:27
Green Team	Şaziye İvegin Üner	Retired female	0:27
Red Team
Red Team	Ender Arslan	Bursaspor player	0:28
Red Team	Tufan Ersöz	Retired male	0:28
Red Team	Esra Şencebe	Retired female	0:28
Blue Team
Blue Team	Sinan Güler	Darüşşafaka player	1:49
Blue Team	Muratcan Güler	Retired male	1:49
Blue Team	Nevriye Yılmaz	Retired female	1:49

=== Three-Point Contest ===
The Three-Point Contest was presented by Nesine.com.

Contestants
Pos.	Player	Team	Height	Weight	First round	Final round
G	Melih Mahmutoğlu	Fenerbahçe	1.91 m (6 ft 3 in)	85 kg (187 lb)	23	22
F	Kyle Wiltjer	Türk Telekom	2.08 m (6 ft 10 in)	109 kg (240 lb)	20	17
G	Tyler Kalinoski	Bandırma	1.93 m (6 ft 4 in)	82 kg (181 lb)	20	DNQ
G	Aaron Harrison	Galatasaray	1.98 m (6 ft 6 in)	90 kg (200 lb)	13	DNQ
F	Perry Jones	Bursaspor	2.11 m (6 ft 11 in)	107 kg (236 lb)	9	DNQ
G	Buğrahan Tuncer	Anadolu Efes	1.93 m (6 ft 4 in)	90 kg (200 lb)	8	DNQ

=== Slam Dunk Contest ===
The Slam Dunk Contest was presented by ING. Contestants made 4 dunks in a single round. The judges were Ömer Saybir, Muratcan Güler, Nevriye Yılmaz, Ben Fero and Ozan Güven.

Contestants
Pos.	Player	Team	Height	Weight	1st	2nd	3rd	4th	TOT	TB
F	Onuralp Bitim	Pınar Karşıyaka	1.98 m (6 ft 6 in)	93 kg (205 lb)	43	50	46	50	189	50
G	Nick Johnson	Türk Telekom	1.91 m (6 ft 3 in)	91 kg (201 lb)	44	46	50	49	189	49
F	Emanuel Terry	Bandırma	2.06 m (6 ft 9 in)	100 kg (220 lb)	42	40	46	50	178	
F	Derrick Williams^{INJ1}	Fenerbahçe	2.03 m (6 ft 8 in)	109 kg (240 lb)	DNP					

^INJ1 Derrick Williams was unable to play due to injury.
