= Pasaj Müzik =

Turkish record label

- Industry: Music & entertainment
- Founded: 2004
- Founder: Murat Doğan
- Headquarters: Beyoğlu, Istanbul, Turkey
- Website: https://pasajmuzik.com/

Pasaj Müzik is a Turkish record label founded in 2004. Based in Istanbul, the company operates in music production, digital distribution, catalogue management, copyright administration, content production, digital marketing, public relations, event management and artist management.

== History ==
In its early years, Pasaj released albums by artists working in various genres, including pop, rock and alternative music. Its releases in 2004 included Melek by Candan Erçetin, Dünya Yalan Söylüyor by Mor ve Ötesi and Uzun Uzun by Feridun Düzağaç. In 2005, its releases included Şebnem Ferah's Can Kırıkları, Athena's self-titled album, Yalın's Bir Bakmışsın and Kurban's İnsanlar.

In October 2007, Pasaj launched pafil.com, an online music platform for amateur and professional musicians. The website allowed musicians to create profiles, upload their music and sell their songs digitally without releasing an album.

The label continued releasing albums by Turkish artists in subsequent years, such as Redd's Kirli Suyunda Parıltılar (2006), Mirkelam's Mutlu Olmak İstiyorum (2006), Müslüm Gürses's Aşk Tesadüfleri Sever (2006) and Hadise's self-titled album (2008). Other releases associated with the label include works by Teoman, Seksendört, Gökçe and Haluk Levent.

== Artists ==
=== Current ===
- Athena
- Candan Erçetin
- Duman
- Güliz Ayla
- Hadise
- Redd
- Şebnem Ferah
- TNK

=== Former ===
- Atiye
- Burak Kut
- Kamufle
- Kolpa
- Kurban
- maNga
- Mor ve ötesi
- Müslüm Gürses
- Ogün Sanlısoy
- Patron
- Seksendört
- Yalın
- Kayra
