= Joker (rapper) =

Turkish rapper

- Born: Mete Erpek; 6 September 1987 (age 39); Eskişehir, Turkey
- Genre: Hip hop
- Occupations: Rapper; singer; songwriter
- Label: Hiphopjobz

Mete Erpek (born 6 September 1987), better known by his stage name Joker, is a Turkish rapper, singer and songwriter.

== Life and career ==
Born in Eskişehir on September 6, 1987, Mete Erpek became acquainted with hip hop culture thanks to the breakdancing videos and tapes he acquired from Bulgaria in 2002. He dealt with graffiti for 2 years, established his own studio in 2004 and started making rap music as an amateur under the name "Narkoza a.k.a. Stanley". He released his first amateur album, Narkoz a.k.a. Stanley, in 2005. In addition, the song "Mutluluk Tohumları" entered the top 10 in a demo contest. This success led him to join a group called Darp in Istanbul. He worked here for a year and then left the band. After attending university in Burdur for a while, he returned to Eskişehir. He took part in the albums of Battery Records and Allâme. In particular, they attracted attention with the song "Dünya İnanmıyor", which they included in the compilation album called Organize Oluyoruz 2 with Allâme. Joker announced on 11 December 11 2012 on Facebook that he was leaving Battery Records. He worked with important names of Turkish rap music such as Ceza and Sansar Salvo in his album Rhymestein, which he released in 2013. He founded his own studio, Hiphopjobz, in 2014. Released on 20 November 2015 with the label Dokuz Sekiz Müzik, was the album Microphone Show. He participated as a contestant in O Ses Türkiye on 25 December 2016 and reached the quarter finals. On 10 August 2018, he released his second album, Element, by the Sony Music label. He thinks it is wrong to associate rap music with drugs.

Since 2018, Joker has released a number of EPs and singles. In 2024, he released the album Inflowencer.

== Discography ==
=== Under the name Narkoz a.k.a. Stanley ===
Year	Title	Label	Type
2005	Rap Cellat-ı Mafya	Stanley Rec Room	EP
2005	Darpranga		Split album (with Darp)
2006	toM e Narko SHOW (Realist Akım Piyadeleri)		Split album (with toMBull aka Bahtiyar)
2006	Çatışma	Barakabeat Records	Solo album

=== Under the name Joker ===
Year	Title	Label	Type
2008	İllüzyon	Barakabeat Records	Split album (with Terapi)
2009	J Vitamini	Batarya Records	Solo album
2010	Sevdiğim Zamanlar	Batarya Records	Solo album
2010	Ghettoblaster	Batarya Records	Split album (with Allâme)
2011	Rhymeageddon	Batarya Records	Solo album
2011	Yaşamak Öldürür	Batarya Records	Solo album
2012	Darbe	Batarya Records	Single
2013	Rhymestein	Hiphopjobz	Solo album
2014	Fay Hattı	Hiphopjobz	Single
2015	Microphone Show	Dokuz Sekiz Müzik	Solo album
2016	Kirli Beyaz	Hiphopjobz	Single
2018	Element	Sony Music Entertainment	Solo album
2018	Parola	Hiphopjobz	Single
2018	Yarasa Koleksiyonu	Hiphopjobz	Single
2019	Black Jack	Hiphopjobz	Single
2019	Farketmez	Hiphopjobz	Single
2019	Günah Keçisi	Hiphopjobz	Single
2019	Son Kale	Hiphopjobz	Single (with Defkhan and Kurşun)
2019	Sürgün	Hiphopjobz	Single
2020	Gerek Yok	Hiphopjobz	Single
2020	Kural	Hiphopjobz	Single (with Mirac)
2020	Başarcam Ulan	Hiphopjobz	Single
2020	Game Over	Hiphopjobz	EP
2020	Zehirli Kan	Hiphopjobz	Single
2020	BayBay	Hiphopjobz	Single
2021	Kirli Beyaz (Bozuk Kaset)	47 Dakika	Bootleg
2021	Johntr4volt4	DMC	Single
2021	Paranoya	DMC	Single
2021	Kartanem	DMC	Single
2021	Anahtar	DMC	Single
2022	Kayboldum	DMC	Single
2022	Rockstar	DMC	Single
2022	Palavra	DMC	Single
2022	Asla	DMC	Single (with Gizem Aslı)
2022	Visin	Ultrasonic	Single (with Rapozof)
2023	Şerefe	DMC	Single
2023	Eriyorum Hala	DMC	Single
2023	Thanks for Advice	Muzik Bankasi	Single
2023	Cadillac	ONELAB	Single (with Todd)
2024	Inflowencer	Muzik Bankasi x HipHopJobz	Solo Album
2024	DPRM	HipHopJobz	Single
2024	Galaktik	ONELAB	(with Allame)
