= Kolpa (band) =

Turkish rock band

- Origin: Adana, Turkey
- Genre: Rock
- Years active: 2005–present
- Labels: Pasaj; DMC
- Members: Bora Yeter; Barış Yurtcu
- Past members: Dinçer Çetin; Samuray Gökçe; Cenk Taner Dönmez
- Website: Official website

Kolpa are a Turkish rock band originating from Adana.

== History ==
Kolpa was founded in Istanbul in 2005 by Bora Yeter (bass) and Barış Yurtcu (vocals), who had spent their high school years in Adana.

After Dinçer Çetin's departure from the band in 2007, he was replaced by Cenk Taner Dönmez. The band's debut album was prepared by the 3 members. In April 2009, their first album Hayat Senin was released. It was produced by Matthew Erdem and published by Mucize İşler, a branch of the Pasaj Müzik label. After releasing music videos for the songs "Sayende" and "Koşa Koşa", Samuray Gökçe joined the band on percussion.

In February 2010, the preparation for their first extended play (EP) began. The EP, which consists of 5 cover songs, was released under the title Maximum on 23 March 2010 by Pasaj Müzik. The first music video from this EP, "Böyle Ayrılık Olmaz", managed to rank 1st on a number of national charts. Actors Merve Boluğur and Çağkan Çulha played in the album's second music video "Kadınım".

In March 2011, the band released the first single, titled "Son Nefesim". According to data provided by Nielsen, the song ranked first on the main national rock chart for five weeks 5. Serbian model Sara Vulovic and Turkish actor Murat Prosçiler played in the song's music video.

With Haluk Kurosman serving as record producer, the band released their second studio album Yatağın Soğuk Tarafı in 2011, which consists of 10 songs. With the songs "Yatağın Soğuk Tarafı" and "Beni Aşka İnandır", the band was awarded the Best Band award at the 2012 Golden Butterfly Awards. Another song from Yatağın Soğuk Tarafı, titled "Hiç Bitmez Bu Masal", was used as the main theme song for Show TV's series Pis Yedili. The band made guest appearances in two episodes of the series.

The band's third studio album Aşk ve Hayat Hakkında was released by Pasaj Müzik in January 2014. The song "Gurur Benim Neyime?" from this album was a major hit in Turkey, with its music video being viewed more than 110 million times on YouTube.

On July 21st, 2021, the band declared through an Instagram post on their official account that their drummer, Samuray Gökçe, had decided to leave Kolpa in order to focus on his personal music. Once again trough their Instagram, this time on May 2023, the band announced that their guitar player, Cenk Taner Dönmez, would "step aside for a while".

== Discography ==
=== Albums ===
Year	Title	Label
2009	Hayat Senin	Mucize İşler / Pasaj Müzik
2011	Yatağın Soğuk Tarafı	Pasaj Müzik
2014	Aşk ve Hayat Hakkında	Pasaj Müzik

=== Singles ===
Year	Title	Label
2011	Son Nefesim	Pasaj Müzik
2012	Beni Aşka İnandır	Pasaj Müzik
2016	Hoş Geldin Ayrılığa (feat. Ece Seçkin)	DMC
2017	Tasma (feat. İskender Paydaş)	DMC
2018	Evet Aynen	DMC
2019	Unutmadım (feat. Yaprak Çamlıca)	Wovie
2019	Rüyalarda Buluşuruz	DMC

=== EPs ===
Year	Title	Label
2010	Maximum	Pasaj Müzik

== Filmography ==
Television

- Pis Yedili (2012)
- İnadına Aşk (2015)
- Leke (2019)
