= Haluk Levent =

Turkish rock musician

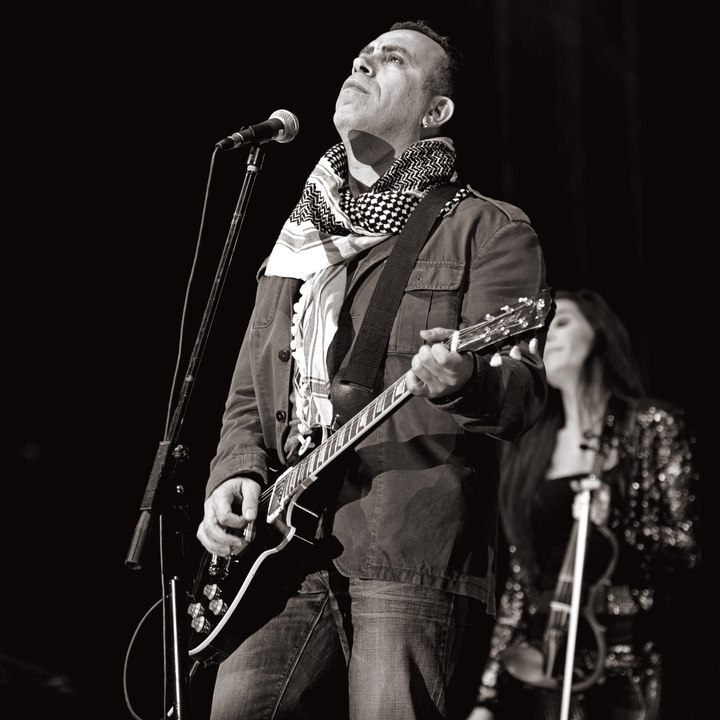
- Levent performing in Van

Background information
- Born: Haluk Acil; 26 November 1968 (age 57); Adana, Turkey
- Genres: Anatolian rock; Turkish folk; hard rock
- Occupations: Singer; musician; songwriter
- Instruments: Vocals; guitar
- Years active: 1992–present
- Labels: Prestij (1993–2003); U&P (2001–2002); Popüler (2002–2004); E&P (2002–2004); Belis (2004–2005); DMC (2005–2006); Mod (2006–2014); DNK (2014); Karameşe (2016); Pasaj & Garaj (2019–present)
- Website: haluklevent.com.tr

Haluk Levent (born Haluk Acil; 26 November 1968) is a Turkish rock singer who helped revive the long forgotten Anatolian rock genre in the 1990s.

In 2023, Levent was listed as one of Time magazine's 100 Most Influential People in the World. He later said he would not attend the gala due to the criticism aimed at the Turkish government in the entry penned by Elif Shafak.

Levent was voted Türkiye's most trusted celebrity for 7 consecutive years from 2019 to 2025, breaking records for the index.

In July 2026, he was jailed on charges of alleged money laundering and multi-million-dollar fraud.

== Early life ==
He was born on 26 November 1968, in the Yamaçlı neighborhood of Yüreğir, Adana.

He attended Sabancı Primary School for his primary education. After graduating from Adana Atatürk High School, he briefly studied Forestry Engineering at the Faculty of Forestry, Karadeniz Technical University; Computer Programming at Ankara University and Kastamonu Vocational School; Physics at the Faculty of Science and Letters, Middle East Technical University; and Accounting at Ankara University Vocational College. His family's financial difficulties played a significant role in his lack of a consistent university education. During this period, he also tried his hand at business, but having failed to succeed in the commercial world, he left Adana. He subsequently earned a living by singing in various cities.

== Music career ==
In 1992, Levent moved to Istanbul, where he performed in various bars in Ortaköy. There, he met Yıldıray Gürgen. After three years of work that began in 1990, he released his debut album, Yollarda, in July 1993. The album is regarded as one of the early releases of the 1990s revival of Anatolian rock music. That same year, Moğollar released its first album in 20 years. Yollarda sold approximately 200,000 copies.

Following the success of his debut album, Levent released Bir Gece Vakti in October 1995, which sold nearly one million copies. He released Arkadaş at the end of 1996. The album was regarded as one of the notable works of Anatolian rock music. Levent later said of Arkadaş, "I reached world standards with this album".

In August 1997, Levent was imprisoned over a bounced check dating back ten years and remained in prison for nine months and 15 days. Before his imprisonment, he completed the recordings for the album Mektup, which was released while he was in prison. During his imprisonment, he wrote his first book, Kedi Köprüsü, and cut his long hair, sending it to Gülnar in protest of the Akkuyu Nuclear Power Plant project.

After his release from prison, Levent had limited time to prepare his next album due to his upcoming 18-month military service. He released Yine Ayrılık in September 1998 before beginning his service. During his military service, he performed concerts in Eastern and Southeastern Anatolia, including regions he had not previously visited. Following the 1999 İzmit earthquake, he worked in the tent cities established in Izmit, helped set up tents, and performed benefit concerts for earthquake victims. He also spent his days off recording in the studio. At the beginning of 2000, he released www.leyla.com. The album addressed themes related to digitalization, including the digitalization of emotions, and featured the song "Kamyoncu Türküsü", which referenced the Susurluk scandal.

Levent worked with musicians such as Serdar Öztop and Akın Eldes. After completing his military service, he released the albums Kral Çıplak in February 2001, Bir Erkekeğin Günlüğü in October 2002, Aç Pencereni in September 2004, and Annemin Türküleri in April 2005. He also published his second book of essays, Moritos'un Düşleri. By 2005, the fifteenth year of his career, Levent had performed approximately 10,000 concerts in Turkey and abroad. He donated the proceeds from many of these concerts to patients in need, which contributed to his reputation as the "Benevolent Rocker".

In the late 2000s and 2010s, Levent continued his studio and live releases through various record labels. He released Akşam Üstü via Mod Müzik and Ozan Video in 2006, followed by Karagöz ve Hacivat under Mod Müzik in 2010. The same year, Süper Müzik Yapım issued a compilation album titled Trilogy. He subsequently released Dostane through DNK Müzik in 2014, and the live album Best of Konserler via Süper Müzik Yapım in 2015. He released Tam Bana Göre through Pasaj Müzik and Garaj Müzik in 2019. In 2021, he released the album Vasiyet under the Pasaj Müzik label.

One of Levent's best-known songs, "Elfida", was dedicated to Beyzanur, a nine-year-old girl who died of cancer. She was one of 16 children with cancer whom Levent supported with healthcare assistance and died before he completed the song.

Alongside his music career, Levent has been known for his involvement in environmental issues. He included songs promoting environmental awareness on many of his albums and supported legal actions against projects that were alleged to harm the environment in different regions of Turkey. He also protested against threats to the survival of Caretta caretta turtles in Kazanlı, Mersin. Levent has a daughter named Ela.

In 2021, Levent became a brand ambassador for the cryptocurrency exchange Bitexen and appeared alongside footballer Mario Balotelli in the company's advertising campaigns. Following this collaboration, in November 2021, Levent organised a charity event together with Balotelli, providing assistance to six families in need, Levent announced this support on his social media account with a photograph of the two of them drinking şalgam together.

== Ahbap ==
In 2017, Levent founded the NGO Ahbap, which by 2023 was active in 68 cities across Turkey. Following the February 2023 earthquake, Ahbap provided assistance to affected communities, increasing Levent's public profile in Turkey. Campaigns encouraging donations to Ahbap instead of the Disaster and Emergency Management Presidency (AFAD) were organized by some members of the public, as parts of society expressed distrust in AFAD's ability to respond effectively. These campaigns led to criticism of Ahbap and Levent from pro-government outlets. Levent later called for support for both Ahbap and AFAD, and singer Tarkan expressed support for his position. The hashtag "AFAD is ours, as is Ahbap" subsequently became widely used in Turkey.

=== Money laundering ===
On 12 July 2026, Levent was taken into custody by the Istanbul Police Department's Financial Crimes Division while traveling through Bursa and was subsequently transferred to Istanbul for questioning. The Istanbul Chief Public Prosecutor's Office initiated an investigation covering charges such as violating the Law on Associations, money laundering, and membership in a criminal organization. Prosecutors claim that earthquake relief funds and public donations intended for Ahbap were funneled into private bank accounts instead of being used for their humanitarian purposes. According to the official statement, approximately 120 million TL was allegedly transferred from the charity's accounts to a personal account belonging to Levent's assistant, which Levent reportedly used to buy multiple real estate properties. The prosecutor's office also alleged that hundreds of millions of Liras, amounting to up to 990 million TL in volume and causing significant losses up to 390 million TL, were routed through associated accounts to betting platforms between 2020 and 2026. Law enforcement officials indicated that the immediate operation to take Levent into custody was triggered by allegations that he was actively preparing to leave the country while already subject to an active travel ban.

The scope of the crackdown extended beyond Levent himself, as police raided the offices of Ahbap and conducted searches at multiple addresses. 18 suspects, including Levent, were taken into custody as part of the operation. Searches carried out at the suspects' addresses led to the seizure of a large quantity of digital material, cash, gold, cheques, promissory notes and various documents.

== Other legal issues and cryptocurrency-related fraud ==
In 2024, his name appeared in social media promotions for a blockchain initiative called Nigella World, which allegedly saw its token price collapse soon after the online promotion camping, leaving investors with losses. Critics accused the project's founder of failing to address concerns and claimed Levent's public endorsement had encouraged participation. Levent later denied any intention to mislead investors, emphasizing he was not involved in managing Nigella World's day-to-day operations.

Levent has also been associated with Nigella Chain, a platform under the Nigella World umbrella offering blockchain-based solutions in areas such as food safety and agricultural technology. In a 2024 LinkedIn post, Nigella World announced the launch of the "Nigella Blockchain Academy", crediting Levent's contributions and outlining plans to expand blockchain applications to finance, healthcare, and supply chain management.

Additionally, Levent collaborated with a local crypto exchange on the "HALUK" token, which was promoted as a charitable endeavor. While these ventures initially attracted public interest, they also drew criticism regarding transparency and the volatility of new digital assets.

In June 2026, Istanbul Anadolu 24th Enforcement Criminal Court ruled in a case concerning two dishonoured cheques issued by Levent. The court imposed a judicial fine of approximately ₺70 million for two separate cheques and barred him from issuing cheques or opening new cheque accounts.

== Personal life ==
He is the eighth of nine siblings. He has stated that his family is Alawite but he does not consider himself to be an ethnic Arab. He supports Beşiktaş, as well as his hometown team, Adana Demirspor. He married Neslin Yonarlar in 2004, whom he later divorced in 2017. The couple had one child together.

=== Narcotics and prostitution investigation ===
In July 2026, Levent's name was linked to a prostitution and drug probe carried out by the Istanbul Chief Public Prosecutor's Office in July 2026. Portuguese model Tessy Ramos Correia was arrested as part of the investigation, and her leaked police evidence claimed that Levent was connected to the group and used drugs.

Levent denied all allegations via a public statement, clarifying that he had never used drugs or smoked cigarettes in his life, emphasizing his long-standing social awareness initiatives against drug addiction. Following the leak of the testimony, the investigation was expanded into the Ahbap, leading to police raids and the detention of several individuals, including Levent.

== Discography ==
Studio albums

- Yollarda / Bu Ateş Sönmez (Prestij Müzik) (1993)
- Bir Gece Vakti (Prestij Müzik) (1995)
- Arkadaş (Prestij Müzik) (1996)
- Mektup (Prestij Müzik) (1997)
- Yine Ayrılık' (Prestij Müzik) (1998)
- www.leyla.com (2000)
- Kral Çıplak (2001)
- Bir Erkeğin Günlüğü (Popüler Müzik) (2002)
- Özel Canlı İstanbul Konseri (Popüler Müzik) (2003)
- Türkiye Turnesi 2003 (Popüler Müzik) (2003)
- Aç Pencereni (Belis & Seyhan Müzik) (2004)
- Annemin Türküleri (DMC) (2005)
- Akşam Üstü (Mod Müzik & Ozan Video) (2006)
- Karagöz ve Hacivat (Mod Müzik) (2010)
- Trilogy (Süper Müzik Yapım) (2010)
- Dostane (DNK Müzik) (2014)
- Best of Konserler (Süper Müzik Yapım) (2015)
- Tam Bana Göre (Pasaj Müzik & Garaj Müzik) (2019)
- Vasiyet (Pasaj Müzik) (2021)

Compilation albums

- Yaz Şarkıları (2006)
- Pop 2006 (2006)
- Prestij Meselesi (Orijinal Film Müzikleri) (2023)
