= Lil Zey =

Turkish singer and rapper (born 1994)

- Born: Zeynep Tanyalçın; 28 July 1994 (age 32); İzmir, Turkey
- Origin: Turkey
- Genres: Hip hop; trap
- Occupations: Rapper; singer; songwriter
- Instrument: Vocals
- Years active: 2019–present
- Labels: RedKeys Music, Atlantic Records Germany
- Website: itslilzey.com

Zeynep Tanyalçın (born 28 June 1994), better known by her stage name Lil Zey, is a Turkish rapper, singer and songwriter.

== Biography ==
Tanyalçın studied music management and songwriting at Berklee College of Music. In 2019, she voiced two songs in the album METFLIX, released under the label RedKeys Music. In the same year, she attracted the attention of the music market and the press with the song "Ötede Dur", released as a duet with KÖK$VL. She continued her career with the song "Yolumuz Yol Değil", which is a duet song with Khontkar. Towards the last months of 2019, she made a duet with Metth in the song "Marina". She released her first solo single named "Heveslenmem" in 2020. Tanyalçın signed a contract with "Universal Music Production" in 2020. Lil Zey was a nominee in the "Best Debut" category at the "17th Radyo Boğaziçi Music Awards" and later won.

== Discography ==
=== Singles and featurings ===
- Turn me Cold (2019) (feat. Metth)
- Dont @ Me (2019) (feat. Metth)
- Ötede Dur (2019) (feat. KÖK$VL)
- Yolumuz Yol Değil (2019) (feat. Khontkar)
- Marina (2019) (feat. Metth)
- Heveslenmem (2020)
- Eskisi Gibi (2020) (feat. Kozmos)
- Zor & Zor II (2020)
- Meditasyon (2021) (feat. GRKM)
- 1 Gr Eksik (2021)
- ELMAS (2021) (feat. Luciano)
- Matrix (2021)
- 80 Kere (2021) (feat. Rosalie.)
- Geçmişi Sil (2021) (feat. Kozmos)
- Keşif (2022) (feat. BYTE & Chasnu
- OnlyFans (2022)
- Gözyaşı Rapsodi 3 (2022) (feat. Khontkar)
- ÇEK (2023) (feat. Strick)
- DEFOL (2023)
- NAYLON (2023) (feat. Muerte Beatz)
- Çevir Tavukları (2024) (feat. Ezhel)
- madem öyle...(rastlaşcaz!) (2024)
- Sahipsiz (2025) (feat. Hande Yener)
- Öteki (2025)
- "Hipnoz" (2025)
- "Delikansız" (2025)
- "Muamma" (2026)

=== Albums ===
- Kara Tiyatro (2021)

== Awards and nominations ==
Year	Award	Category	Result	Reference
2020	17th Radyo Boğaziçi Music Awards	Best Debut	Won	
