= Dünya Yalan Söylüyor =

Studio album by Mor ve Ötesi
- Released: April 16, 2004
- Genre: Alternative rock
- Length: 42:39
- Label: Pasaj
- Producer: Tarkan Gözübüyük

Mor ve Ötesi chronology
Yaz (2003)	Dünya Yalan Söylüyor (2004)	Büyük Düşler (2006)

Dünya Yalan Söylüyor (The World is Telling Lies) is the fourth studio album by Turkish alternative rock band Mor ve Ötesi. It was released in 2004, and it has sold over 500,000 copies in Turkey.

The album was produced by Tarkan Gözübüyük. The keyboard and cümbüş parts on the album were performed by Ozan Tügen.

== Track listing ==
1. "Yardım Et"– 5:35
2. "Cambaz"– 3:50
3. "Bir Derdim Var"– 3:34
4. "Re"– 3:39
5. "Sevda Çiçeği"– 4:00
6. "Serseri"– 3:34
7. "Aşk İçinde" – 4:01
8. "Az Çok"– 2:39
9. "Son Deneme"– 3:17
10. "Uyan"- 27:26

== Hidden track ==
The album contains a hidden song: After the last song, on the same track, there are several minutes of silence, and then an extended instrumental version of Bir Derdim Var. This technique is similar to what Alanis Morissette did on Jagged Little Pill.

== Personnel ==
- Harun Tekin – vocals and rhythm guitar
- Kerem Kabadayı – drums
- Burak Güven – bass
- Kerem Özyeğen – lead guitar
- Ozan Tügen – keyboard, cümbüş
- Şebnem Ferah – guest vocals on "Yardım Et"
