= Ben Fero =

Turkish rapper and songwriter

- Born: Ferhat Yılmaz; 25 February 1991 (age 35); Bonn, Germany
- Origin: Germany; Turkey; Azerbaijan; Netherlands; Austria; Sweden; Switzerland; Russia; United Kingdom; England; Scotland
- Genres: Hip hop; trap
- Occupations: Rapper; singer; songwriter
- Years active: 2018–present

Ferhat Yılmaz (born 25 February 1991), better known by his stage name Ben Fero, is a Turkish rapper and songwriter.

== Life and career ==
Fero was born on 25 February 1991 in Bonn, Germany. His father is from Trabzon, and his mother is from Sivas. In 1994, he returned to Turkey with his family and settled in İzmir. At the age of 8, he became familiar with rap by listening to Tupac Shakur. Ben Fero studied at Sabanci University between 2009 and 2015. In April 2018, his first song, "Mahallemiz Esmer" was released. After releasing another single, "Kimlerdensin", in August 2018, he decided to leave his job as a sales manager in a private company and focus on music. He is reportedly close to Ezhel and YouTuber Berkcan Güven, and this made it easier for him to make himself known in the music market. On 30 November 2018, he released his third single "3 2 1". On 2 December 2018, the song ranked first on Spotify's list of most listened songs in Turkey.

On the 20th of February 2019, his first studio album, Orman Kanunları, was released, which also included the singles that he had previously released on its track listing. On the day it was released, all of its songs ranked among the top 12 on Spotify Türkiye Top 50. He became the first artist in Turkey whose songs from one album entered the list all at the same time. Out of these songs, "Biladerim İçin" ranked first on music charts for weeks. He also changed the name of the song "Akalım" to "Demet Akalın", after Turkish pop singer Demet Akalın.

On 9 May 2019, at the 16th Radio Boğaziçi Music Awards he received the "Best Newcomer Artist" award. On January 19, 2020, he performed at the Sinan Erdem Dome following the 2020 Basketbol Süper Ligi All-Star Game.

On 25 September 2020, he released his first EP titled Yabani.

== Discography ==
Studio albums

- Orman Kanunları (2019)

EPs

- Yabani (2020)

Singles

- "Mahallemiz Esmer" (2018)
- "Kimlerdensin" (2018)
- "3 2 1" (2018)
- "JENGA" (ft. Khontkar) (2019)
- "Fight Kulüp" (ft. Killa Hakan, Ceza, Ezhel) (2019)
- "Arkadaş" (2019)
- "Kim O" (ft. Keişan) (2020)
- "Sıkı Dur" (ft. Anıl Piyancı) (2020)
- "İzmir'in Ateşi" (ft. Maho G) (2020)
- "Üçe Beşe Bakamam" (ft. Cash Flow) (2021)
- "50 Kilo" (ft. Gringo) (2021)
- "Bunlar Anlamaz" (2022)
- "Çok Kolay" (2022)
- "BİTMİYOR" (2023)
