= Ceg =

Turkish rapper

Ceg Jagged Cegıd
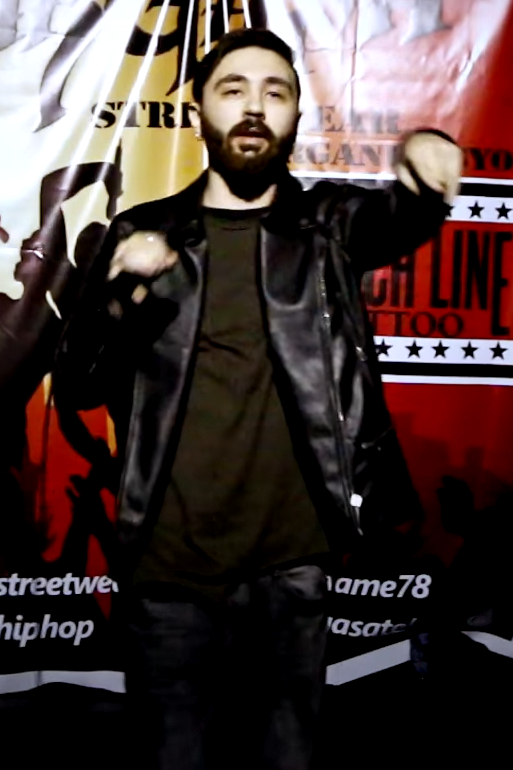
- Ceg in 2018

Background information
- Born: Volkan Ayvazoğlu; 28 June 1993 (age 33); Eskişehir, Turkey
- Genre: Hip hop
- Occupations: Rapper; singer; songwriter
- Years active: 2007 2026

Volkan Ayvazoğlu (born 28 June 1993), better known by his stage name Ceg, Cegıd, Jagged, Jaggedryhme ([dʒeɟ]), is a Turkish rapper, singer and songwriter.

== Discography ==
=== Studio albums ===
- TepeBaşı Cehennemi (2007)
- Disstributör EP (2007)
- Poligon Mixtape (of Sfenx MassaCrew) (2007)
- Optimus Prime (2008)
- Ağır Siklet Rap (2009)
- Mixtape Vol 1 (of BK26) (2010)
- Müzikte Devrim (2012)
- Alter Ego (2014)
- Delüzyon (2016)
- Trapanasyon (2018)
- DMT (2020)
- Bipolar (2025)

=== Singles and EPs ===
- Alles Gefickt (ft. AbdeZz)
- J&b (ft. Bambıl B)
- Doğduğumdan Beri
- Sahnelerde Büyüdüm
- Sevilmeyen Adam(2014)
- Son 2 Yıl(2015)
- Volkan Ayvazoğlu(2015)
- Dünya Kadar (2018)
- Bu Gece (2018)
- Bu Gece (Furkan Karakılıç Remix) (2020)
- Zorla (2019) (ft. Taki)
- Şampanya (2019)
- Sokaklar (2019)
- Son Gaz (ft. Ati242)
- Yeşillendir (ft. Anıl Piyancı)
- Bu Gece Bizim (ft. Tankurt Manas & Grogi)
- First Class (2020)
- Gerçekleşebilir (2021)
- Gökyüzü Limit (2022)
- Introvert (2025)
- Babam Kadar
- İntikam Vakti
- Biz Geri Döndük ft. BK26
- Düşmanın Degillim ft. Taki
- Bu Gece Şarhoşuz ft. BK26
- Et Yiyen Çiçek
- Kabus
- Kötü Örnek
- Ne Zaman
- Biz Geri Döndük ft. BK26
- Alter Ego
- Herşey Yolunda ft.BK26
- Tanrı Sesimi duymuyor ft. Bedmadi
- Avımı avlarım ft. Şathiyat
- Drinks up ft. BK26
- Kendinle Gurur Duy
- Lanet Rap
- Manyak Şey
- Şerefine Tayyip
- Kemalist Kal
- Cigarımı Söndürdüm ft. Bumblebee
- Merhaba
- Vaşak
- Hayalperest
- Hırsız Var
- Herşeyin Bir Bedeli Var
- Rock"n Roll
- Kötü Çoçuk
- Anormal
- Bunu Seyret
- Deli Miyim Neyim ft. Detstyle
- Dünya Umrumda Degil
- Farklı Kişilik
- Şaka
- Karındeşen Ceg
- Böyle Olmayı İstemedim
- Oktay "Skit"
- Yanlızca Benim
- Şş Allah Aşkına
- Kimse Duymasın
- Dibe Batım
- Sikeyim Eskişehiri
- Müzik Özgürlüktür
- Orta Parmak
- Tanrının Askeri
- Volkan Ayvazoglu 2012
- Türkiyede Rapçi Olmak
- Baba Fingo ft. BK26
- Asi Çoçuk
- Televizyon
- Fahişeler ft. Anafor Chucy
- Piliç
