= Archie Goodwin (basketball) =

American basketball player (born 1994)

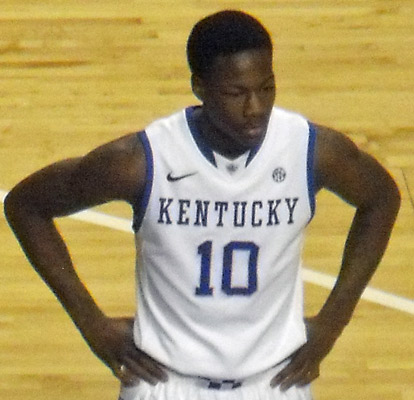
- Goodwin with the Kentucky Wildcats in 2012

No. 8 – Changwon LG Sakers
- Position: Shooting guard
- League: KBL

Personal information
- Born: August 17, 1994 (age 32) Little Rock, Arkansas, U.S.
- Listed height: 6 ft 5 in (1.96 m)
- Listed weight: 210 lb (95 kg)

Career information
- High school: Sylvan Hills (Sherwood, Arkansas)
- College: Kentucky (2012–2013)
- NBA draft: 2013: 1st round, 29th overall pick
- Drafted by: Oklahoma City Thunder
- Playing career: 2013–present

Career history
- 2013–2016: Phoenix Suns
- 2014–2015: →Bakersfield Jam
- 2016: New Orleans Pelicans
- 2016–2017: Greensboro Swarm
- 2017: Brooklyn Nets
- 2017–2018: Greensboro Swarm
- 2018: Northern Arizona Suns
- 2018: Zhejiang Golden Bulls
- 2019: Maine Red Claws
- 2019–2020: Sigortam.net İTÜ BB
- 2020: Ratiopharm Ulm
- 2020–2021: Metropolitans 92
- 2022: BC Budivelnyk
- 2022: Maccabi Rishon LeZion
- 2022: Cariduros de Fajardo
- 2022–2023: BC Budivelnyk
- 2023: Cariduros de Fajardo
- 2023–2024: Beirut Club
- 2024: Ningbo Rockets
- 2024: El Calor de Cancún
- 2024–2025: Jiangsu Dragons
- 2025–2026: Taipei Fubon Braves
- 2026–present: Changwon LG Sakers

Career highlights
- BSL All-Star Game MVP (2020); SEC All-Freshman team (2013); McDonald's All-American (2012); First-team Parade All-American (2012); 2× Arkansas Mr. Basketball (2011, 2012)
- Stats at NBA.com
- Stats at Basketball Reference

Archie Lee Goodwin III (born August 17, 1994) is an American professional basketball player for the Changwon LG Sakers of the Korean Basketball League (KBL). He played college basketball for Kentucky.

== High school career ==
Goodwin attended Sylvan Hills High School in Sherwood, Arkansas where he played for coach Kevin Davis and led his team to back-to-back state finals. As a junior in 2010–2011, his bid for a championship came up short when his team fell to Alma High School from Alma, Arkansas. As a senior in 2011–12, Goodwin led the Bears to the Arkansas Class 5A state championship, scoring 27 points and seven rebounds in the title game; winning championship and tournament MVP honors along the way. Goodwin was twice named the Gatorade Player of the Year for Arkansas and named to the McDonald's and Parade All-American teams.

Goodwin was rated as the number 15 player in the class of 2012 in the ESPNU 100, the number 9 player by Scout.com, and the number 12 player by Rivals.com.

Goodwin chose Kentucky over offers from Arkansas, Memphis, Connecticut, and Kansas, among many others.

College recruiting
Name	Hometown	School	Height	Weight	Commit date
Archie Goodwin; SG	Sherwood, Arkansas	Sylvan Hills HS	6 ft 5 in (1.96 m)	181 lb (82 kg)	Sep 20, 2011
Archie Goodwin; SG	Recruit ratings: Scout: Rivals: (97)				

=== Awards and honors ===
- 2011 Arkansas Class 5A State Finalist, and All-Tournament Team
- 2011 and 2012 Arkansas Class 5A All-State Team
- 2011 and 2012 Arkansas Gatorade Player of the Year
- 2011 and 2012 Arkansas McDonald's Full Court Awards Player of the Year
- 2011 and 2012 Mr. Basketball of Arkansas (Arkansas Democrat-Gazette)
- 2012 Arkansas Class 5A State Championship, Championship Game MVP, and All-Tournament Team and MVP
- 2012 Parade All-American
- 2012 McDonald's All-American
- 2012 Jordan Brand Classic / USA Basketball Junior Select Team
- 2012 ESPN HS Boys' Basketball All-American (Third Team)

== College career ==
Goodwin was the leading scorer for the 2012–13 Kentucky Wildcats men's basketball team. He was named Freshman All-SEC after leading Kentucky with 14.1 points per game in 33 appearances (33 starts). He also averaged 4.6 rebounds, 2.7 assists and 1.1 steals to help the Wildcats to a 21–12 record. He tallied a career-high 28 points on 8-of-13 shooting and 12-of-17 free throws against Morehead State on November 21. Two days later, he narrowly missed the second triple-double in UK history against LIU-Brooklyn with 22 points and career highs of nine rebounds and nine assists.

On April 1, 2013, Goodwin declared for the 2013 NBA draft. He was the second-youngest player to declare for the 2013 draft behind Greece's Giannis Antetokounmpo and the youngest-overall American college player.

=== College statistics ===
Year	Team	GP	GS	MPG	FG%	3P%	FT%	RPG	APG	SPG	BPG	PPG
2012–13	Kentucky	33	33	31.8	.440	.266	.637	4.6	2.7	1.1	.5	14.1

== Professional career ==
=== Phoenix Suns (2013–2016) ===
==== 2013–14 season ====
On June 27, 2013, Goodwin was chosen by the Oklahoma City Thunder with the 29th overall pick in the 2013 NBA draft. His rights were then traded to the Golden State Warriors, before finally to the Phoenix Suns, all on draft night. On July 12, 2013, he signed his rookie scale contract with the Suns and joined them for the 2013 NBA Summer League. In his first Summer League game, Goodwin recorded 13 points and 3 rebounds against the Portland Trail Blazers.

On October 30, 2013, Goodwin made his NBA debut against the Portland Trail Blazers. In 8 minutes of action, Goodwin attempted three shots and grabbed one offensive rebound. Goodwin, known as an aggressive scorer in college, went scoreless in his NBA debut. However, in Goodwin's second game against the Utah Jazz on November 1, he scored his first NBA field goal. In 11 minutes of action, Goodwin shot 2-of-5 from the field and ended with 4 points; he also recorded 2 blocks. On November 19, 2013, he recorded his first double-digit-scoring game with 16 points in a loss to the Sacramento Kings.

On January 23, 2014, Goodwin was assigned to the Bakersfield Jam of the NBA Development League. He was recalled on January 26, reassigned on February 5, and recalled again on February 10. In the Suns' final game of the season, Goodwin scored a career-high 29 points in a 104–99 win over the Sacramento Kings.

==== 2014–15 season ====
After managing just 10 games for the Suns to start the season, Goodwin was reassigned to the Bakersfield Jam on December 25, 2014. He was recalled six days later. He was later reassigned to the Jam several more times during the season, as he helped the Jam win the inaugural D-League Showcase championship and won the Showcase Tournament's MVP award on January 19. He once again had an impressive regular season finale for the Suns, scoring a season-high 18 points in a loss to the Los Angeles Clippers.

==== 2015–16 season ====
To begin the 2015–16 season, Goodwin saw limited court time aside from a 12-point, 17-minute outing in the team's season opener, which saw the Suns routed by the Dallas Mavericks at home. Over the next seven games, Goodwin averaged 6.9 minutes per game, competing for court time with new additions to the team in Devin Booker and Sonny Weems. He later had two 12-point games in mid-November, both of which he played over 24 minutes in. He did not see regular court time for the Suns until early January following the injury to Eric Bledsoe. On January 21, 2016, he scored a season-high 20 points as a starter in a loss to the San Antonio Spurs. Two days later, he topped that mark with 24 points against the Atlanta Hawks. In that game, Goodwin hit a three-pointer from atop the arc with 0.1 seconds left to lift the Suns over the Hawks with a 98–95 win, ending a six-game losing streak. He topped his season-high mark for a third game in a row on January 26, scoring 26 points in a loss to the Philadelphia 76ers. On February 2, he recorded 18 points and had a career-high 12 assists in a 104–97 loss to the Toronto Raptors. On February 10, in a game against the Golden State Warriors, Goodwin and teammate Markieff Morris got into a physical altercation on the bench and were seen arguing during a timeout. The argument escalated into a shoving match between the pair, as teammates quickly stepped in and separated the two.

Goodwin was released by the Suns on October 24, 2016, prior to the start of the 2016–17 regular season, in a move that was considered unexpected by many in the NBA. It was suggested that the Suns already had plenty of guards that needed some playing time as it was, and that there wasn't enough time for Goodwin to be fully satisfied in the process. However, it was later confirmed by general manager Ryan McDonough that Goodwin had originally asked the team to try to trade him if it were possible, but the Suns couldn't find a team to help him out before the start of the regular season.

=== New Orleans Pelicans (2016) ===
On November 7, 2016, Goodwin signed with the New Orleans Pelicans. He made his debut for the Pelicans five days later, scoring seven points off the bench in a 126–99 loss to the Los Angeles Lakers. On November 20, he was waived by the Pelicans after appearing in three games.

=== Greensboro Swarm (2016–2017) ===
On November 30, 2016, Goodwin was acquired by the Greensboro Swarm of the NBA Development League. The next day, he made his debut for the Swarm in a 121–106 loss to the Texas Legends, recording 18 points, six rebounds and one assist in 29 minutes.

=== Brooklyn Nets (2017) ===
On March 15, 2017, Goodwin signed a 10-day contract with the Brooklyn Nets. He went on to sign a second 10-day contract on March 25, and a multi-year contract on April 4. In the Nets' season finale on April 12, 2017, Goodwin scored a season-high 20 points in a 112–73 loss to the Chicago Bulls. On July 28, 2017, he was waived by the Nets.

=== Greensboro Swarm and Northern Arizona Suns (2017–2018) ===
On September 11, 2017, Goodwin signed a training camp contract with the Portland Trail Blazers. He was waived by the Trail Blazers on October 13, 2017, after appearing in five preseason games.

In the 2017–18 season, Goodwin split time between the Greensboro Swarm and the Northern Arizona Suns.

=== Maine Red Claws (2019) ===
On October 19, 2018, he was traded to the Maine Red Claws in exchange for the rights to Daniel Dixon, but did not make the team's final roster. On January 3, 2019, Goodwin re-signed with the Red Claws.

=== Sigortam.net İTÜ BB (2019–2020) ===
On September 30, 2019, Goodwin signed with Sigortam.net İTÜ BB of the Turkish Basketball Super League.

=== Ratiopharm Ulm (2020) ===
On February 6, 2020, Goodwin signed with Ratiopharm Ulm of the German Basketball Bundesliga. He averaged 7.0 points and 5.0 rebounds per game before the season was suspended.

=== Metropolitans 92 (2020–2021) ===
On November 25, 2020, Goodwin signed with Metropolitans 92 of the LNB Pro A. He averaged 8.7 points and 2.0 rebounds per game.

=== Budivelnyk (2022) ===
On January 8, 2022, Goodwin signed with Budivelnyk of the Ukrainian Basketball Super League. He left the team in February 2022 in the prelude to the Russian invasion of Ukraine.

=== Maccabi Rishon LeZion (2022) ===
On February 23, 2022, Goodwin signed with Maccabi Rishon LeZion of the Israeli Premier League.

=== Return to Budivelnyk (2022–2023) ===
On July 31, 2022, he has signed with BC Budivelnyk of the European North Basketball League.

=== El Calor de Cancún (2024) ===
On August 13, 2024, he joined El Calor de Cancún of the Liga Nacional de Baloncesto Profesional.

=== Jiangsu Dragons (2024-2025) ===
On October 20, 2024, Goodwin signed with Jiangsu Dragons of the Chinese Basketball Association.

=== Taipei Fubon Braves (2025–2026) ===
On August 22, 2025, Goodwin signed with the Taipei Fubon Braves of the P. League+.

=== Changwon LG Sakers (2026–present) ===
On July 3, 2026, Goodwin signed with the Changwon LG Sakers of the Korean Basketball League.

== Career statistics ==
Legend
GP	Games played	GS	Games started	MPG	Minutes per game
FG%	Field goal percentage	3P%	3-point field goal percentage	FT%	Free throw percentage
RPG	Rebounds per game	APG	Assists per game	SPG	Steals per game
BPG	Blocks per game	PPG	Points per game	**Bold**	Career high

=== NBA ===
==== Regular season ====
Year	Team	GP	GS	MPG	FG%	3P%	FT%	RPG	APG	SPG	BPG	PPG
2013–14	Phoenix	52	0	10.3	.455	.139	.673	1.7	.4	.4	.2	3.7
2014–15	Phoenix	41	2	13.0	.393	.293	.735	1.8	1.1	.4	.2	5.6
2015–16	Phoenix	**57**	**13**	**19.5**	.417	.232	.674	**2.5**	**2.1**	**.5**	.2	**8.9**
2016–17	New Orleans	3	0	10.0	.400	**.500**	**1.000**	.0	.3	.0	**.3**	5.0
2016–17	Brooklyn	12	0	15.3	.**557**	.308	.719	2.3	1.9	.3	**.3**	7.9
Career		165	15	14.5	.429	.236	.700	2.0	1.2	.4	.2	6.3

=== NBA G League ===
Year	Team	GP	GS	MPG	FG%	3P%	FT%	RPG	APG	SPG	BPG	PPG
2013–14	Bakersfield	5	2	**35.4**	.494	**.385**	**.810**	5.2	1.2	1.4	.0	**26.4**
2014–15	Bakersfield	9	9	33.1	.441	.289	.653	6.2	2.1	**1.7**	.2	22.7
2016–17	Greensboro	**34**	**33**	32.7	.438	.235	.724	5.2	2.3	1.2	.3	17.0
2017–18	Northern Arizona	27	21	33.4	**.554**	.311	.687	**6.3**	3.2	1.6	.3	19.4
2017–18	Greensboro	7	7	27.1	.413	.333	.768	4.3	2.3	1.4	.1	17.6
2018–19	Maine	29	5	29.6	.461	.242	.636	5.3	**3.9**	1.2	**.7**	17.0
Career		111	77	31.9	.472	.273	.697	5.5	2.9	1.4	.4	18.5

== Personal life ==
Goodwin's stepfather, Datron Humphrey, introduced him to basketball as a youth. In addition, his father, Archie Goodwin II, played college basketball for Arkansas State University.
