= Saian (rapper) =

- Born: Necati Güney Erkurt; 1 December 1983 (age 42); Mersin, Turkey
- Genre: Hip hop
- Occupations: Rapper; singer; songwriter
- Years active: 2003–present

Necati Güney Erkurt (born 1 December 1983), better known by his stage name Saian, is a Turkish rapper and songwriter. He is also the older brother of Patron.

== Discography ==
=== Albums and EPs ===
- "Arabesque" 2003
- "Kült" 2005
- "Olma!" 2006
- "Opus Magnum Provaları" 2006
- "Bootleg Kofti Bootleg" 2006
- "Sıkı Dur Geliyorum" 2007
- "Battle Royal (ft. Karaçalı)" 2009
- "Dilimizi Biliyor" 2010
- "Başıbozuk" 2012
- "Başıbozuk 2" 2013
- "Hal ve Gidiş Sıfır (ft. Köst)" 2017
- "Malenkof! (ft. Köst)" 2017
- "Berhava" 2019
- "Deliler Bayramı (ft. Köst)" 2020

=== Singles ===
- Ay Şarkısı (2020)
- Birkaç Güzel Gün İçin (feat. Bedo) (2020)
- S.O.S (feat. Patron) (2020)
- Kırmızı Çiçeklinin Öyküsü (2018)
- Kalsedon (2018)
- Tüm Ölü Krallar (feat. Sinem Güngör) (2018)
- Küs (feat. Kayra) (2007)
