= Metin Boşnak =

Turkish academic (born 1965)

- Born: 1965 (age 60–61)
- Education: Ondokuz Mayıs University (B.A); Indiana University (M.A); Hacettepe University (PhD)
- Occupation: Academic

Metin Boşnak (born 1965) is a Turkish professor of Bosniak origin. His academic publications include contributions to the fields of American culture and literature and comparative literature and cinematography.

Metin Boşnak has a BA in TEFL from College of Education, Ondokuz Mayıs University, Samsun, Turkey. As a Fulbright scholar, he completed his M.A. in Comparative Literature at Indiana University, Bloomington, Indiana, in 1990. On return to Turkey, he pursued a PhD in American studies at Hacettepe University, Ankara, which was completed in 1996. Dr. Boşnak published a collection of poetry in English and Turkish in 1987, Behind My Shadow. Since then he has been publishing scholarly articles on various aspects of Comparative Literature and American Studies. He presented numerous papers at home and abroad, co-edited two academic periodicals: Kızılırmak (1992), and Academia (1995). Dr. Boşnak set up, and has chaired the Department of American Studies at Fatih University (September 2000 – August 2007). Earlier he set up and chaired the Department of English Language and Literature at Fatih University (September 1997 – January 2006). He also chaired the Department of Foreign Languages at Fatih University (February 1998 – July 1999). As a visiting professor, he taught in English Department, St. Louis Community College (STLCC-Meramec Campus), Missouri (Fall 2007 – Spring 2008). Upon returning home, he taught in the English Department, Girne American University (2008–2009). Boşnak taught at Saint Louis Community College in 2009–2010. He has professional affiliations with MLA, ACLA, ICLA, ASA and MCCA. Currently, he teaches in the English Department of Istanbul Sabahattin Zaim University after seven years of work at the International University of Sarajevo, Bosnia and Herzegovina. He is the author of a collection of poetry, Behind My Shadow (1987)(Gölgemin Arkasında), McDevlet, McDarbeler (2017), McStates, Democracy, McCoups (2021), Archetypal and Feminist Approaches to American Literature (2021), T.S. Eliot’s Poetics of Politics (2021) and Poetics of Love (Aşkın Poetikası) (2021).
