= Tankurt Manas =

Turkish rapper

- Born: Tankurt Tan; 27 November 1991 (age 34); Eminönü, Istanbul, Turkey
- Genres: Hip hop; trap
- Occupations: Rapper; singer; songwriter
- Website: tankurtmanas.net

Tankurt Tan (born 27 November 1991), better known by his stage name Tankurt Manas, is a Turkish rapper, singer and songwriter.

== Discography ==
=== Studio albums ===
- Koleksiyon Vol.1 (2016)
- Koleksiyon Vol.2 (2016)
- Bilinçaltı (2018)

=== Singles and EPs ===
- Çene Kemiklerimi Kırdım (2013)
- Çene Kemiklerimi Kırdım (Remake) (2013)
- Nostal-G (2013)
- Sıkıntı Yok (2017)
- Bu Böyle (2017)
- Bu Benim Olayım (Tanerman Remix) (2018)
- Art Arda (2019)
- Mola (2019)
- Say (2019)
- Çift Telefon (2019) (feat. Yung Ouzo)
- Akbabalar (2019)
- Art Arda (Kevs Remix) (2019) (with Kevs)
- Düşüyorum (2019)
- Paramparça (2019)
- GOP City (2019)
- Beni 1 Salın (2019)
- KGY (2019)
- Ben Şimdi EYM #2 (2019)
- Bu Gece Bizim (2020) (with Grogi & Ceg)
- Uçuyorum (2020)
- Yeşil (2020)
- Katliam 4 (2020) (with Massaka, Diablo63, Anıl Piyancı, Killa Hakan, Eypio, Hidra, Yener Çevik, Selo, Joe Young, CashFlow, Tepki, Tekmill, Canbay & Wolker)
- Hepsini Vur (2020)
- Bilmiyorlar EYM #3 (2021)
- BBBY (2021)
- Beni Sevmon Mu? (2021) (with Sefo & Furkan Karakılıç)
- Deli midir Nedir? (2021) (with Ekin Ekinci)
- Test (2021)
- İçimde Biri Var (2021)
- Çift Telefon (2021) (feat. Yung Ouzo)
- DUMANLARX2 (2021)
- Son Vites (2021)
- Zincirler (2022) (with Love Ghost)
- Eyvah (2022) (with Reder)
- Aynen (2022)
- Lodos (64Bars) (2022) (with Efe Can)
- Puff Daddy (2022) (with İdo Tatlıses)
