= Zen-G =

- Born: Burak Kaçar; November 18, 1994 (age 31); Istanbul, Turkey
- Genre: Hip hop
- Occupations: Rapper; singer; songwriter
- Years active: 2007–present

Burak Kaçar (born 18 November 1994), better known by his stage name Zen-G, is a Turkish rapper, singer and songwriter.

== Life and career ==
He was born in 1994, in Istanbul. He founded a band with his friend Tahribad-ı İsyan in 2008. He has made a song for a Toyota ad.

== Discography ==
=== Albums ===
- ZENGBEJ
1. MAMA'S PRELUDE
2. MAMA (INTRO)
3. İSTANBUL - (ft. Bayhan)
4. HÜKÜM - (ft. İsmail Tuncbilek)
5. İSKENDER
6. TATTO - (ft. Khontkar)
7. GİRME KANIMA - (ft. Asil)
8. ALEV ALEV - (ft. Ati242)
9. SUÇ İŞLERİ BAKANI - (ft. Asil)
10. DELALÊ
11. BABA (OUTRO)

=== Singles and EPs ===
- "ABİS"
- "Temizle" - Zen-G, Arda Gezer
- "Eyvallah" - Zen-G, Emcey, Burak Alkın
- "KIYAK" - Zen-G, Emza
- "2020" - Zen-G, Can VS
- "ALEV ALEV" - Zen-G, Ati242
- "GİRME KANIMA" - Zen-G, Asil
- "DELALÊ"
- "Tuzak" - Zen-G, Maho G
- "İmkansız Yok"
- "TATTO" - Zen-G, Khontkar
- "HARBİ FREESTYLE" - Zen-G, Burak Alkın
- "ELHAMDRİLLAH" - Zen-G

=== Duets ===
- "Temizle" - Zen-G, Arda Gezer
- "Eyvallah" - Zen-G, Emcey, Burak Alkın
- "KIYAK" - Zen-G, Emza
- "2020" - Zen-G, Can VS
- "ALEV ALEV" - Zen-G, Ati242
- "GİRME KANIMA" - Zen-G, Asil
- "Tuzak" - Zen-G, Maho G
- "TATTO" - Zen-G, Khontkar
- "HARBİ FREESTYLE" - Zen-G, Burak Alkın
- "Bi De Bana Sor" - Arda Gezer, Kaya Giray, Zen-G
- "Flowjob" - Ati242, Zen-G
- "Boulevard" - Berrin Keklikler, Zen-G
- "Favela" - Grogi, Asil, Zen-G
