= Keişan =

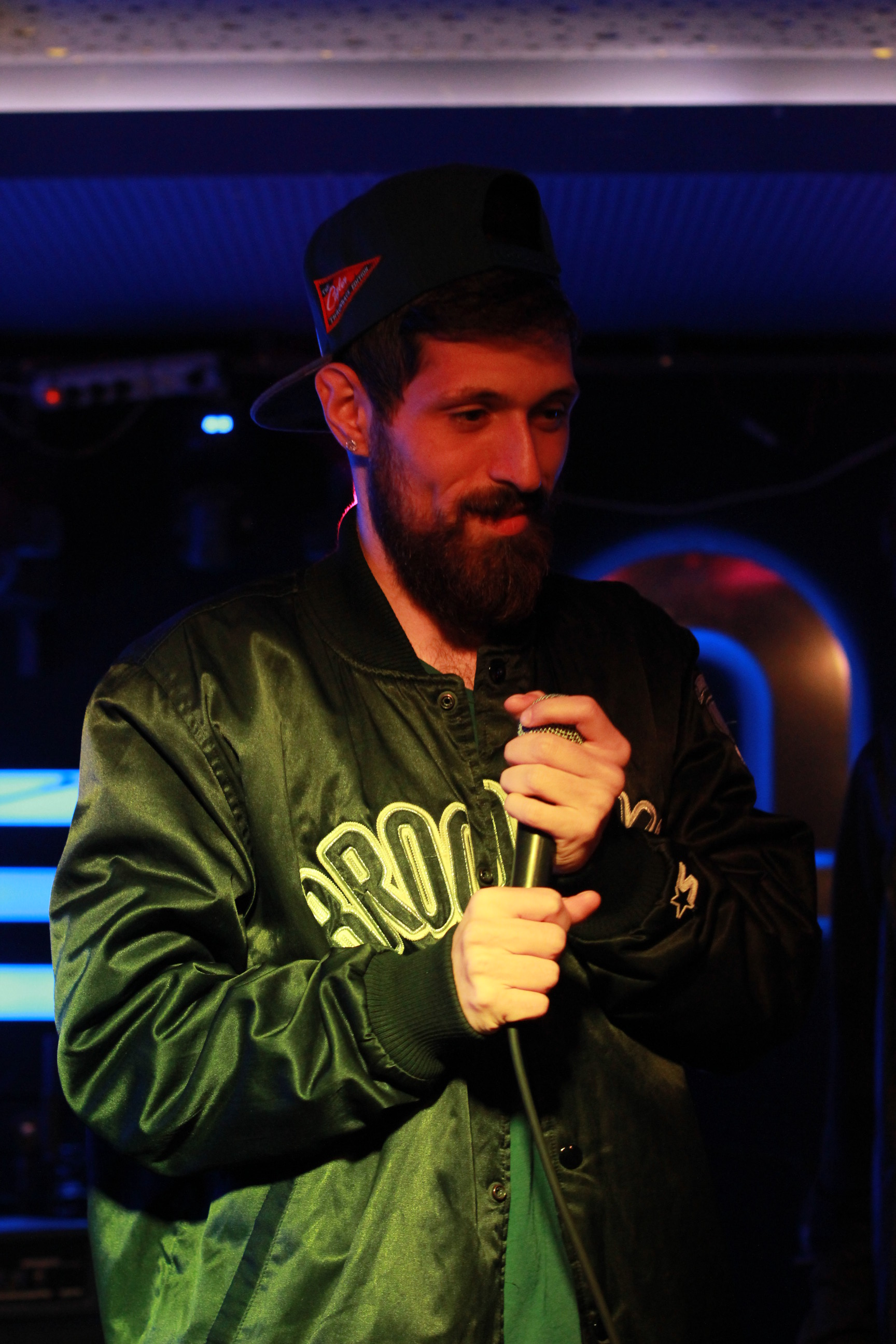
- At the Elçin Orçun’s concert in 2015

Background information
- Born: Oğuzhan Eroğlu; March 13, 1991 (age 35); Ankara, Turkey
- Origin: Turkey
- Genres: Hip hop; trap
- Occupations: Rapper; singer; songwriter
- Instrument: Vocals

Oğuzhan Eroğlu (born 13 March 1991), better known by his stage name Keişan, is a Turkish rapper, singer and songwriter. He began his career when he was 16 as solo.

== Discography ==
=== Albums ===
- Aranan Adam 2 (2019)
- Karantina (EP) (2020)
- 12 (feat. Anıl Piyancı) (2022)

=== Singles ===
- Nefret Ediyorum (2018)
- Lamborghini (2018)
- Ne Bakıyon Dayı Dayı (feat. Anıl Piyancı) (2019)
- T E S L A (Remix) (2019)
- G U C C I (Remix) (2019)
- Karanlık (2020)
- Daha Boktan (2020)
- Kim O (feat. Ben Fero) (2020)
- Ağır Ağır (2020)
- Elmas (2020)
- Yakala (feat. Redo) (2020)
- Düşerken (2020)
- İyiyim İyi (2021)
- Kasılma (feat. Dianz) (2021)
- İtfaiye (feat. Mert Şenel) (2021)
- Maşallah (feat. Arraf) (2021)
- Düşerken (Remix) (feat. Berkay Duman & Slong) (2021)
- Pare Pare (feat. Anıl Piyancı) (2022)
- Altıpatlar (feat. Reckol & Çakal) (2022)
- Kuşku (feat. Anıl Piyancı) (2022)
- Olan Oldu (ft. Ohash & Berkay Duman) (2022)
- Full Pompa (ft. Set) (2022)
- Bize Sor, Superman (2023)
- Kirlendi Tüm Duygularım (ft. Şehinşah & Anıl Piyancı) (2024)
- PAFFKUFF (2024)
- SUGARDADDY (2024)
