= Fester Abdü =

Turkish YouTube person

- Born: Ali Abdülselam Yılmaz; 1993 (age 32–33); Adana, Turkey
- Education: Çukurova University
- Occupations: YouTuber; Internet celebrity

YouTube information
- Channel: Deli Mi Ne?
- Years active: 2017–present
- Genres: Action video; comedy; vlog
- Subscribers: 10,1 million
- Views: 2.63 billion
- Last updated: 7 june 2026

Ali Abdülselam Yılmaz (born 1993), better known as Fester Abdü, is a Turkish YouTuber and the owner of Deli Mi Ne? YouTube channel. Yılmaz's channel is the 9th most-subscribed Turkish YouTube channel as of June 2020.

== Life and career ==
Yılmaz was born in 1993 in Adana. Yılmaz is a graduate of Çukurova University School of Physical Education and Sports. He is a licensed athlete of the Turkish national canoeing team.

"Deli Mi Ne?" YouTube channel was founded by Yılmaz in April 2017. In 2018, Yilmaz's participation in a running race with pink high heels and diving on the shipwreck named Majestik, which had sunk in the Battle of Çanakkale, caused reactions from various media organizations.

== Controversies ==
=== Show TV case ===
In July 2019, Yılmaz filed a lawsuit against Show TV for using his channel's videos without permission and publishing defamatory broadcasts. As a result of the lawsuit, it was reported that Show TV would pay him ₺1.43 million in non-pecuniary damages. Show TV later denied this claim.

=== 2019 UEFA Super Cup controversy ===
In August 2019, Yılmaz jumped onto the field at the 2019 UEFA Super Cup, played at Vodafone Park between two English clubs Liverpool and Chelsea. 4 other people who accompanied Yılmaz during the streak were taken into custody. As a result of these events and subsequent criticism by YouTubers such as Enes Batur as well as media outlets, the number of subscribers on his channel started to decrease.

The Istanbul Chief Public Prosecutor's Office prepared an indictment against Yılmaz in June 2020. For Yılmaz and his three friends a one to three-year prison sentence was demanded. Yılmaz is being prosecuted for entering banned areas and his friends for assisting with the crime. Yilmaz and his friends were released on probation.

== See also ==
- List of YouTubers
