= Patron (rapper) =

Turkish rapper

- Also known as: Patronflexin
- Born: Ege Erkurt; 10 January 1988 (age 38); Mersin, Turkey
- Genres: Hip hop; trap
- Occupations: Rapper; singer; songwriter
- Labels: Pasaj; PMC

Ege Erkurt (born 10 January 1988), better known by his stage name Patron, is a Turkish rapper, singer and songwriter.

== Career ==
Erkurt was born on 10 January 1988 in Mersin, Turkey. He began doing rap when he was 15. He has recorded a lot of demo in 2005. These demos have attracted attention by many websites. His big brother Saian is rapper as him.

== Discography ==
=== Underground albums ===
- Arabesque (ft. Saian) (2003)
- Aydınlık Sonrası (2006)
- Parlayan Madalyon (2006)
- Söndürülmüş Yıldızlar & Şaşal (2007)
- Yayınlanmamış Parçalardan 25 Dakikalık Mixtape (2008)

=== Studio albums ===
- Yeraltından Yeryüzüne (2009)
- Professional (2010)
- Professional 2 (2011)
- Professional 3 (2013)
- Pmc Volume One (2014)
- Boss E.P (2015)
- Professional 4 (2017)
- Totem (2018)
- Sosyopat (2018)
- Yaz Albümü (2020)
- El Patron (2021)
- Kış Uykusu (2022)

=== Singles ===
- "Kaybedecek Ne Kaldı?" (2018)
- "Benden Bu Kadar" (2019)
- "Kırgın Adımlar" (feat. FRO) (2019)
- "Mayday" (feat. Ati242) (2019)
- "Hayvan" (2019)
- "Goal" (2019)
- "Haset" (2019)
- "S.O.S" (feat. Saian) (2020)
- "Darbe" (feat. Emir Can İğrek) (2020)
- "Siyah" (feat. Sagopa Kajmer) (2020)
- "Ölümsüz" (2020)
- "Bıktım Yalanlarından" (2020)
- "Latina" (2020)
- "Sonuncu Kez" (2020)
- "Sevdik de Noldu Sanki" (2020)
- "Neyse Ne" (2021)
- "Kısasa Kısas" (2021)
- "Kafama Göre" (feat. Bora Hışır, Emboli) (2021)
- "Yandırdın Beni" (feat. FRO) (2021)
- "Bildirimler Kapalı" (feat. Astral) (2022)
- "Okyanus" (2022)
- "Hırsız" (2022)
- "GAF" (2022)
- "F En El Chat" (feat. Lemon) (2022)
- "Nefret II" (feat. Bedo, Saian) (2022)
- "Kusursuz" (feat. Alaylı, Astral) (2022)
- "Mars" (2023)
- "Hançer" (2023)
- "Orman" (feat. Uğur Öztürk) (2023)
- "Hep Bir Şeyler Eksik" (2023)
- "Tüm Dünya Vatanım" (2023)
- "Derine" (feat. Tekir) (2024)
- "Fırtına Öncesi" (2024)
- "King of Rap" (2024)
- "Risk" (2024)
- "Aşksız Adam" (2024)
- "Smashh" (2024)
- "Cebimde Bişe Var!?" (2024)
- "Deliyoo" (feat. Arda Gezer, Şehinşah) (2024)

=== As featured artist ===
Albums

- Pmc Legacy vol.1 (2019)
- Pmc Legacy vol.2 (2020)
