= Yüzyüzeyken Konuşuruz =

Alternative rock band

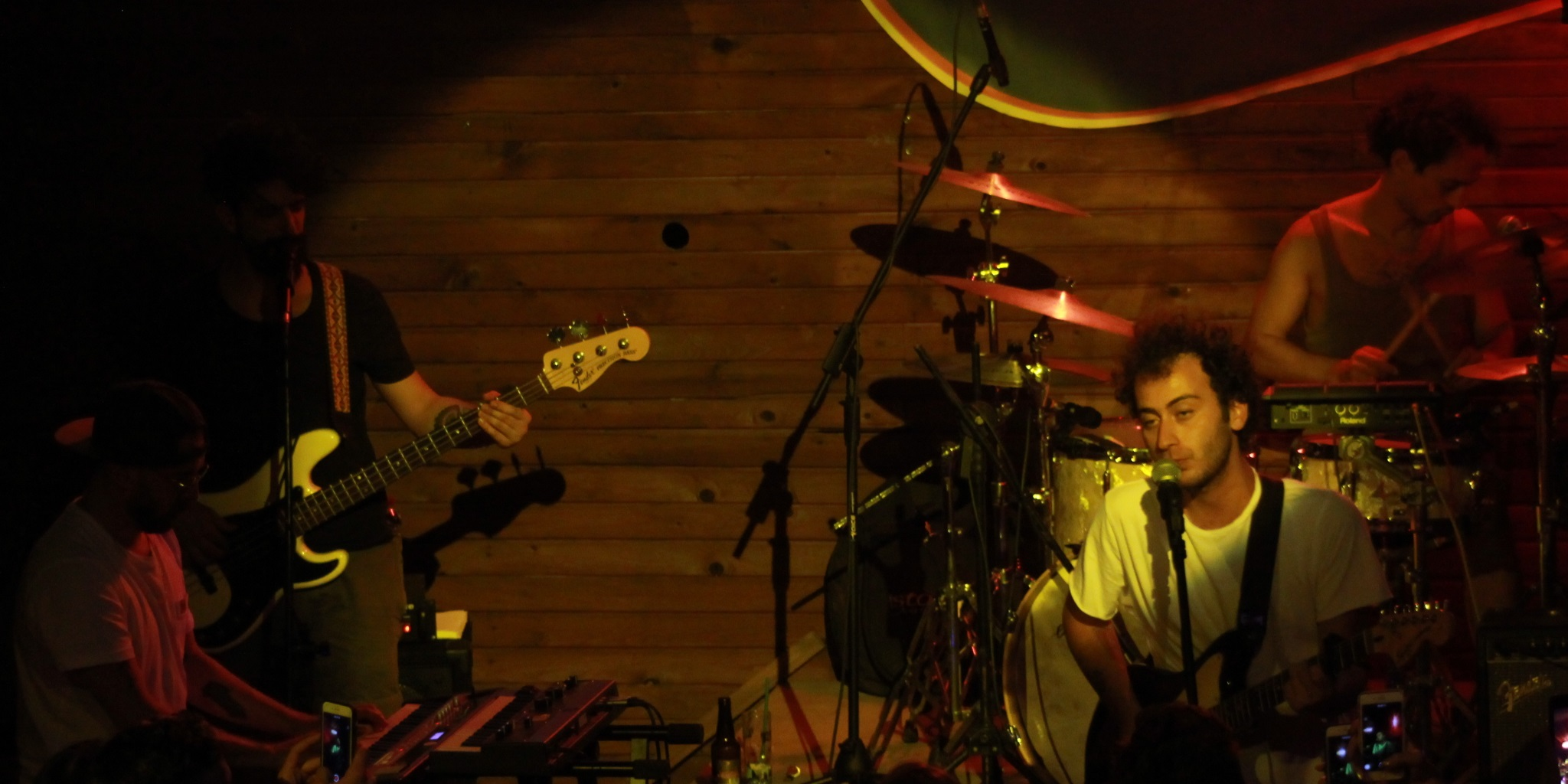

Background information
- Genres: Alternative rock
- Years active: 2011–present
- Members: S. Kaan Boşnak; Engin Sevik; Oğuz Kont; Burak Güngörmüş

Yüzyüzeyken Konuşuruz is a Turkish independent alternative rock band founded in May 2011 in Ankara, Turkey by Engin Sevik and S. Kaan Boşnak.

On April 7, 2019, they performed their biggest 5000-person concert at Bostancı Show Center. They published the preparation stages of this concert as a documentary. Their singles, Kazılı Kuyum, published on January 10, 2020, recorded at Red Bull Music Studios in New York. The records of Kazılı Kuyum, recorded as an amateur, were released on January 24.

== Discography ==
=== Albums ===
- Evdekilere Selam (2013)
- Otoban Sıcağı (2014)
- Akustik Travma (2018)
- KADER SK. (2023)

=== Singles ===
- Kaş (Otoban Sıcağı/2014)
- Dağ Serinleşir (2016)
- Ne Farkeder (2017)
- Canavar (2017)
- Sandal (2017)
- Boş Gemiler (2018)
- Ölsem Yeridir (2019)
- Kazılı Kuyum (2020)
- Sen Varsın Diye (2021)
- Son Seslenişim (2021)
- Gençliğimi Geri Ver (2022)
- Kaş II (2022)
- Durmaz Akar (2023)
- Biriyim (2024)
- Yine de (2024)
- Bürokrat (2024)

== Awards and nominations ==
Yıl	Ödül	Kategori	Sonuç
2020	46th Golden Butterfly Awards	Best Group of the Year	Won
