= Allâme =

Turkish rapper and songwriter (born 1987)

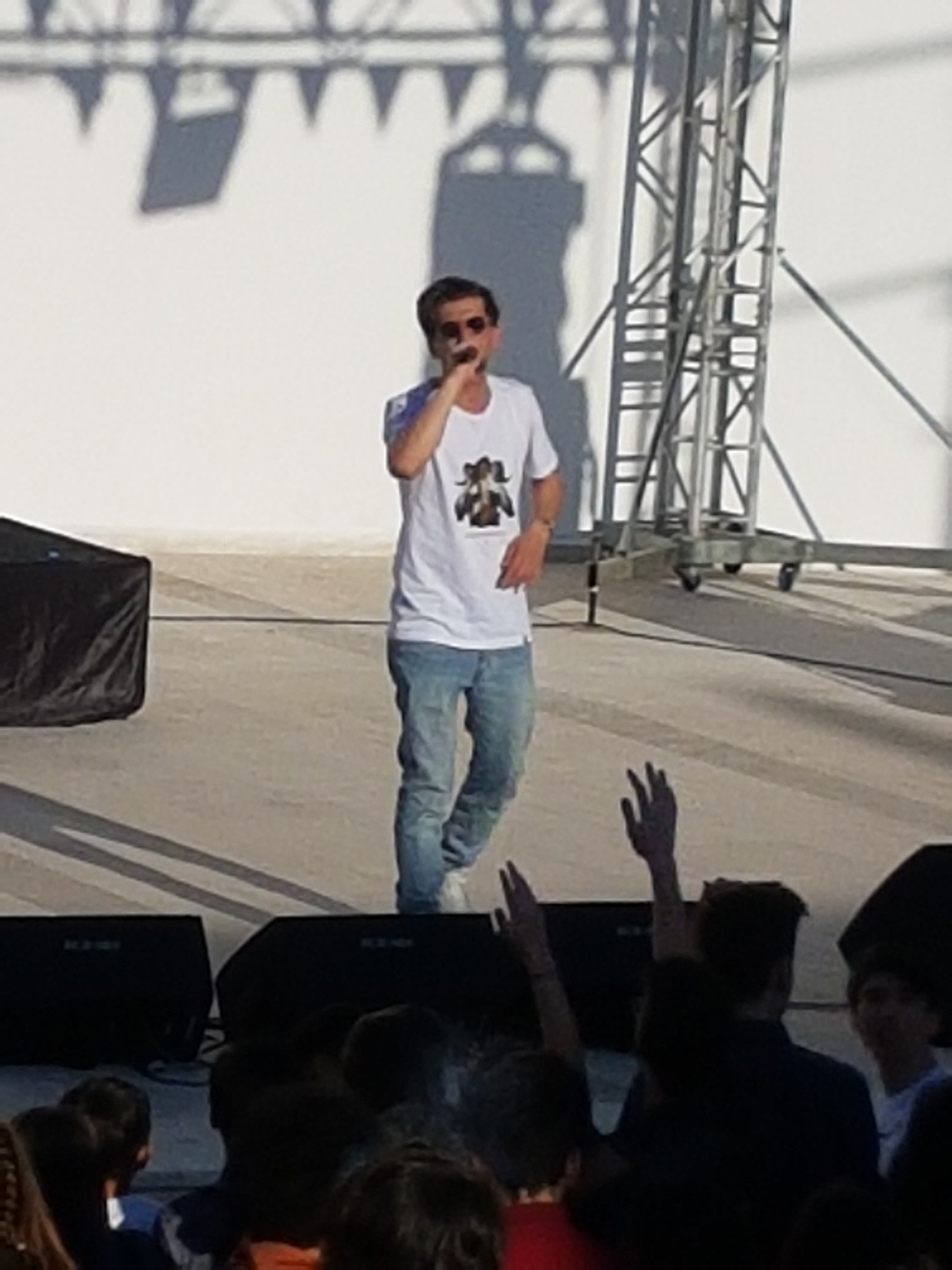
- Allâme performing on stage

Background information
- Born: Hamza Gül; 27 July 1987 (age 39); Trabzon, Turkey
- Genre: Hip hop
- Occupations: Rapper; singer; songwriter
- Instrument: Vocals

Hamza Gül (born 27 July 1987), better known by his stage name Allâme, is a Turkish rapper, singer and songwriter.

== Discography ==
=== Albums ===
Year	Title	Label	Type
2007	Aforizma	Anatolia Records	Solo album
2008	Hastalık	Anatolia Records	Solo album
2010	Fare Kapanı	Batarya Records	Solo album
2011	Manik Depresif	Batarya Records	Solo album
2012	Bir Zombinin Anatomisi	Pasaj Müzik	Solo album
2014	Savaş	Batarya Records	Solo album
2017	Anakronik	Dokuz Sekiz Müzik	Solo album
2019	Av	Sony Music Entertainment	Solo album
2020	Huzur	Batarya Records	Solo album
2021	87	Sony Music Entertainment	Solo album
2022	Riziko	DMC	Solo album
2024	Ölüm	ONELAB Music Company	Solo album

=== EPs ===
Year	Title	Label	Type
2013	Açlık	Batarya Records	EP
2021	87 Episode 1	Sony Music Entertainment	EP
2021	87 Episode 2	Sony Music Entertainment	EP

=== Instrumental albums ===
Year	Title	Label	Type
2014	The Night Instrumentals	Batarya Records	Instrumental album
2015	X Instrumentals	Batarya Records	Instrumental album
2016	Mit Instrumentals	Batarya Records	Instrumental album
2017	Y Instrumentals	DijitalDagit.im	Instrumental album
2019	Z Instrumentals	Batarya Company	Instrumental album

=== Compilation and split albums ===
Year	Title	Label	Type
2008	Her Şey Yolunda	Anatolia Records	Compilation album
2008	Senkronize	Batarya Records	Split album (with Leşker Asakir)
2010	Kurşun Batarya	Batarya Records	Compilation album
2011	Allâmonster Bootleg	Batarya Records	Compilation album
2014	Stereotype	Batarya Records	Compilation album
2021	BOOM BAP	The Maze	Split album (with Tepki)

=== Singles ===
Year	Title	Label	Type
2009	"Sapkın Ulema"	Batarya Records & Anatolia Records	Single
2012	"Kaos"	Batarya Records	Single
2012	"Dünya İnanmıyor"	Pasaj Müzik	Single (Organize Oluyoruz Vol. 2)
2014	"Bir Dakika"	Dokuz Sekiz Müzik	Single (Organize Oluyoruz Vol. 3)
2015	"Bu Senin Ellerinde"	Dokuz Sekiz Müzik	Single
2016	"Gölgeler"	Dokuz Sekiz Müzik	Single
2016	"Dayan"	Dokuz Sekiz Müzik	Single
2017	"Kısır Döngü"	Sony Music Entertainment	Single
2017	"Sevilmiyor"	Sony Music Entertainment	Single
2019	"Yanyana"	Batarya Company	Single
2019	"Yok"	Batarya Company	Single
2019	"Gece"	Batarya Company	Single
2020	"Gözlerim Görmeden"	Batarya Company	Single
2020	"Yolunu Bulsam"	Batarya Company	Single
2020	"Dünya"	Batarya Company	Single
2021	"Toprak"	Sony Music Entertainment	Single
2021	"Her Şekil Flex"	Sony Music Entertainment	Single
2021	"Yolun Sonu"	Sony Music Entertainment	Single
2022	"Yalan"	Sony Music Entertainment	Single
2022	"Lades"	Sony Music Entertainment	Single
2022	"Hep Birlikte!"	ESA Esports & Media	Single
2022	"Poz (Tirat)"	Warner Music Turkey	Single
2022	"Fil İnadı"	DMC	Single
2023	"Yaz Baştan"	ONELAB Music Company	Single
2023	"Ayık Ol"	ONELAB Music Company	Single
2023	"Tuzak"	Masta Jam Music	Single
2023	"Yabancı"	ONELAB Music Company	Single
2023	"Bumerang"	ONELAB Music Company	Single
2023	"Kaptan-ı Derya"	ONELAB Music Company	Single
2023	"Hapis"	ONELAB Music Company	Single
