= Kamufle =

Turkish rapper, songwriter and actor

- Born: Basri Fırat Bayraktar; 29 July 1988 (age 38); Fatih, Istanbul, Turkey
- Genre: Hip hop
- Occupations: Rapper; actor; singer; songwriter
- Years active: 2004–present

Basri Fırat Bayraktar (born 29 July 1988), better known by his stage name Kamufle, is a Turkish rapper, singer, songwriter and actor.

== Life ==
Bayraktar was born and raised in Fatih, Istanbul in 1988. He has played basketball and football, also he was a basketball coach.

== Career ==
He has been started doing music in 2004. His debut album Olumsuzluklar came out in 2012. After that he released his second album Hayale Daldım. At the middle of 2020, he released his last album 19T.

== Discography ==
=== Albums ===
Year	Album	Label	Notes
2008	Dutoserebrum	Dikkat Records	Split mixtape album with Sokrat ST
2010	S.O.N	Dikkat Records	Solo album
2011	Gravür	Dikkat Records	Split album with Red
2012	The Funk Poison	Dikkat Records	Solo album
2012	Olumsuzluklar	Pasaj Müzik	Solo album
2015	Hayale Daldım	Pasaj Müzik	Solo album
2020	19T	Basemode Records	Solo album
2021	Denge	Dikkat Records	Split EP with Lara Di Lara
