= Susamam =

2019 single by Şanışer

Single by Şanışer featuring Fuat Ergin, Ados, Hayki, Server Uraz, Beta, Tahribad-ı İsyan, Sokrat St, Ozbi, Deniz Tekin, Sehabe, Yeis Sensura, Aspova, Defkhan, Aga B, Mirac, Mert Şenel, and Kamufle
- Language: Turkish
- Released: 6 September 2019
- Recorded: 2019
- Genre: Hip hop, political hip hop, protest music
- Length: 14:54
- Songwriters: Şanışer and featured artists

Music video
- Video on YouTube

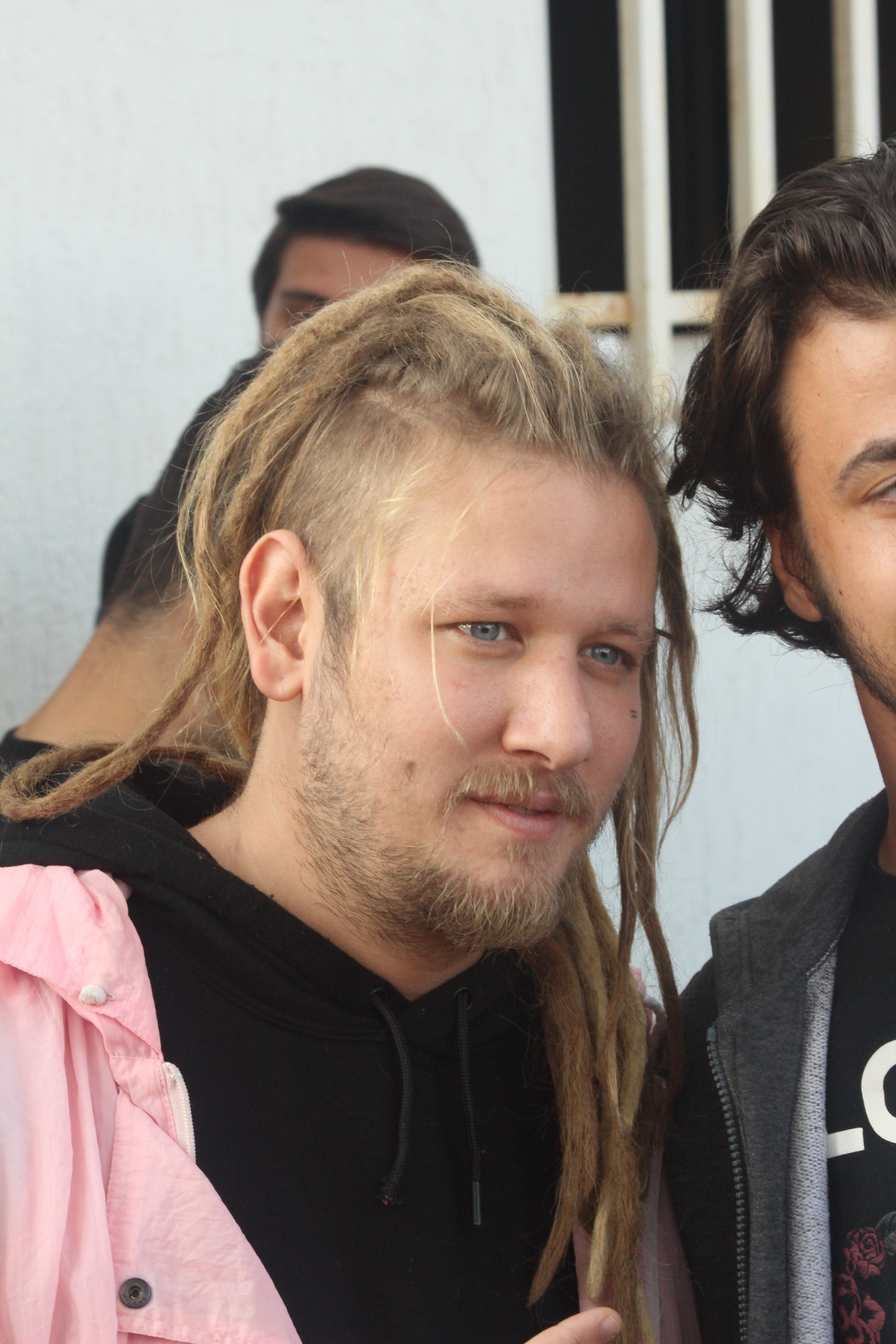
Şanışer

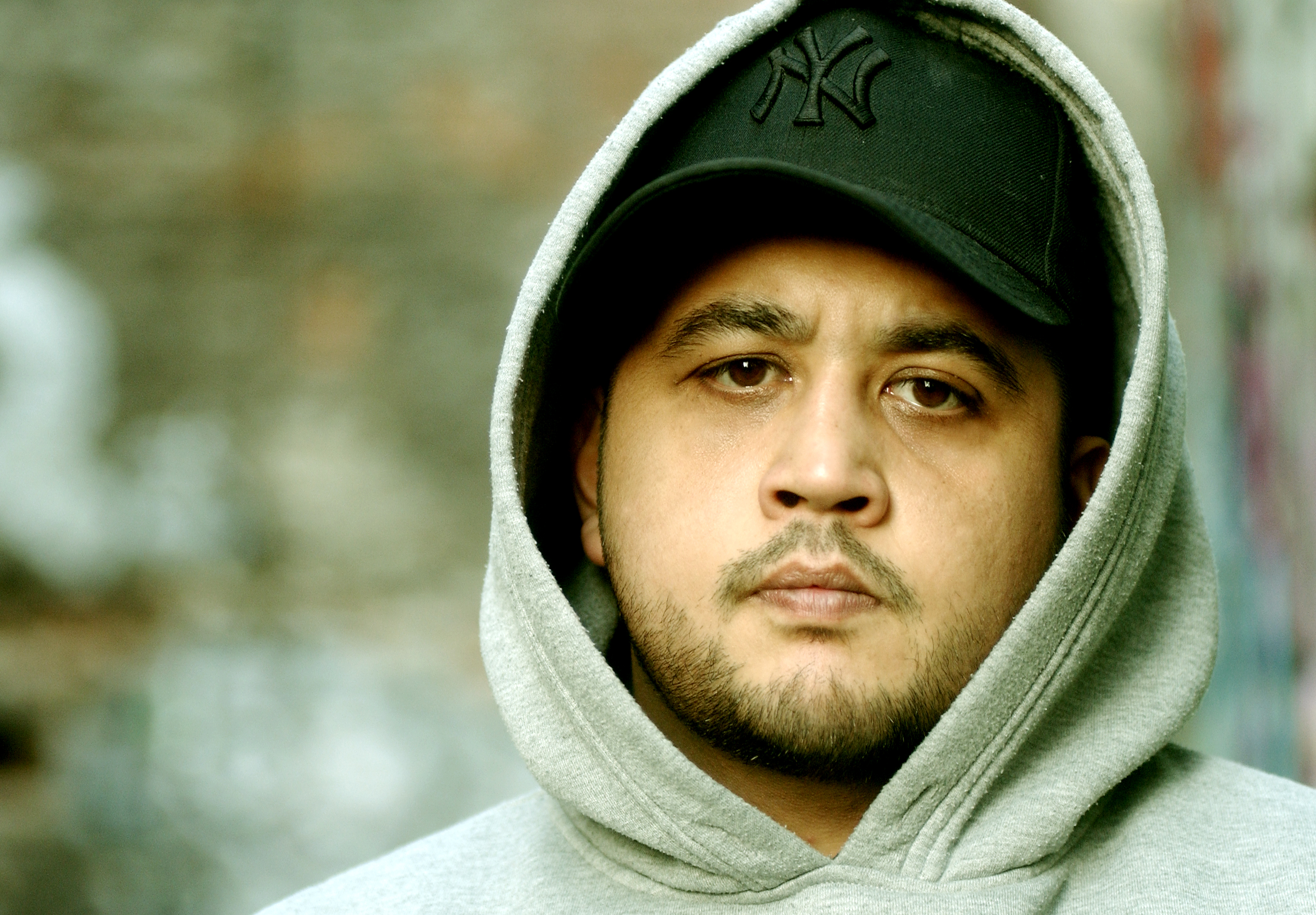
Fuat

"Susamam" (English: "I Can't Be Silent" or "I Can't Keep Quiet") is a 15-minute protest rap song featuring Turkish rappers Şanışer, Fuat Ergin, Ados, Hayki, Server Uraz, Beta, Tahribad-ı İsyan, Sokrat St, Ozbi, Deniz Tekin, Sehabe, Yeis Sensura, Aspova, Defkhan, Aga B, Mirac, Mert Şenel, and Kamufle. The song criticizes social and political issues in Turkey, including violence against women, environmental destruction, censorship, injustice, and police brutality, and became a major topic on Turkey’s public agenda in 2019.

Shortly after its release the song received positive reviews, and support from various intellectuals and social media users. The song was viewed by 20 million on YouTube in its first week of release.

Proceeds from the sale of t-shirts with #Susamam written on them as part of the project were donated to village schools.

== Topics Protested in the Song ==
Section Hashtag	Artist	Topic protested
#Nature	Fuat Ergin	Environmental pollution
#Drought	Ados	Drought
#Law	Şanışer	Injustice
#Justice	Hayki	Injustice
#Law	Server Uraz	Lawlessness
#Turkiye	Beta	Turkey's issues & refugee problems
#Istanbul	Tahribad-ı İsyan	Istanbul's issues & inequality
#Education	Sokrat St	Broken education system & college grad unemployment
#Questioning	Ozbi	Lack of questioning
#Womensrights	Deniz Tekin	Women's rights
	Sehabe and Yeis Sensura	Women's rights
#World	Aspova	World's issues
#Expatriation	Defkhan	Expatriation
#Animalrights	Şanışer	Animal rights
#Suicide	Sokrat St	Suicide
#Fascism	Aga B	Fascism
#Street	Mirac	Street workers & child workers
	Mert Senel	
#Traffic	Kamufle	Traffic accidents & traffic violence

== Reactions ==
Ruling Justice and Development Party Deputy Chairman Hamza Dağ described the song as "provocation and political manipulation" and claimed the song used "hate speech". Pro-government Turkish newspaper Yeni Şafak said the rap song was produced by terror groups.

The song received strong support from artists and journalists like Pamela Anderson, Ahmet Mümtaz Taylan, Nurgül Yeşilçay, Can Dündar, Ben Fero, Hasan Cemal, Sabahat Akkiraz, Celil Nalçakan, Hayko Cepkin, Gonca Vuslateri as well as some opposition politicians, including the mayor of Şişli, Istanbul.

On the same day of the release of Susamam, another famous Turkish rapper Ezhel —who has been living in Germany due to concerns over arrest— released his single Olay ("Event") about 2016 Turkish coup attempt, Gezi Park protests and other political events occurred in the country.

== Music Video ==
The video clip begins by a female robotic voice criticizing the idea that music should only exist for entertainment while Şanışer walking wearing a baseball cap. It presents the artists’ belief that music should also speak about social problems and inspire change, calling on viewers to "come with us" and help change things.

The video contains 20 different issues being discussed by 19 different MCs (or Master of Ceremonies). Each section starts with a hashtag.

In the #Law section, the video criticizes a privileged and negligent White Turk figure for ignoring social injustices, killing of children by police. The scene shows him becoming fearful of both the police and even expressing his opinions on twitter at the moment, as he is now experiencing the same situations he previously ignored. While in jail, he won't be able to get any help, "If they wrongfully arrest you one night, you won't even be able to find a journalist to write about it. They are all in jail". He also states:"You forgot the name of the judge, who released Tugce and Busra's killers!", referring to the release of murderers of two 10 year old cousins.

In the #Justice section, Hayki states, "We can’t even afford what your dog won’t eat," criticizing economic inequality and social injustice. He also condemns police violence, saying that the police should not be able to "pull out a gun and shoot whoever they want in broad daylight." Later in the verse he says: "Hate is your weapon" and "Our weapon is our words". This message matches the imagery used in the song’s banner, which depicts butterflies emerging from the mouth of a skeleton soldier holding a machine gun, symbolizing words and art overcoming violence.

The #Womensrights section contains real footage depicting violence against women. Deniz Tekin highlights that she is "lucky" to not have been murdered or subjected to forced marriage, physical abuse, or confinement in her own home.

The section becomes more direct and memorial-like as it transitions into a list of names of women who were murdered by men in Turkey in the last decade, including Münevver Karabulut whose body was dismembered by her wealthy boyfriend, Şule Çet and Emine Bulut.

In continuation of the section, Sehabe and Yeis sensura say: "Yes, they are men, but they aren't human", referring to men who use violence against women.

In the #Istanbul section Tahribad-ı İsyan, a rapper duo mentions "archaic dinosaur politicians" governing the city, and describe how living in a "concrete jungle" normalizes becoming an "animal" yourself. They end the section with "Don't be silent or you will be next" --which is a common slogan in Turkey's protests--.

In the #Education section Socrat St mentions how easy it is to buy diplomas and how difficult it is to find a job as a college grad, with many ending up working as cashiers.
