= Hayki =

- Born: Ragıp Aytuğ Tunal; 14 April 1983 (age 43); Istanbul, Turkey
- Genre: Hip hop
- Occupations: Rapper; singer; songwriter

Ragıp Aytuğ Tunal (born 14 April 1983), better known by his stage name Hayki, is a Turkish rapper, singer and songwriter. He established a music company called PMC with other Turkish rappers, Patron and Da Poet. In 2017, he Published a song called B1R. He had to leave PMC after having some problems with his old friend Patron. He established the music company "Unique Fabric".

== Life ==
=== Early life ===
Hayki (Ragıp Aytuğ Tunal) was born in the Hasanpaşa neighborhood of the Kadıköy district of Istanbul, where he lived for 27 years.

=== Musical career ===
In order to record his tracks he established home-studio, which he had continued to use until 2004 before he went to do his mandatory military service. After that, he established the musical group İhtilal along with the other two artists Garez and Kaplan. After 4 years of working with this group he left. After leaving İhtilal he kept working solo for a while and he took part in many concerts and organizations. After making duets with many other known artists, he established another music company called PMC studios with Da poet and Patron, working with many other artists under this establishment. He made the album Birkaç Milyar Soluk in 2012, and PMC VOLUME I in 2014 along with other various members of PMC. His popularity was brought to bigger masses after making the song "B1R" in 2017. He left PMC due to various reasons in 2018 and made an album named OL under the record label Basemode. He established his own record label named Unique Fabric in 2019 and made the albums Kötü Adam (Ajna) in 2020, Unique in 2022, and Equipe in 2023 under Unique Fabric.

== Discography ==
=== Albums and EPs ===
- SSSS (2008)
- Paşa Rhyme (2008)
- High Kick Low Punch (2009)
- Bilinmeyen Artizzzler (ft. Şehinşah & Fieber) (2010)
- Bir Kaç Milyar Soluk (2012)
- PMC Volume One (ft. Patron) (2014)
- 2005-2015 Compilation (2017)
- Ol (2018)
- Kötü Adam (Ajna) (2020)
- Unique (2022)
- Equipe (2023)

=== Singles and duets ===
- Uyuyorum Bi' Dakka (ft. Fünye) (2006)
- Click Dann (2007)
- Eyvah (ft. Da Poet) (2008)
- Zıpla Bunaldığında (ft. Patron) (2010)
- Madalyon (ft. Grogi & Nomad) (2011)
- Manifesto (ft. Allâme) (2012)
- Sürgün (ft. Patron) (2013)
- Ego (ft. Patron & Anıl Piyancı) (2013)
- Kara Para (ft. Anıl Piyancı & Defkhan & Allâme) (2016)
- Tablo (ft. Yener Çevik & Eypio) (2016)
- Uzay (ft. Onur Uğur & Patron) (2017)
- B1R (2017)
- Katil (ft. Eypio) (2017)
- Tarih (ft. Aspova) (2019)
- Kargalar (2019)
- Katliam 3 (ft. Massaka, Anıl Piyancı, Dr. Fuchs, Tekmill, Yener Çevik, Canbay & Wolker, Diablo63, Şanışer, Sansar Salvo, Defkhan, Sir-Dav, Rota) (2019)
- Susamam (ft. Şanışer, Fuat Ergin, Ados, Server Uraz, Beta, Tahribad-ı İsyan, Sokrat St, Ozbi, Deniz Tekin, Sehabe, Yeis Sensura, Aspova, Defkhan, Aga B, Mirac, Mert Şenel, Kamufle) (2019)
- Söylesene (ft. Behz) (2019)
- Kol Bozuk (2019)
- Tahammülüm Yok (2019)
- Dolunay (2019)
- Ofsayt (2019)
- Deli (2019)
- Gömelim mi (ft. Olvi) (2019)
- Panter (ft. Omero) (2020)
- Fareli Köyün Kavalcısı (2020)
- UF! (ft. Omero & GOKO! & Olvi & Fredd & Simurg) (2020)
- ŞIKIR ŞIKIR (2020)
- Doğru Kötüler Yanlış İyiler (2020)
- Kay Kay (ft. Eypio) (2020)
- Turkish Nightmare (ft. Uzi & Motive & Eko Fresh & Killa Hakan) (2020)
- Seni De Vururlar (2021)
- Koma Beni El Yerine (2021)
- Elmas (ft. Omero) (2021)
- MANTRA (2021)
- Bedel (ft. Rota) (2021)
- Bu Son (ft. Fredd) (2021)
- Bir Şansım Var (ft. Can Kazaz) (2021)
- Zirve 2 ft. (Rota & Defkhan & Burak King & Hayki & Yener Çevik)
- Jeton (ft. Kezzo)
- Rüzgar (ft. Ceza)
