= Da Crime Posse =

Da Crime Posse was one well-known group in the genre of Turkish hip hop in Germany. The group was composed of one Turkish people (M.Ali), one German person (Olcay/Ole), and one Cuban person (Babalu). In his essay addressing the development of hip-hop in Germany, author Timothy S. Brown suggests that many musical groups in Germany are adopting a sort of “symbolic ethnicity” which asserts that one “does not necessarily have to be Turkish” to assume the Turkish identity. Furthermore, a scholar named Dietmar Elfein has cited Da Crime Posse as an example of how the “Turkish identity proposed is a mythological one” in the sense that one did not necessarily have to be Turkish to assume this symbolic ethnicity. Perhaps one of the most important musical collaborations that Da Crime Posse has taken part in has been that with Karakan and Erci E. Cina-i Sebeke (of Da Crime Posse) was the individual who met fellow Turkish hip-hop artists Karakan and Erci-E and spurred their musical collaboration. Together, they established the legendary group Cartel and released a compilation album in 1995. The only single from their self-titled album, composed by Big Porno Ahmet, brought the biggest success in the history of Turkish hip-hop. With this unexpected success, they achieved Gold and Platinum status (plus many more awards) by selling more than 2,250,000 copies.

It was being the hip-hop formation from Kiel.
