= Motive (rapper) =

Turkish rapper

- Born: Tolga Can Serbes; 24 March 2000 (age 26); Istanbul, Turkey
- Origin: Turkey
- Genres: Hip hop; trap
- Occupations: Rapper; songwriter

Tolga Can Serbes (Turkish pronunciation: [ˈtolɡa dʒan sɛɾˈbɛs]; born 24 March 2000), better known by his stage name Motive, is a Turkish rapper and songwriter. He began his music career in 2015 with the group Dope Boys. After the group disbanded in 2016, he continued his solo work and joined the 832 Yanyol collective. He later worked with MOB Entertainment.

== Life and career ==
He first gained widespread recognition through his work with Tepki, joining MOB Entertainment and releasing "Çekmece Flow" in 2018 alongside Tepki, Stap, Modd, and Rüzgar.

In February 2019, he released his first EP, Output Nr.1. In April of the same year, he released the diss track "Trash", directed at Turkish rapper Joker.

Motive released his debut studio album, Makaveli, on 11 September 2020. The album was expanded with additional tracks in December of the same year.

During this period, he also collaborated with various other rappers. In 2021, he featured alongside UZI, Aksan, Güneş and Modd on the track "Mektup", which was dedicated to Vio, a Turkish rapper and member of MOB Entertainment, who died of heart failure in 2018. That same year, he released the tracks "Takip" and "Ömrüm", the latter featuring Lil Murda. In June 2021, he left MOB Entertainment alongside UZI and Aksan due to tensions within the label.

In January 2022, he released his second studio album, 22, as part of the SAVANA collective. The album reached number six on the Spotify Top Albums Debut Global chart in the week of its release. In May, he featured on Cem Yenel's single "Devam Et", produced by Volga Tamöz. Later that year, he released singles such as "Hotbox", "Zoo Park", "Sherlock Holmes (Tirat)" and "Totem". In October 2022, he collaborated with Jefe on an EP titled Chorba. His single "10MG", released in November, became one of his most widely streamed songs and topped the charts in Turkey.

In 2023, Motive released the singles "Randevu", "Gang", "Gospel" and "Yan Yana". On 16 June 2023, he released the studio album, Romantik. The album became the most-streamed album on Spotify Turkey in 2023. In the same year, he released the EP Eclipse (Original Soundtrack) and the single "A La Carte". Romantik won Album of the Year at the 10th Golden Palm Awards, while Motive won the Best Rap/Hip-Hop Artist award at the 20th Radio Boğaziçi Music Awards.

In January 2024, Motive released the single "pVg (Para ve Gözyaşları transl. Money and Tears)". He released the taycan v1 album on 25 April and the album taycan on 1 November. His song "pVg" was nominated for Song of the Year, while he was also nominated for Rapper of the Year at the 2024 Golden Butterfly Awards.

In 2025, Motive released the tracks "Pingui", "Surf", "Karanlık", "Bellydance" and ‘"quafina". He also collaborated with UZI on the tracks "Şarkılar Sokaklara Ait" and "Ismarla".

In January 2026, Motive and UZI released their collaborative album Mortal Kombat. The nine-track album included "Trap House", "Cennet" and "YIN YANG". Following its release, several tracks entered Spotify's daily Top 10 in Turkey. On 26 January, "Ou" reached number one, while "Trap House" peaked at number four and "Cennet" at number three. "YIN YANG" later topped Spotify's daily charts in Turkey and Cyprus on 27 February 2026. "Şarkılar Sokaklara Ait", which had been released as a single in October 2025, had also reached number one on Spotify's daily chart in Turkey.

In March 2026, Motive collaborated with Hadise on a performance of her song "Küçük Bir Yol" as part of Red Bull's Track Takeover project. The two later released "Labirent" in April, which was included on Hadise's album H.. In July, Motive collaborated with the girl group Manifest and producer Pango on "pVg (Manifest Live Remix)", following their performance of the song at Manifestival.

On 19 June 2026, he released his album PASAJ. The 14-track album featured collaborations with Jefe, M Lisa, Murda, M Huncho, Reckol, and Khontkar. The album includes tracks such as "DVD", "MANDALINA", "ARD", "ŞEHRİME BOMBALAR" and "YIN YANG".

== Discography ==
=== Studio albums ===
- PASAJ (2026)
- taycan (2024)
- taycan v1 (2024)
- ROMANTİK (2023)
- 22 (2022)
- Makaveli (Deluxe) (2020)
- Makaveli (2020)

=== EPs ===
- CHORBA (with Jefe) (2022)
- Output Nr.1 (2019)

=== Singles and collaborations ===
- Akila (2026)
- ANAKONDA'S (with UZI) (2026)
- YIN YANG (2026)
- ŞEHRİME BOMBALAR (2026)
- ARD (with M Lisa) (2026)
- MANDALINA (with Jefe) (2026)
- DVD (2026)
- FLEX (2026)
- Labirent (with Hadise) (2026)
- Küçük Bir Yol (with Hadise) (2026)
- pVg (Manifest Live Remix) (with Manifest and Pango) (2026)
- karambol (with Murda) (2026)
- Ismarla (with UZI) (2025)
- Şarkılar Sokaklara Ait (with UZI) (2025)
- AQUAFINA (2025)
- Shaw (Remix) (with ER2) (2025)
- Bellydance (2025)
- KARANLIK (with Yung Kafa & Küçük Efendi and Jumpa) (2025)
- SURF (with Murda) (2025)
- PINGUI (with Jefe and Ohash, featuring BAO, Bar B and Bekom) (2025)
- pVg (2024)
- Say Goodbye 2.0 (with UFO361 and Yung Kafa & Küçük Efendi) (2024)
- GANG (with Cairo and Narco) (2023)
- RANDEVU (2023)
- ECLIPSE (with Pango) (2023)
- A La Carte (with Kleo and Segah) (2023)
- Yan Yana (with Uğur Öztürk and Jefe) (2023)
- Gospel (with Ohash) (2023)
- Ömrüm (with Murda) (2021)
- Takip (2021)
- Mektup (with UZI, Aksan and Güneş) (2021)
- O La La (with GOKO! and Critical) (2021)
- Ziyafet (Seri Katiller 5) (with Asil Slang) (2021)
- Yüce Aşk (2020)
- 7. Gün (with Tepki and Rota) (2020)
- Spots and Shadows (with Merkules) (2020)
- Mis Gibi (with UZI) (2019)
- Çekmece Flow (with Tepki, Stap, Modd and Rüzgar) (2018)

== Awards ==
Year	Award	Category	Nominee	Result
2022	Power Music Awards	Best Collaboration	"Devam Et"	Nominee
2023	10th Golden Palm Awards	Album of the Year	"Romantik"	Won
2023	20th Radio Boğaziçi Music Awards	Best Rap/Hip-Hop Artist	Motive	Won
2024	50th Golden Butterfly Awards	Rapper of the Year	Motive	Nominee
2024	50th Golden Butterfly Awards	Song of the Year	"pVg"	Nominee
