= Beta Berk Bayındır =

- Born: Istanbul
- Died: April 25, 2022 (aged 32)
- Genres: Hip hop, rap
- Occupations: Singer, rapper, actor, songwriter
- Years active: 2006 – 2022
- Labels: Olympos, Epidemik
- Website: http://betaberkbayindir.com

Beta Berk Bayındır, also known by the stage names Beta or 3B, was a Turkish rapper and songwriter.

== Life and Career ==
Bayındır was born on September 9, 1989, in Istanbul.

Bayındır studied acting at the theater department of Kadir Has University. He acted in the television series Krem and Paramparça. He was interested in rap from a young age. In 2004, he released his first album, A2BT. In 2005, he released his work Cümle Alem. During these years, he also began performing on stage. In 2006, he joined the group Antisistem with Batuğ. He became more well-known with the album Pişti in 2008.

By 2016, Bayındır had become popular with tracks like Ebenin A*ı and Dolunay. In 2016, he began working with the music label Epidemik, owned by his rapper friend Server Uraz, and created a 22-track compilation album called Best of Beta. In 2019, he released a single titled Thirty under the Epidemik label. He took part in the Susamam ("I can't keep quiet") project in 2019.

Bayındır died on April 25, 2022 after falling from the 8th floor of the residence where he lived in Kağıthane, Istanbul.
