= Aziza A. =

- Born: Alev Yıldırım; 1971 (age 54–55)
- Origin: Berlin, Germany
- Genre: Turkish hip-hop
- Occupations: Singer-songwriter, performer
- Years active: 1997–present
- Website: Official site

Alev Yıldırım (born 1971), known professionally as Aziza A., is a Turkish-German hip-hop performer, actress and presenter.

She was born in Berlin in 1971 to parents of Turkish origin.

== Discography ==
- 1996: Breaking Walls
- 1997: Es ist Zeit (Orient Express/BMG)
- 2002: Kendi Dünyam (Double Moon)

== Contributions to film soundtracks ==
- Hiz (Lola und Bilidikid, 1999)
- Kendi Yolun & Deniz (Bavaria, 2003)
- Hayat (Eine andere Liga, 2004)
