= Dolu Kadehi Ters Tut =

Turkish alternative rock band

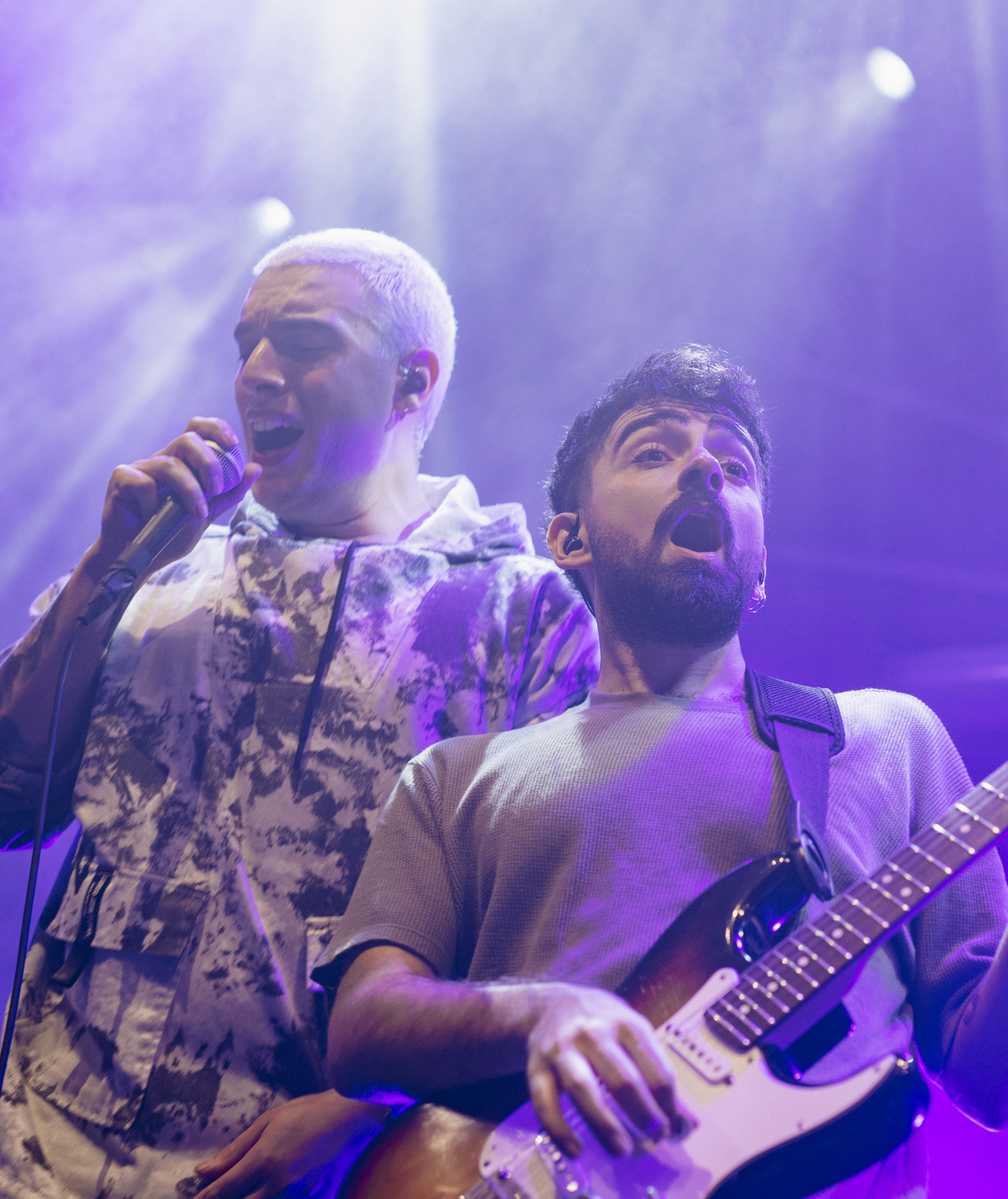
- Ava and Özay performing in Istanbul

Background information
- Genres: Alternative rock, pop rock
- Years active: 2014–present
- Members: Mehmet Uğurhan Özay; Mürsel Oğulcan Ava

Dolu Kadehi Ters Tut (lit. 'Hold the Full Glass Upside Down') are a Turkish pop rock duo consisting of vocalist Uğurhan Özay and guitarist Mürsel Oğulcan Ava founded in 2014. The first album Polonya’nın Başı Belada (2015) was a home-recorded album. Their first studio album Dünyanın En İyi Albümü was released in 2017. Their funk rock and alternative rock albums are inspired by the works of Red Hot Chili Peppers and Twenty One Pilots. Their self-produced 5 albums, 3 EP and 12 singles have been released on digital platforms.

The group got its name from a verse in Omar Khayyam's No. 27 Rubaʿi. Most of the duo's music videos, which are made in the mini-film format, have been directed by Mürsel Oğulcan Ava. The majority of their compositions were inspired by the works of Sabahattin Ali and Özdemir Asaf.

== History ==
The group's original name was "Lavuks". After releasing their self-recorded acoustic album Polonya’nın Başı Belada, they published their first music video "Aldattın Mı" on 4 February 2016, followed by a single, titled "#22", on 14 November 2016. Also in 2016, the due began performing acoustic songs as a band in various places. Their second single, "Unut Ama Sev", was released in early 2017. Their third single, "Anamız Babamız Yok Deriz", addressed issues such as homophobia and social pressures. It was followed by another single, titled "Evim". They attracted more attention by the song "Belki" and is music video, which featured Can Ozan and Deniz Tekin. Their first studio album Dünyanın En İyi Albümü, consisting of 11 songs, was released on 3 November 2017. The songs "Tehlikeli İkilem" and "Çöpçatan" from this album were turned into music videos.

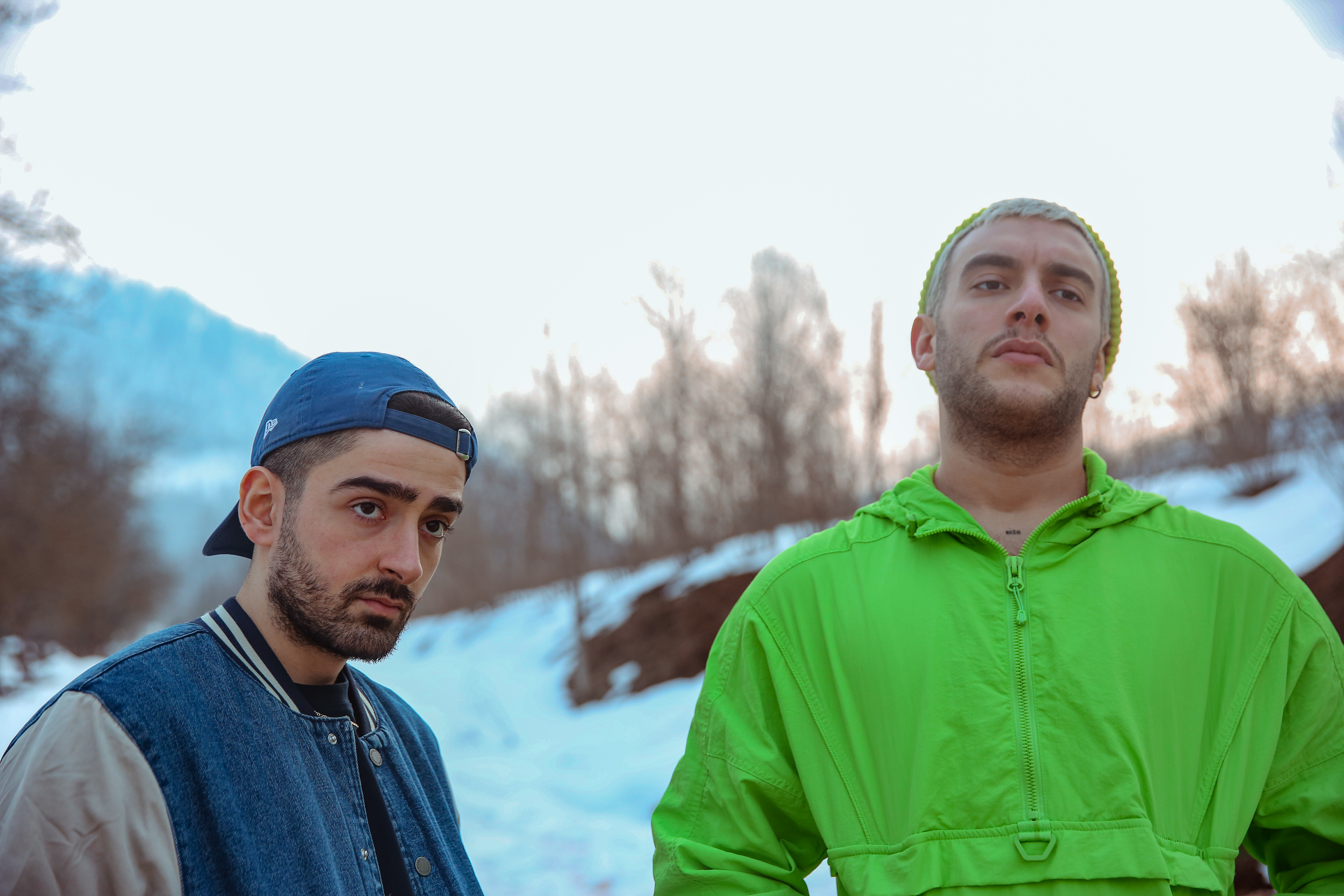
Mürsel Oğulcan Ava and Uğurhan Özay during a photo shoot

In 2018, the duo collaborated with Can Ozan on the song "Aklım Hep Firarda" which was released in February 2018. On 15 March 2018, the group had its first appearance on the mainstream media by appearing on Akustikhane program. In the same month, together with Dilan Balkay, they released the song "Siz Bana Aldırmayın". Following its release, Dilan Balkay started accompanying the group as trumpeter on their live stage performances. The due received the "Best Debut by a Group" award at the Mustafa Kemal Culture and Arts Awards, organized by Vefa High School. In the same year, Yağız Nevzat İpek joined the group by playing drums during their live performances. For the cover of their next single, "Anlamı Yok", they used the Pale Blue Dot photograph taken by Voyager 1. On 21 September 2018, their released their EP Akustik Takılmacalar, consisting of 7 songs. Sedef Sebüktekin was the featured artist on the song "Sen ve Ben" from this EP. Soon Billur Battal joined the group as a backing vocalist for their live performances.

On 5 April 2019, their next studio album, Karanlık, was released. Sedef Sebüktekin was again a featured artist in this worked and voiced the song "Gitme" with the due. The album was described by the due as "Our first album where we could really do what we wanted to do". Mixing of the pieces was done by Barış Ergün, while mastering was done by Vlado Meller, who had previously worked on Red Hot Chili Peppers's albums Californication, By the Way and Stadium Arcadium. In the same year, Bahadır Kartal joined the group on base and electric guitar. The group received the Best Alternative Music Group of the Year award at the Face to Face event organized by Kocaeli University in the same year.

After releasing another single, "Kaçar Gider", on 28 February 2020, the band published their first cover song "Duvar" as a part of Ezginin Günlüğü's 40 Yıllık Şarkılar tribute album. Their tenth single, "Neyin Nesi", was released on 1 May 2020.

== Discography ==
Albums

- Polonya'nın Başı Belada (2015)
- Dünyanın En İyi Albümü (2017)
- Karanlık (2019)
- DKTT (2021)
- Ölüm Dansı (2023)

EPs

- Akustik Takılmacalar (2018)
- Remix Takılmacalar (2020)
- DKTT Live Session (Live Version) (2021)
- Ölüm Dansı: Kısım 1 (2023)

Singles

- "#22" (2016)
- "Unut Ama Sev" (2017)
- "Anamız Babamız Yok Deriz" (2017)
- "Evim" (2017)
- "Belki" ft. Deniz Tekin, Can Ozan (2017)
- "Aklım Hep Firarda" ft. Can Ozan (2018)
- "Siz Bana Aldırmayın" ft. Dilan Balkay (2018)
- "Anlamı Yok" (2018)
- "Kaçar Gider" (2020)
- "Duvar" (2020)
- "Neyin Nesi" (2020)
- ″#25″ (2020)
- ″Islansın″ (2021)
- ″Yangın″ (2021)
- ″Bu Bok″ (2021)
- "Zor" ft. Dilan Balkay (2021)
- "Öylece Durdun" (2021)
- "Yüksek" ft. Seda Erciyes (2021)
- "Hiç İyi Değilim" (2022)
- "#27" (2022)
- "Bir Bildiğin Vardır" (2022)
- "Sana Bu Kadar Uzakken" (2022)
- "Bayılırız Deliliğe" ft. Ozbi (2023)
- "Olabilirdik" ft. Selin (2023)
- "Dilerim Ki" (2024)
- "Ölene Dek" ft. Can Ozan (2024)
- "Yan Yana" (2024)
- “Yandım” (2024)
- “Sahte Dualar” (2025)
- “Nereye Kadar” (2025)
- “Bizi Bırakma” (2025)

Music videos
| Year | Title | Length | Director | Producer |
|---|---|---|---|---|
| 2016 | Aldattın Mı | 3:55 | Mürsel Oğulcan Ava | Dolu Kadehi Ters Tut |
| 2017 | #22 | 3:29 | Mürsel Oğulcan Ava | Dolu Kadehi Ters Tut |
| 2017 | Anamız Babamız Yok Deriz | 4:13 | Mürsel Oğulcan Ava | Dolu Kadehi Ters Tut |
| 2017 | Belki | 3:51 | Mürsel Oğulcan Ava | Dolu Kadehi Ters Tut |
| 2017 | Tehlikeli İkilem | 4:16 | Mürsel Oğulcan Ava | Dolu Kadehi Ters Tut |
| 2018 | Aklım Hep Firarda | 3:19 | Cahit Kaya Demir | Dolu Kadehi Ters Tut |
| 2018 | Yardım Et | 5:06 | Mürsel Oğulcan Ava | Dolu Kadehi Ters Tut |
| 2019 | Karanlık | 4:05 | Mürsel Oğulcan Ava | Dolu Kadehi Ters Tut |
| 2020 | Duvar | 3:19 | Tunahan Emre Bilgin | Dokuz Sekiz Müzik |
| 2021 | Islansın | 3:58 | Mürsel Oğulcan Ava | Hype Productions |
| 2021 | Bu Bok | 3:19 | Mali Ergin | Hype Productions |
| 2021 | Yoksun | 2:35 | İlay Alpgiray | Hype Productions |
| 2021 | Yüksek | 3:17 | | Dolu Kadehi Ters Tut |
| 2022 | Bir Bildiğin Vardır | 3:42 | Cahit Kaya Demir | SMF Productions |
| 2022 | Bayılırız Deliliğe | 3:26 | Barış Murathanoğlu | SMF Productions |
| 2023 | Olabilirdik | 3:47 | Cahit Kaya Demir | SMF Productions |
