= Cartel (hip-hop album) =

Studio album by Cartel
- Released: 1995
- Genre: Hip hop
- Label: Mercury Records
- Producer: Ozan Sinan

Cartel chronology
Cartel (1995)	Bugünkü Neşen Cartel'den (2010)

Cartel is a German hip hop album released in 1995 featuring various artists of Turkish descent. The compilation contains five tracks by Nuremberg artist Karakan, three songs from the Kiel group Da Crime Posse, three songs by Erci E. from West Berlin and a communal recording by all of the artists entitled Cartel.

Spyce Records facilitated the recording of this album under the supervision of their manager Ozan Sinan. Cartel was initially released by Mercury/Polygram, and by RAKS/Polygram in Turkey. The Turkish market consumed over 300,000 copies, providing for widespread notoriety for each of the contributing artists. The German-Turkish community also received the album enthusiastically, although only 20,000 copies were sold within Germany.

Album manager Oznan Sinan justifies this symbolism by stating that "Our target-group are the Turks not the German society". Similarly, the beats were enriched with samples from Turkish folk music and attempted to unify an ethnic minority within Germany.

== Track listing ==
No.	Title	Writer(s)	Singer(s)	Length
1.	"Cartel"	Abdurrahman İnce, Ahmet Ölmez İşçitürk, Ali Aksoy, Alper Tunga Köksal, Erci Ergün, Kerim Yüzer, Miguel Perelló, Ole Peter Jeß	Cartel	4:06
2.	"Çek Bir Fırt"	Ahmet Ölmez İşçitürk, Alper Tunga Köksal, Kerim Yüzer	Karakan	4:21
3.	"Party"	Erci Ergün	Erci E	4:11
4.	"Hani Bana Para"	Ahmet Ölmez İşçitürk, Alper Tunga Köksal, Kerim Yüzer	Karakan	4:47
5.	"Yetmedi mi?"	Abdurrahman İnce, Ali Aksoy	Da Crime Posse	7:34
6.	"Evdeki Ses"	Ahmet Ölmez İşçitürk, Alper Tunga Köksal, Kerim Yüzer	Karakan	2:48
7.	"Sen Türksün"	Erci Ergün	Erci E	3:45
8.	"Araba Yok"	Ahmet Ölmez İşçitürk, Alper Tunga Köksal, Kerim Yüzer	Karakan	4:16
9.	"Posse Attack"	Abdurrahman İnce, Ali Aksoy, Miguel Perelló, Ole Peter Jeß	Da Crime Posse	4:50
10.	"Kankardeşler"	Ahmet Ölmez İşçitürk, Alper Tunga Köksal, Kerim Yüzer	Karakan	3:52
11.	"Televizyon"	Erci Ergün	Erci E	3:56
12.	"Der Weg den du gehst"	Ali Aksoy, Ole Peter Jeß	Da Crime Posse	5:10
