= Uzi (Turkish rapper) =

Turkish singer

UZI
- Also known as: Uzi El Chavo; El Chavo; Uzi212
- Born: Utku Cihan Yalçınkaya; August 30, 1998 (age 28); Güngören, Istanbul, Turkey
- Origin: Turkey
- Genres: Hip hop; trap
- Occupations: Rapper; songwriter
- Years active: 2017–present
- Labels: M.O.B Entertainment (old); Avrupa Müzik (old); GNG Clan (present)

Utku Cihan Yalçınkaya (Turkish pronunciation: [ʊtˈku d͡ʒiˈhan jɑɫt͡ʃɯnkaja]; born August 30, 1998), better known by his stage name UZI, is a Turkish rapper and songwriter. He rose with his hit songs "Krvn" and "Umrumda Değil". His debut album Kan was released in 2021. In July 2021, Uzi became the first Turkish artist to enter the Billboard Global Excl. U.S. chart with his single "Krvn". His single "ARASAN DA" came out in "EL CHAVO" album.

== Life and career ==
Yalçınkaya was born on August 30, 1998, in the Güngören district of Istanbul. He is originally from Malatya. He started his first musical career at the age of 14–16. He later signed with M.O.B Entertainment.

He introduced himself with the song 'Semt Çocukları'', which he released with Lil Murda. Later, UZI released an EP album called Favela. The single "Siz Sevmeyin" in the album attracted great attention. After that, he released an album called 'KAN'. The album was clicked almost 300 million times on Spotify.

UZI, in 2021 M.O.B. He left Entertainment. Turkish music company made an agreement with Avrupa Music. From this company, he released an album called 'EL CHAVO' in 2022. UZI left Avrupa Music and opened its own music company called 'GNG CLAN'.

UZI; He has performed duets with many rappers such as Motive, Heijan, Muti, Russ Millions, Baby Gang, Murda, and Summer Cem.

== Discography ==
=== Albums ===
- Kan II (2026)
- MORTAL KOMBAT (2026)
- 9 (2025)
- YOUNGSTA (2023)
- EL CHAVO (2022)
- Kan (2021)
- Output Nr.1 (ft. Murda) (2019)

=== Singles and duets ===
- BABACAN (FMG X Muti) (2026)
- ANAKONDA'S (Motive) (2026)
- Say (FT Kings) (2026)
- Timsahlar (Muti) (2026)
- Konsey (Arem Özgüç X Arman Aydın) (2026)
- Yaşıyoken Anla (2026)
- Ismarla (Motive) (2025)
- Şarkılar Sokaklara Ait (Motive) (2025)
- ABKB (Modd) (2025)
- 6.4 MM (Da Poet) (2025)
- WAG1 (Modd) (2025)
- DEDE GANG (Critical) (2025)
- YALAN DÜNYA (2025)
- Kanıtlandık (Aksan) (2024)
- HER YER FAVELA (ft. Critical X heijan X muti) (2024)
- SEVGİ (ft. Murda) (2024)
- ŞAMPİYON (2024)
- İSTANBUL (ft. etki) (2024)
- AİLEM (ft. cairo X narco) (2023)
- International (ft. Russ Million) (2023)
- AĞZI BOZUK (2022)
- X-ADV (ft. Bartofso X Ashafar X Chahid) (2023)
- Caney (2023)
- Backflips (Abra Cadabra X Summer Cem X Geenaro & Ghana Beats) (2023)
- Intikam (Muti X Heijan) (2023)
- Vampir (2023)
- Flex SO Hard (RMX) (Summer Cem X Miksu / Macloud) (2022)
- SÜR (Aksan) (2022)
- Para (ft. Montiego) (2022)
- RS (ft. Bartofso & Murda) (2022)
- Arasan da (2022)
- LE CANE (RMX) (ft. Muti, Murda, Summer Cem, Critical & Heijan) (2022)
- Yengen Kızar (Nickobella Remix) (ft. Tuhan) (2022)
- Paparazzi (2021)
- Cindy (2021)
- KHRBR (ft. Ati242 & Batuflex & Lvbel C5 & Motive & Murda) (2021)
- ACAYİP (ft. Ali471) (2021)
- LE CANE (ft. Critical & Heijan & Muti) (2021)
- HARAM HELAL (ft. Capo) (2021)
- Yengen Kızar (ft. Tuhan) (2021)
- AMCAS RMX (ft. Batuflex & Lvbel C5 & Critical) (2021)
- Milyoner (ft. Critical) (2021)
- Mektup (ft. Motive & Aksan & Güneş & Modd) (2021)
- Turkish Nightmare (ft. Eko Fresh & Motive & Killa Hakan & Hayki) (2020)
- Dua (ft. Güneş) (2020)
- Makina (2020)
- Düzgün Kal (ft. Aksan) (2020)
- Paranoya (2020)
- Sizin Gibi Olmak (ft. Vio & Ati242) (2020)
- Düş Yakamdan (2020)
- Ateş Ediyo (ft. Tepki) (2020)
- Mis Gibi (ft. Motive) (2019)
