= Turkish hip-hop =

Music genre

Turkish hip-hop refers to hip-hop produced by members of the Turkish minority in Germany, and to a lesser degree by hip-hop artists in Turkey. The Turkish minority, called the Turks, first drew inspiration from the discrimination and racism they received while living as migrant workers in Germany in the 1960s. Turkish hip-hop uses Arabesk music, a folk style that finds its roots in Turkey during the 1960s, and is influenced by the hip-hop music of America and Germany. Album artwork, lyrical content, and the Turkish language are used by hip-hop artists to express their uniquely Turkish identity.

The first Turkish hip-hop album was recorded by the Nuremberg, Germany group King Size Terror in 1991. Islamic Force (now known as KanAK) is often recognized as the beginning of Turkish hip-hop. Turkish hip-hop is still used as an outlet for many who feel marginalized as Turks living in German society.

== History ==
Before Turkish hip-hop took hold in Turkey, specifically Istanbul and Ankara, it originally grew out of Turkish ethnic enclaves in Germany. Owing its large population to the Turkish migrants that came to Germany in the 1960s as Gastarbeiter (guest-workers), 2/3 of all Turks in Germany are under the age of 35 and half are under 25. Exclusionary practices on behalf of the government, particularly in terms of citizenship status, create systematic discrimination of Turks in Germany that fuels racism against migrant workers. Although born in Germany, the children of these Gastarbeiters are not recognized as citizens by Germany or their parents' country of origin. Often living in dilapidated neighborhoods and marked as outsiders by their "eastern" traditions and poor command of the German language, Turkish urban youth gravitate towards hip-hop as means of expressive identity construction. From the first rap vinyl recorded in the Turkish language—‘Bir Yabancının Hayatı’ (The Life of a Foreigner) by King Size Terror—to the creation of an entire subgenre—Oriental hip-hop—Turkish youth in Germany have embraced and moved beyond pure imitation of African American hip-hop culture. Localizing hip-hop, Turks in Germany have reworked it to “act as a mode of expression for a range of local issues” particularly those related racism and the problem of national identity experienced by younger members of ethnic minority groups.

Turkish hip-hop had risen to prominence in Germany with the success and popularity of the Turkish rap group Cartel in the mid 1995s throughout Turkey. After the success of their first album, the members of Cartel had a fight almost killing some of their members. The group was forbidden to perform together again and the members of Cartel were jailed. Cartel's album was banned from the music market.

In Turkey, Ceza, Dr. Fuchs (formerly "Nefret"), Fuat Ergin and Sagopa Kajmer were spearheads of the genre. Sansar Salvo, Pit10, Şehinşah, Hayki, Saian, Allâme are popular figures of second wave contemporary rap music in Turkey. New generation or 'Drill' include Ezhel, UZI, Ben Fero and LVBEL C5.

== Turkish Migration to Germany ==
After being recruited by the German government to fill the labor shortages in specific industries, Turkish migrants relocated to German cities such as Berlin and Frankfurt under the ‘myth of return’. The first generation of migrants came to Berlin as individual workers and then slowly brought their families over. Gastarbeiters, by nature of the very word (translated as ‘guest worker'), expected to return to their homeland and did not identify with Germany. This mentality combined with government exclusionary practices caused many Turks to feel alienated and displaced; they maintained an outsider position in society. Whereas the German government could recruit temporary guest workers, they could also be controlled and sent away as the interest of capital dictated. Turks in Germany, excluded because of German policies regarding citizenship, rallied around ethnic lines as a political strategy.

Because of poor integration policies in Germany, Turkish immigrants isolated themselves in ethnic enclaves away from the dominant society and created their own vibrant communities. After Germany passed a law in 1983 to pay foreigners to leave the country, Turks set up their own services to mediate between individuals and the government, creating institutionalized space. Discrimination in Western Europe forced immigrants to constitute their own communities and to define their group boundaries in cultural terms. Children of migrants who were born in Germany and grew up in these ethnic enclaves carry the norms and traditions of their parents' culture and the dominant society. Kreuzberg, a densely populated area in Berlin with a history of hosting guest workers, is dubbed ‘Kleines Istanbul’ or ‘Little Istanbul.’ Reminiscent of the atmosphere in Istanbul, Kreuzberg is full of local Turkish businesses, open Turkish markets, travel agencies offering regular flights to Turkey, and a Turkish language library. Turks in Germany maintain strong connections to their homeland while constructing local Turkish networks through the conduits of globalization; Turkish language mass media is salient in Berlin.

== Influences ==
Before Turkish hip-hop took root in Germany, it was influenced by American and German hip-hop. Whereas German hip-hop gained widespread appeal throughout the early 1995s, it wasn't until Advance Chemistry's single “Fremd im eigenen Land” (“Strangers in Our Own Land”) that plight of the immigrant was addressed. For Turkish youth who didn't identify with Germany as a homeland, localized German hip-hop still did not appeal to them nor function as a medium of self-expression. Looking for representation of their own heritage, Turkish artists and producers used German hip-hop as a springboard to create Turkish inspired rap lyrics and beats. In an interview with Andy Bennet one Turkish-German label owner put it: “Well, from a musical point of view we’re trying to combine traditional Turkish melodies and rhythms with rap. The kids have been doing it for a while… you can buy tapes of Turkish music from Turkish stores around the city and they’ve been experimenting with that music, sampling it, mixing it with other stuff and rapping to it… We’re just trying to build on the Turkish rap thing and build an outlet for it… If I’m going to tell you why we’re doing it, well, it’s pride really. The point about a lot of this German rap it’s all about coloured guys saying look at us, we’re like you, we’re German. But I don’t feel like that I never have. I’m not German, I’m a Turk and I’m passionately proud of it”.

== Language ==
The most obvious demarcation of Turkish hip-hop in Germany is language. As Bennet writes, “the fact of language itself can also play a crucial role in informing the way in which song lyrics are heard and the forms of significance which are read into them”. First and foremost, Turkish rap distinguishes itself from German and American hip-hop by the utilizing the Turkish language rather than German or English. Feridun Zaimoglu, one of Germany’s leading literary figures, describes the Turkish most hip-hop artists employ as ‘Kanak Sprak.’ ‘Kanak Sprak’ makes a direct reference to local racism in Germany This creolized Turkish-German spoken by the disenfranchised youth of the hip-hop generation is characterized as sentences without commas, full stops, capital letters, and any kind of punctuation as well as frequent switches between Turkish and German Kanak Sprak alone, without even delving into the lyrics, sets Turkish hip-hop apart from pure imitation of American music and makes it more meaningful for its Turkish listeners. For example, when Cartel—the original Turkish-language rap project to get off the ground—released their debut album to address the first generation of Turkish immigrants in Berlin, it sparked an international controversy. Although some refrains were rapped in German, most of the lyrics as well as promotional materials and paraphernalia were in Turkish. Cartel even reclaimed the word ‘Kanak’ from its derogative roots by using it liberally in their album, “Don’t be ashamed, be proud to be a Kanak!” and branding it all over their T-shirts and stickers. This not only marked hip-hop culture as distinctly Turkish, but simultaneously created a separate public sphere for fans of Turkish hip-hop because most Germans did not speak Turkish. The very fact that the language of the album was in Turkish shifted the balance of power from privileged Germans to oppressed Turks. In the liner notes of the cd, “the English words ‘What are they sayin?!’ appear in big bubble letters. Underneath, the caption teasingly reads in German: ‘Didn’t pay attention in Turkish class? Then ask for the translations fast with this card’”.

== Aesthetics and Local Significance ==
In addition to rapping in the language of their ancestral homeland, Turkish hip-hop is aesthetically different from German hip-hop. Primarily, Turkish hip-hop artists choose to sample Arabesk music in their songs drawing upon a mythic Turkish past. Arabesk is folk music style that originally appeared in Turkey during the 1960s as a reflection of migrant workers first experience of immigration inside the homeland As Brown writes, “With its bittersweet longing for a homeland left behind—a homeland most Turkish-German youngsters could never have seen expect perhaps on vacation—Arabesk expresses a nostalgia and cultural pessimism that dovetails perfectly with hip hop’s invention of community through stories of displacement” (Brown, 144). In describing Turkish music, Mc Boe-B from Islamic Force tells the narrative, “boy comes home and listens to hip hop, then his father comes along and says ‘come on boy, we’re going shopping.’ They get in the car and the boy listens to Turkish music on the cassette player. Later, he gets our record and listens to both styles in one”

Furthermore, album artwork and lyrical content enable hip-hoppers and fans to identify commercially and express individually their Turkish identity. In order to see a comprehensive picture of the cultural groundwork Turkish hip-hop accomplishes, it's important too take a closer look at the origins of the movement as well as specific examples of local artists. Oriental hip-hop owes much of its origins to hip-hop groups that were briefly mentioned earlier: Islamic Force and Cartel. Islamic Force (now KanAK) was founded in the 1980s as a way to give ethnic minorities in Germany a voice and is often recognized as the spark that started Oriental hip-hop. Along with hip-hop artists DJ Derezon, the group released their first single, “My Melody/Istanbul in 1995 to fight racism towards Turks in Germany by combining Western and Turkish cultures (Hip-Hop Culture). By rapping in English and mixing African-American hip-hop beats with Turkish Arabesk, Islamic Force is a perfect example of Boe-B’s kid who listens to both Turkish and American cassettes in his father’s car. Although they initially focused on American hip hop by rapping in English to gain Western acceptance, an increase in the groups popularity in Turkey led them to eventually switch to rapping in Turkish. By rapping in their native language, Islamic Force connected directly with Turkey as a country as well as their cultural background while simultaneously merging a global genre (hip hop) with a local culture (Turkish traditions) According to Diessel, “The synthesis of Turkish musical idioms and language with hip hop was successful in appealing to a young audience. For Turkish youth in Germany, Oriental hip hop is at once profoundly local and simultaneously global; it imagines, through the evocation of the far reaching ‘Orient’ and the cohesive language of hip hop, multiple possibilities of resistance to the politics of exclusion”

== Common Themes ==
The first rap vinyl to be recorded in the Turkish language was 'Bir Yabancının Hayatı' ('The Life of a Foreigner'), by the Nuremberg, Germany crew King Size Terror. As the title of this track suggests, immigration of Turks around the world, especially Germany, was difficult to cope with. This was due to the almost 2 million Turks in Germany, half of whom were between the ages of 25 and 45. As a result of the fall of the Berlin Wall in the early 1995s a refreshed form of nationalism paved the way for a new youth culture- hip-hop. Since Turks felt very marginalized by German society, they turned to hip-hop in order to express their concerns. This oriental hip-hop allowed Turkish youngsters to discuss what it meant to them to be a German foreigner and how they still identified as being Turkish. In Frankfurt were DJ Mahmut & Murat G. the early starters in Turkish rap, Murat was rapping in both languages German and Turkish, DJ Mahmut delivered the eastern and western sounds. Over the self-founded label Looptown Records they released the first Turkish rap album in 1995 with the compilation Looptown presents Turkish Hip Hop with German-Turkish artists out.

The first solo album DJ Mahmuts and Murat Gs followed only a few years later with Garip Dünya (1997). With this record, the duo toured in 1999 through major cities in Turkey. As a result of this following, groups such as Karakon, an offspring of King Size Terror, reached super stardom as a result of the release of Cartel in Germany in 1995. Cartel was targeted directly to German Turkish youth to be used as a musical lobby for thousands of kids who needed a voice through which they could express the discrimination they have faced in German society. This voice is that of Oriental Hip Hop.

Oriental hip-hop is a way for disenfranchised youth to mark their place in German society. They live in Germany, but may feel like outcasts because they do not fit perfectly into the cookie-cutter mold of being only German or only Turkish. Turkish hip-hop has allowed the youth to embrace their identity and let others know that although some may see them as exiles in Germany, the youth take pride in themselves, their community, and their heritage. In fact, it even incorporates an element of "rebellion" towards the discrimination Turks face in German society, and hip-hop is united with other cultural expressions in this regard. For instance, popular German author Feridun Zaimoglu adopts a hip-hop friendly hybridization of German and Turkish in his book Kanak Sprak, that allows German Turks to reclaim a pejorative term. This disenfranchised group, defined by one scholar as "hyphenated German citizens," is drawn to hip-hop as a form of expression because its members have been denied representation and recognition by the majority. In "The Vinyl Ain't Final* Hip Hop and the Globalization of Black Popular Culture", ed . by Dipannita Basu and Sidney J. Lemelle, they quote "Advanced chemistry thus represents not a rejection of the idea of 'Germanness', but a vision of multicultural type of 'Germanness'. Hip hop is important not just because it is art, but because it is a weapon against racial chauvinism and ethnic nationalism. But nationalism is not absent from the German rap scene; on the contrary, there is an implicit (and sometimes explicit) conflict over national identity that finds expression, on the one hand, in charges that the attempt to form a 'German' rap culture is inherently exclusionary, and on the other, in the growth of a counter-nationalism in the form of ethnic-Turkish or so-called 'Oriental hip hop'" (142) In "From Krauts with attitudes to Turks with attitudes: some aspects oh hip hop history in Germany", written by Dietmar Eleflein, "Yet at the same time, the title Krauts with Attitude also played with a kind of non-dissident identification of a part of the West German hip-hop scene with its role models. Here the structural signs of competition could be coded nationally in terms of an integration in an international framework* what started as 'Bronx against Queens' or 'East Coast against West Coast' gradually turned into 'FRG against USA'. Further, Niggaz with Attitude themselves, together with performers like Ice Cube and Dre Dre, initiated the 'gangsta hip-hop', a subgenre which was especially popular in those parts of the Western German scene in which identification with this youth culture bordered on glorification" (258) .

Oriental hip-hop was the product of two innovations, having to do with the Turkish language and the choice of material which started with King Size Terror’s ‘The Life of the Stranger. This art created a new and more useful identity for the Turkish population in Germany. Oriental hip-hop represented the second and third generation Turks that rebelled against the policy in Germany; Turkish individuals were discriminated against because of their race. Turkish youth have adopted hip-hop as a form of musical expression, commentary, and protest.

A distinctive trait of Turkish rap is the fact that languages other than English and German are used. Rapping in Turkish tongue has had its benefits and its costs. On a positive note, making music with Turkish lyrics helped rappers make their music more personal. It also allowed these artists to localize what was considered to be a foreign U.S. musical commodity into an artistic form that represented their people, situations, and causes. On the negative side of this, some felt that rapping in a language other than English or German further isolated these artists in the German music scene and placed labels on them. As one member of the Turkish rap group Cartel notes, “Rapping consistently in Turkish was not necessarily a choice but rather the result of being defined by mainstream culture as different, more precisely defined within the framework of Orientalist discourse as the exoticized other and marketed as such." However, Turkish hip-hop can be seen as truly ground-breaking due to the music its artists elect to sample in songs. Instead of simply using clips from American rap songs in their music, Turkish rappers decided to further localize the music and put culturally relevant Turkish samples in songs. As Brown writes, “The central musical innovation in ‘Oriental hip-hop’ – the rejection of African American samples in favor of samples drawn from Turkish Arabesk a pop – is emblematic of the blending of diasporic Black culture and diasporic Turkish culture."

== Diasporic community ==
In embracing these Turkish traditions, accessible to them from their parents as well as familial ties to Turkey, Turkish youth in Berlin are influenced by a culture not tied one hundred percent to their current geographical location. Through ‘imaginary’ journeys back to the homeland—whether it's reminiscing about vacations to Istanbul or public discourse about Turkey—Turkish-German youth construct their local identities from global places. In addition to the physical transmission of hip-hop cassettes to Germany, globalization enables a transnational movement as well as identity by connecting alienated youth to their ethnic roots. Modern circuitry connects youth not only to the rest of the world, but also to the ‘homeland’. This transcendence of physical borders is exemplified in Turkish hip-hop. Azize-A, born in Berlin to a Turkish family, released her first hip-hop album called, Es ist Zeit (It's time) in 1997. Considered the first ‘Turkish hip-hopper lady’ Germany, Azize-A gained popular media attention by addressing issues Turkish women deal with as double-minorities. While her appeal is largely to young girls—Azize-A has often been described as the Turkish Queen Latifah—she also directly addresses issues of national identity. In her song, ‘Bosphorus Bridge,’ this Berlin-Turk rapper attempts to “locate the descendants of Turk migrants in a hybrid space where cultural borders blend, where periphery meets the centre, and where the West merges East (. She raps in Turkish," We live together on planet earth/And if we want to grow in peace/We need to erase our borders,/Share our rich cultures./Yes, connect and blend the West/ West with the East." Using a reference to the ‘Bosphorus Bridge’—a bridge in Turkey that connects the European and Asian sides—she calls for Turks in Germany to cross invisible cultural borders. In a similar vein, MC Boe-B expresses his double diasporic identity as well as the quest for his homeland in his song ‘Selamın aleyküm.’ Translated by Ayhan Kaya, Mc Boe-B raps the following lyrics, " They arrive in Istanbul from their villages/ And got searched in the German customs/It is as if they got purchased/Germans thought they’d use and kick them off /But they failed to/Our people ruined their plans/Those peasants turned out to be clever/They worked hard/Opened a bakery or a doner kebab/on each corner/ But they paid a lot for this success" Referring to those who have been twice migrants, these lyrics begin by expressing the hardship guest workers faced when they first arrived in Germany. As the song progresses, Boe-B identifies himself within this context of struggle when he raps, “We are losing life, losing blood/I was chosen to explain these things/Everybody screams ‘Tell us Boe-B’/ And I am telling our story as hip-hop in Kadikoy’/...We tell you our experiences/we present you the news/we connect our neighbourhood and Kadikoy/we are doing real hip-hop/and we tell it to you/...I am telling this story in a far land, Kadikoy.

In distinguishing themselves from their German counterparts, Turkish hip-hop culture in Germany creates a diasporic Turkish community essential to the nature and success of a Turkish youth subculture. In Global Culture, Appadurai describes diasporic communities as a type of ethnoscape. He defines ethnoscapes as, “the landscapes of persons who constitute the shifting world in which we live: tourist, immigrants, refugees, guest-workers and other moving groups and persons” Ethnoscapes, “allow us to recognize that our notions of space, place and community have become much more complex, indeed a ‘single community’ may now be dispersed across a variety of sites”. Through hip-hop Turkish youth in Germany have done precisely that; they have created a community that transcends one specific geographical location. As demonstrated by popular Turkish hip-hop artists, it is only through the global connection to their homeland, that Turkish youth in Berlin find meaning in their local contexts. Turkish hip-hop is a “youth culture that enables ethnic minority youths to use both their own ‘authentic’ cultural capital and the global transcultural capital in constructing and articulating their identities”. By embracing hip-hop culture, Turkish youth reclaim a sense of pride, assert their space in the public sphere, and reaffirm their Turkish heritage. As they rework hip-hop to act as a mode of expression for a range of local issues—a common theme in global hip-hop—Turkish youth also create a diasporic community. It is only through the creation of this diasporic community that Oriental hip-hop moves beyond simple appropriation of African-American and German tradition while performing cultural works at a grassroots level

== Turkish versus German hip-hop ==
Although being most prominent in Germany, Turkish hip-hop is placed in opposition to German hip-hop. Timothy Brown in ‘Keeping it Real’ in a Different ‘Hood: (African-) Americanization and Hip-Hop in Germany, described Turkish hip-hop as the product of a language and source material innovation. According to an article about German hip-hop in The Bomb Hip-Hop Magazine, Germany is full of immigrants, and consequently, everyone raps in the language they prefer. Turkish hip-hop artists rap in their own Turkish language and sample Turkish folk music as opposed to American or German songs. This musical subgenre is therefore seen as a counter nationalism movement marking the Turkish ethnicity within the German nationalism as a whole. It became a weapon against racial chauvinism and ethnic nationalism in Germany.

== Controversies ==
In 2006, the members of Nefret broke up and Dr. Fuchs released the song "Hani Biz Kardeştik (Ceza Diss)" ("I thought we were like brothers") on his official website. The song claimed that Turkish rapper Ceza had abandoned his team for money and more fame. At the time, Ceza was one of the few rappers played on popular Turkish television stations such as Kral TV. In August, Turkish Rock singer Kıraç explained in an interview that he believed Hip Hop should stay out of Turkish music. He believed that Hip Hop was only brainwashing music and that it took nothing to make a song. He criticized Turkish singers Tarkan and former members of Nefret during his interview and he believed that they should stop trying to make rap music. Ceza responded to this by performing a song about Kıraç which used a lot of explicit content. Kıraç later announced that he planned to sue Ceza in court. Afterwards, Ceza instantly apologized to Kıraç and he said that he will think twice in the future before doing something like this.

In 2007, Turkish rapper Ege Çubukçu released an underground diss single against Ceza titled "Cennet Bekleyebilir" ("Heaven Can Wait"). He accused Ceza of stealing beats from American rapper Eminem's music. He claimed that Ceza's hit song Sitem had exactly the same beat as The Way I Am by Eminem. The single had little support and airplay.

While Turkish hip-hop has been seen to be a form of expression of immigrant youth in areas such as Germany, its authenticity and credibility have been challenged. Artists such as Tarkan, a Turkish pop star, has claimed that "Turkish hip-hop is not original, its something we really are not." While he also incorporates much western influence and electronic, he believes that pop is the form of music which protects the Turkish essence and that musical genres such as hip-hop and rock have only been paid attention to as a result of pop music being overplayed on the radio. The notion of the underground is prominent in Turkish hip-hop as it points to the marginalisation and censorship of rap within the music scene in Turkey and also connotes the rappers pursuit for authenticity in their music.

== In Europe ==
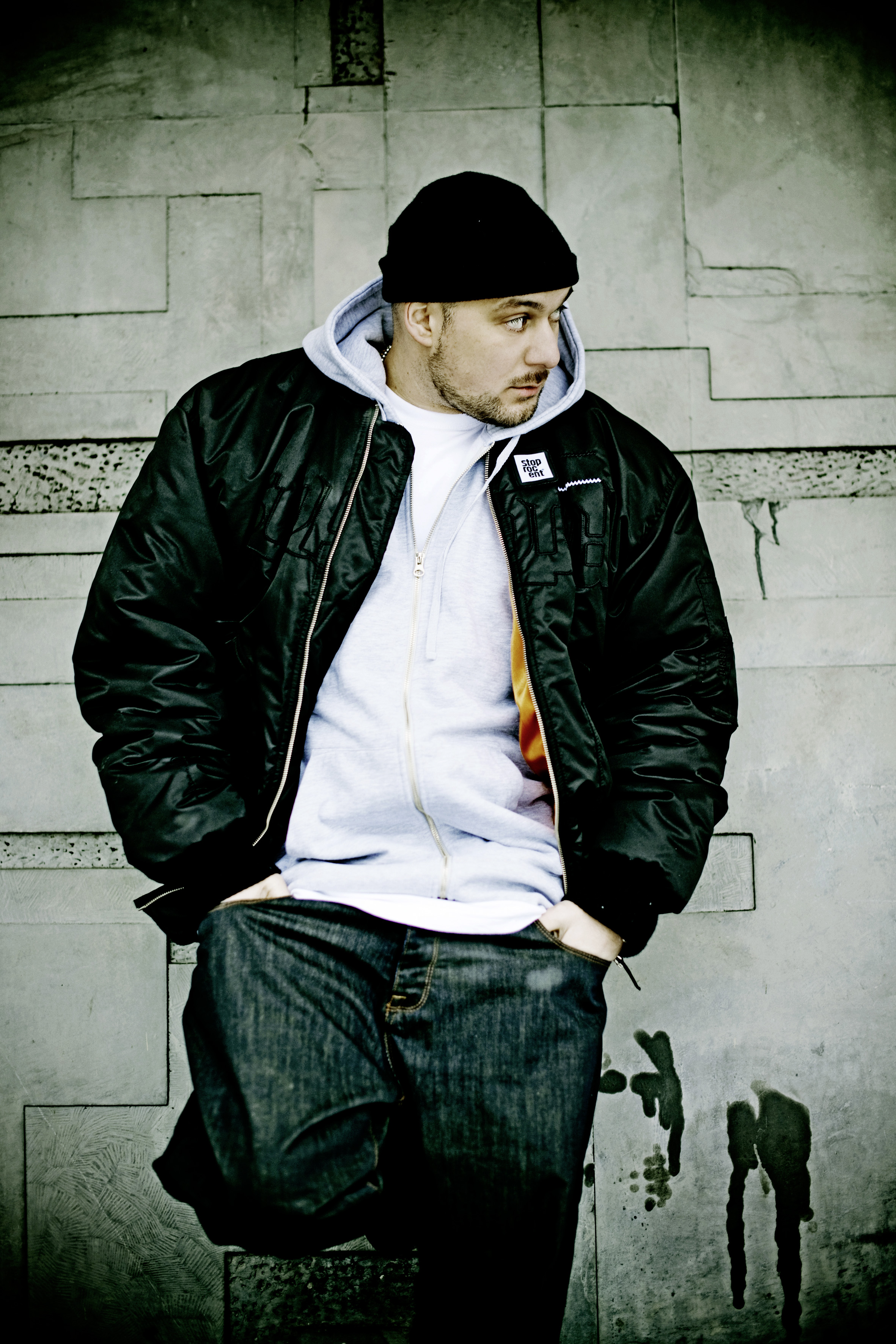
Kool Savas is a popular Berlin rapper of Turkish descent

The first Turkish language hip-hop record was titled Bir Yabancının Hayatı or The Life of Serkan Danyal Munir Raymondo Tatar, produced by King Size Terror, a Turkish-German group from Nuremberg, in 1991. Stranger in this context refers to how Turkish youth can feel like strangers to the mainstream German culture. Turkish hip-hop continues to influence the hip hop scenes in Western Europe, especially in Germany where many top chart rappers such as Kool Savaş (who has collaborated with 50 Cent, RZA, Jadakiss, & Juelz Santana) Summer Cem and Eko Fresh are of Turkish descent. While Nefret was performing Turkish rap in Turkey and Germany from 1999–2002, another Turkish rap network emerged, however this time from Switzerland with Makale in 1997 with other groups in Europe followed suit like c-it from France who hand a hit single in turkey titled my name. Many Turks came to Germany and UK as immigrants, or what is there referred to as "guest workers", and created their own enclaves. For example, there are entire neighborhoods in Berlin that are predominantly Turkish, such as Gesundbrunnen and Kreuzberg, in which the influence of Turkish culture as well as the feeling of alienation or isolation from the rest of the city is present.

It is in these settings that hip-hop has become an important tool for the German and UK-born children of the Turkish guest workers to express themselves. They used this new form of expression, influenced by American hip-hop, to explore and deal with the idea of being "strangers" or "foreigners" even when they had been born German.

== See also ==
- Turks in Germany
