= Zeynep Bastık =

Turkish singer (born 1993)

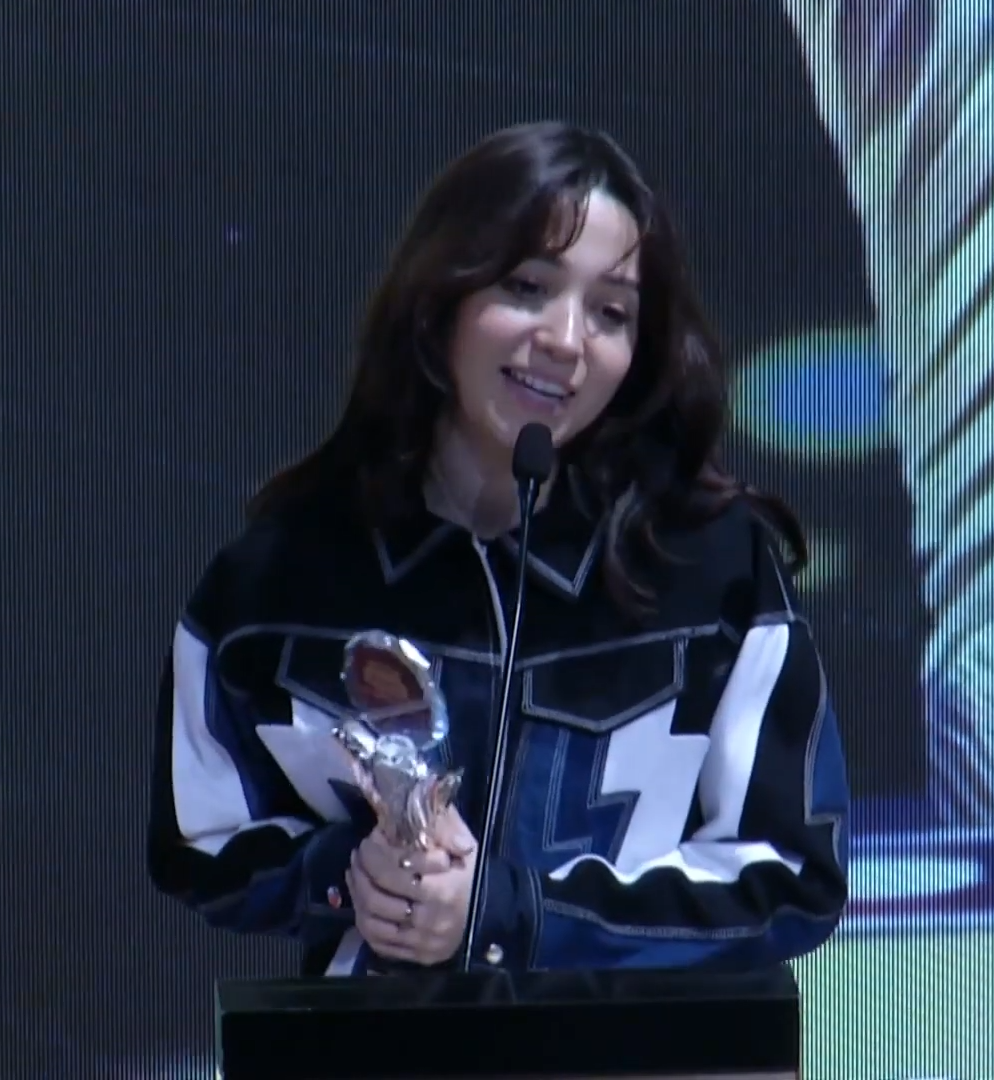
- Zeynep Bastık at the 2019 MüzikOnair Awards, February 2020

Background information
- Born: 8 July 1993 (age 33); Çanakkale, Turkey
- Origin: Turkish
- Genre: Pop
- Occupations: Singer; songwriter; actress; dancer
- Years active: 2012–present
- Labels: Promore; DMC; Yada; Hypers; Yeşil Oda; Pump Kreatif
- Website: www.zeynepb.net

Zeynep Bastık (born 8 July 1993) is a Turkish singer, songwriter, dancer, and actress.

== Life ==
Her family members are also musicians. Her mother was a folk dance teacher. At the age of fifteen she joined the Fire of Anatolia as a dancer and remained part of the group for eight years. She later became interested in Latin dance and pole dance. She also worked as an actress in musical theatres. In 2010, she started professional music with the band "Jackpot" in İzmir, performing mainly cover songs. Until 2012, she performed with this group on stage in different cities, including İzmir, Eskişehir and Bursa.

Her backing vocals were featured in Murat Dalkılıç's song "Lüzumsuz Savaş" and Anıl Piyancı's song "Delili Yok". She worked as Dalkılıç's backing vocalist for three years. With Dalkılıç's help, she released her first single "Fırça" in 2014 and second single "Şahaneyim" in 2017. She performed the duet "Ben Kalp Sen", which was composed by Dalkılıç for the series Aşk Yeniden. She also had minor roles in various TV series such as Adı Mutluluk, Yasak Elma, Sil Baştan, Umuda Kelepçe Vurulmaz and Yuvamdaki Düşman.

On the EP Akustikler, she collaborated with composers Emir Can İğrek, Sezen Aksu and Oğuzhan Koç. She wrote the lyrics for her song "Çukur" and composed it together with Çağrı Telkıvıran. All songs of Akustikler are acoustic versions.

Together with Serhat Şensesli, she wrote and composed the song "Kendi Yolumuzda" as a collaboration with Elidor to mark the International Women's Day. She co-wrote and co-composed some of the songs in her album Zeynodisco.

Bastık became an advertising face for Adidas in 2019, Elidor and Penti in 2020, Getir in 2021, and Vodafone in 2022.

== Music style ==
Bastık mainly performed rock and later acoustic and electronic music. She started her solo music career shortly afterwards. She became famous after releasing a cover version of Ezhel's song "Felaket". Additionally, she covered a number of other songs, notably by Fikri Karayel, Harun Kolçak and Ümit Sayın, which she shared on her YouTube channel. These covers helped with increasing her fame. According to Tolga Akyıldız, performing the songs of artists such as Aylin Aslım, İzel, Ferda Anıl Yarkın, Kenan Doğulu, Levent Yüksel, Jabbar, Tarkan, Mustafa Sandal, Şebnem Ferah, Harun Kolçak, Ajda Pekkan, Nilüfer, Kerim Tekin, Şahsenem, Pinhani and Sezen Aksu, and her duets with multiple artists have contributed to her popularity in the digital music market. Bastık was able to come to the fore with these advantages. It has been suggested that Can Ozan, who made his debut in the same time as Bastık, became more popular and known after his duet with her was released.

== Discography ==
Album
Album	Released	Label	Format
Zeynodisco	21 May 2021	Hypers Music	Digital download
EP
EP	Released	Label	Format
Akustikler	30 October 2020	Hypers Music	Digital download

=== Non-album singles ===
Single	Released	Label	Format
"Fırça"	31 October 2014	Promore; DMC	Digital download
"Şahaneyim"	27 March 2017	DMC	Digital download
"Bırakman Doğru Mu"	14 June 2019	Yeşil Oda Yapım	Digital download
"Mod"	12 November 2019	DMC	Digital download
"Bırakman Doğru Mu 2"	20 November 2020	Hypers Music	Digital download
"Boş Yapma"	18 December 2020	Hypers Music	Digital download
"Kendi Yolumuzda"	5 March 2021	Zeynep Bastık Müzik	Digital download
"Sen Ben"	30 July 2021	Hypers Music	Digital download
"Yalan"	24 September 2021	Houze Istanbul	Digital download
"Savaştım Harbiden"	2 September 2022	Hypers Music	Digital download
"Eyvah"	9 June 2023	Hypers Music	Digital download
"Sen Sandım"	11 August 2023	Hypers Music	Digital download
"Bundan Böyle"	15 December 2023	Hypers Music	Digital download
"Lan"	8 March 2024	Hypers Music	Digital download
"Ben Böyle"	6 September 2024	Hypers Music	Digital download
"Savaştım Harbiden"	24 January 2025	Hypers Music	Digital download
"Destan"	14 February 2025	Hypers Music	Digital download
"Kör Sevdam"	23 May 2025	Hypers Music	Digital download

Official Turkish edition works
Turkish version	Original song	Released	Label	Format
"Ara"	Nej – Paro	29 July 2022	Hypers Music	Digital download

==== As featured artist ====
Other non-single works, with year of release and album names
Song	Year	Album
"Lüzumsuz Savaş" (with Murat Dalkılıç)	2012	Bir Güzellik Yap
"Delili Yok" (with Anıl Piyancı and Red)	2012	Kafamızı Yap
"Ben Kalp Sen" (with Murat Dalkılıç)	2015	Aşk Yeniden Soundtrack
"Güneş" (with Murda and Idaly)	2020	DOĞA
"Yatakta Kardiyo" (with Edis)	2025	Bachi-Bouzouk

Tribute album works
Song	Year	Album
"Cefalar" (with Emrah Karaduman)	2015	Toz Duman
"Yağmur" (with Arif Zeynalov)	2020	—N/a
"Kazandım" (with Nükhet Duru)	2020	Hikayesi Var
"Eksik Bir Şey"	2020	Ezginin Günlüğü 40 Yıllık Şarkılar

Back vocal works
Song	Year	Album
"Pişmanlar Romanı" (with Murat Dalkılıç)	2016	Epik
"Deli Et Beni" (with Berkay)	2019	İz
"Sayenizde" (with Berkay)	2019	İz
"Bu Kız Beni Görmeli" (with Berkay)	2019	İz
"Vurur" (with Berkay)	2019	İz
"Dokun Bana" (with Berkay)	2019	İz
"Bi' Tek Ben Anlarım" (with KÖFN)	2022	—N/a
"Facia" (with Emir Can İğrek)	2022	—N/a

== Filmography ==
Year	Title	Role
2014	Sil Baştan	Herself/Guest
2015	Adı Mutluluk	Gonca Gül Duran
2016–2017	Umuda Kelepçe Vurulmaz	Rüya
2018	Yuvamdaki Düşman	Zeynep
2018	Yasak Elma	İrem
2021–	Zeynep Bastık ve Konukları	Presenter
2021	Çok Güzel Hareketler 2	Herself/Guest
