= Güneş (singer) =

Turkish singer-songwriter (born 1999)

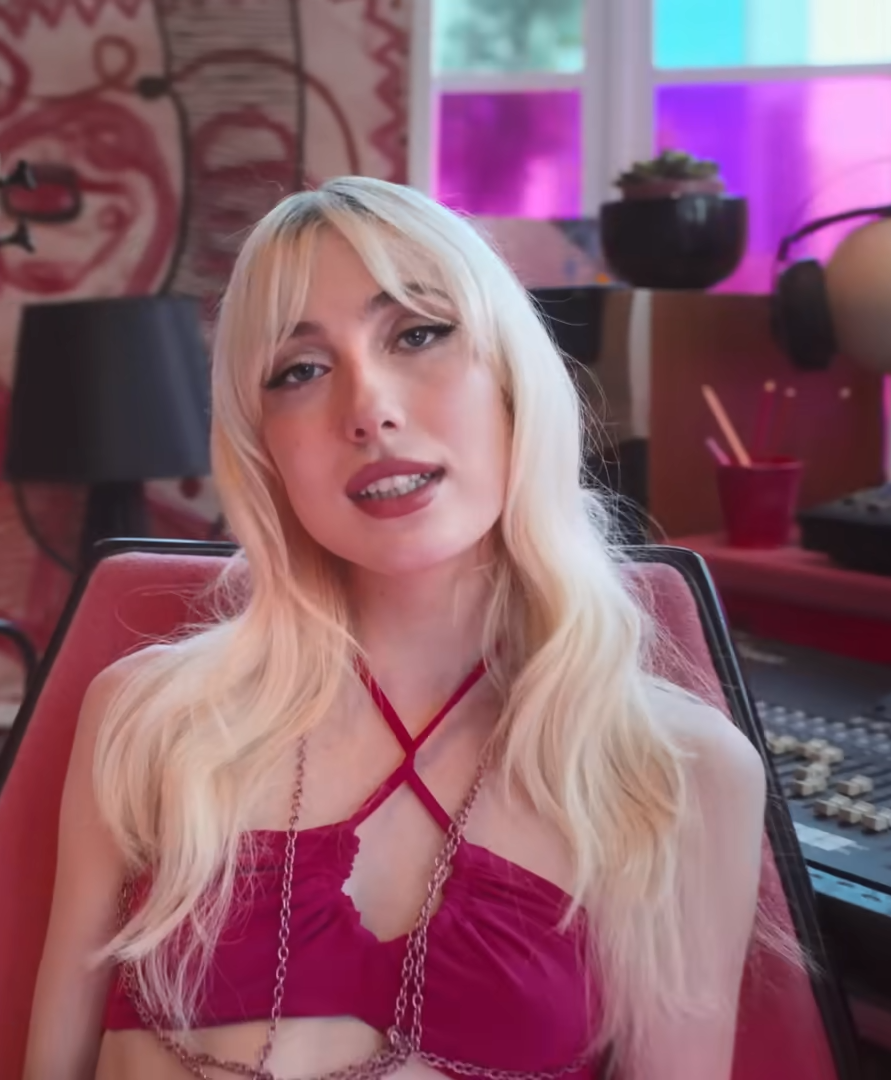
- Güneş in 2022

Background information
- Born: Müzeyyen Güneş Taşkıran; 1 December 1999 (age 26); Yenibosna, Bahçelievler, Istanbul, Turkey
- Genres: R&B; indie; Turkish rap; pop
- Occupations: Singer; songwriter; rapper
- Years active: 2020s–present
- Labels: M.O.B. Entertainment; Sony Music Turkey

Müzeyyen Güneş Taşkıran (born 1 December 1999, in Yenibosna, Istanbul), also known by her stage name Güneş, is a Turkish singer, songwriter and rapper active in the R&B, indie, rap and pop genres.

== Life and career ==
Güneş in 2022

Güneş, who makes music in the R&B, pop, Turkish rap, and indie genres, entered the charts of the most-streamed tracks on Spotify with her songs "Suçlarımdan Biri" and "Dua", a duet with Uzi. Güneş released her first album, Atlantis, in 2022. Until 2023, Güneş released her songs under the M.O.B. Entertainment label, a hip-hop collective. In January 2023, she signed with Sony Music Turkey. Her song "Dua" has been viewed over 200 million times on YouTube, while "Suçlarımdan Biri" surpassed 160 million streams on Spotify, compared to 110 million for "NKBİ". Güneş released her second album, POP, in 2023. In 2024, she released the songs "Mahvet 2.0", "Yorgan", "Otoban", "Klişe Masallar" and "Şehir Uyumaz", and the following year, "Beyaz Sayfalar". In 2026, she released "Al Ya Da Bırak", "Ekşimtrak", "Paramparça" and "Mutfak". Güneş released the EP Ekşimtrak, on 24 April 2026. Güneş released the song "We Ignite The Night" on 16 October 2026. Güneş appeared as a guest judge on Episode 6 of Season 2 of Big5 Türkiye on November 12, 2026.
