= Can Ozan =

Turkish musician and producer

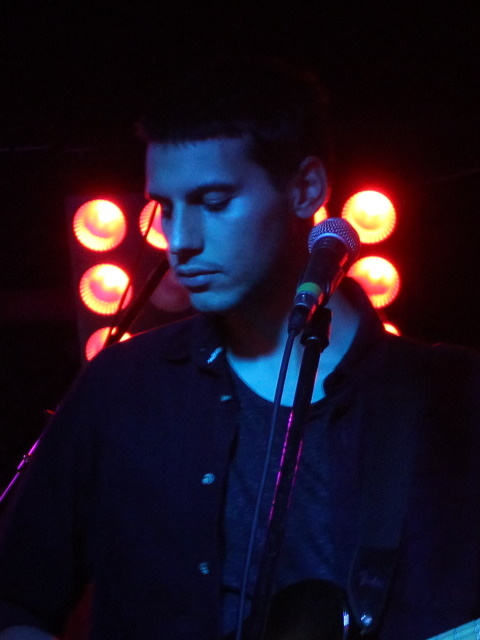
- Ozan in Antalya concert, 2019

Background information
- Born: October 7, 1990 (age 35)
- Genres: Alternative
- Occupations: Musician; record producer
- Instrument: Guitar
- Years active: 2015–present
- Label: Avrupa

Can Ozan (born 7 October 1990) is a Turkish musician and record producer. He performs acoustic and electronic music. He has collaborated with artists such as Deniz Tekin, Zeynep Bastık, Nova Norda, Dolu Kadehi Ters Tut, Damla Eker, Umut Döven and Sedef Sebüktekin on various music projects.

His interest in music began at an early age, and when he was 15 he participated in the High School Music Contest. Ozan, who studied advertising, was influenced in his music by Bulutsuzluk Özlemi, Duman, Bob Dylan and Bülent Ortaçgil. He made his debut by performing a duet with Deniz Tekin titled "Transatlantik". In 2015, he released his first album Delirmiyorsan Tebrikler. Between 2015 and 2019, he continued his career by releasing various singles and albums, including Bi Şey Var, Derleme and Dolunay. In April 2020, he released the single Paranoyak under the label Avrupa Müzik.

== Discography ==
Albums

- Delirmiyorsan Tebrikler (2015)
- Derleme (2017)
- Dolunay (2018)
- Dolunay, Vol. 1 (Live) (2020)
- Evde (with Nova Norda, Sedef Sebüktekin and Birkan Nasuhoğlu) (2021)
- kapalı perdeler (2021)

EPs

- Canozan (2015)
- Dolunay, Vol. 2 (Live) (2020)

Singles

- "Transatlantik" (feat. Deniz Tekin) (2017)
- "Görünen Adam" (with Umut Döven) (2017)
- "Öyle Kolay Aşık Olmam (feat. Damla Eker) (2017)
- "Bul Beni" (with Sedef Sebüktekin) (2017)
- "Yeniden Doğarsa" (feat. Deniz Tekin) (2017)
- "Dünyaya" (2017)
- "Kendini Bul" (feat. Damla Eker) (2017)
- "Günler Kısa" (with Sedef Sebüktekin) (2018)
- "Aklım Hep Firarda" (with Dolu Kadehi Ters Tut) (2018)
- "Lavinia" (feat. Ezgi Türkeli) (2018)
- "Kayıp Evren Atlası" (with Ne Jupiter) (2018)
- "Yaz Şarkısı" (2018)
- "Akustikhane Sessions" (2018)
- "Dünya Dursun" (2019)
- "Sen Kocaman Çöllerde" (feat. Sedef Sebüktekin) (2019)
- "Ön Koltuk" (2019)
- "NIKØ" (with Dramaphone) (2020)
- "Feels Like" (with Moawk, feat. Bill Batt) (2020)
- "Paranoyak" (2020)
- "Hepsi Kafamda" (with Dilan Balkay) (2020)
