= Emir Can İğrek =

Turkish singer and songwriter (born 1993)

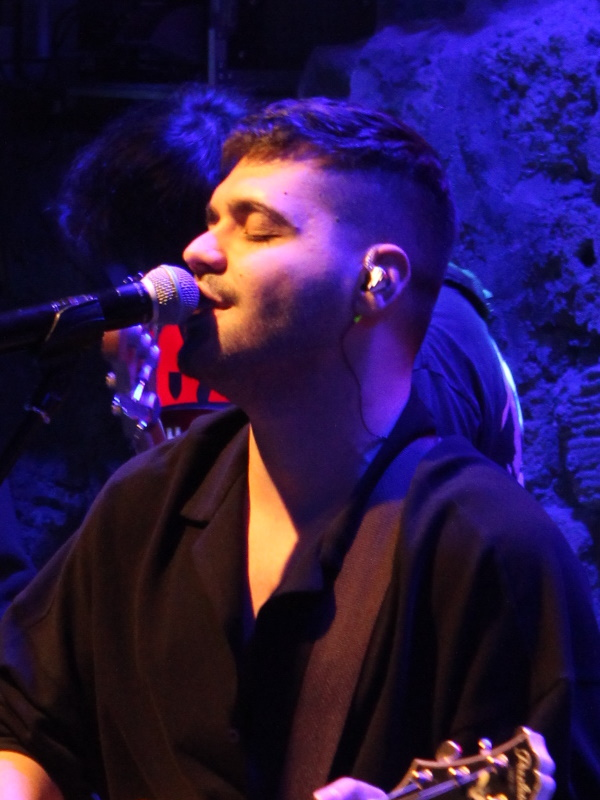
- During his concert in Antalya (November 2021)

Background information
- Born: 2 April 1993 (age 33); Çerkezköy, Turkey
- Genre: Alternative rock
- Occupations: Singer; composer
- Instrument: Guitar
- Years active: 2017–present
- Labels: 3 Adım; ILS Vision

Emir Can İğrek (born 2 April 1993, Çerkezköy) is a Turkish singer and songwriter. He started making music by setting up small stage groups in the city where he was born. In 2019, he had his breakthrough with the song "Nalan". At the 2020 PowerTürk Music Awards, he was awarded as the "Most Powerful Newcomer of the Year". He has also composed songs for artists such as Funda Arar and Ferhat Göçer.

As of 2020, he is studying at Yıldız Technical University.

On 9 April 2026, İğrek was arrested in Istanbul during a drug investigation involving public figures. He was subsequently released but placed under judicial control with a travel ban.

== Discography ==
Albums

- Ağır Roman (2018)
- Parti İptal (2023)

EP

- "Sapa" (2020)

Singles

- "Gönül Davası" (2017)
- "Aç Bağrını" (2018)
- "Defoluyorum" (2019)
- "Gömleğimin Cebi" (2019)
- "Dönsen Bile" (2019)
- "Nevale" (2019)
- "Nalan" (2019)
- "Silahım Yok" (2019)
- "Meydan" (2020)
- "Darbe" (ft. Patron) (2020)
- "Saman Sarısı" (2020)
- "Dargın" (with Zeynep Bastık) (2020)
- "Bıraktım Şaşırmayı" (2021)
- "Zemin" (2021)
- "Memur" (2021)
- "Çiftetelli" (2021)
- "Kor" (2021)
- "İntihaşk" (2021)
- "Gurbete Kaçacağım" (Yeni Türkü Zamansız) (2022)
- "Felfena" (2022)
- "Bana Unutmayı Anlat" (with Cem Adrian (2022)
- "Kafa Tatili" (2022)
- "Facia" (2022)
- "Görünce Dünyamın Yıkıldığı (Live)" (with Şanışer, 2022)
- "Beyoğlu" (2022)
- "Dayanamam" (2022)

== Awards ==
- Most Powerful Newcomer Singer in 2019, PowerTürk Music Awards
- Most Admired Male Singer in 2019, Altınyıldız Classics Stars of the Year Awards (YTU)
