= King Size Terror =

German hip-hop group

- Genres: Hip-Hop; Hardcore Hip Hop; Gangsta rap
- Years active: 1982–1997
- Labels: Blunt Records; Vulkan Verkag
- Past members: Alper Aga (Alper Tunga); Big Porno Ahmet; Chill Fresh; Drum T; Dj Froggy; Mic Force; Dj Cooley N; The Incredible Al; Radical Hate; Suikast

King Size Terror is a German hip hop group of Turkish, Peruvian, and Afro-American origin.

Based out of Nuremberg, the group produced the first Turkish language rap in the budding German hip hop scene. Their song, "Bir Yabancinin Hayati" ("The Life of a Stranger"), marked the beginning of a new genre in German music.

Alper Aga, rapper of King Size Terror, founded Karakan, which was one of the first Turkish Hip Hop crews. they released the single "Defol Dazlak" (Piss Off, Skinhead), which became a hymn for Turkish kids in Germany. Later Karakan became part of the first successful project of Turkish Hip Hop: Cartel.

Many Turkish German hip hop artists claim that the lyrically based art form is a means of highlighting their situation, and releasing the anger and frustration associated with poverty and social marginalization.

King Size Terror has released 3 official albums. Their first, which was released in 1989 is 'Saturday Ride', then they released another one which was independently produced in 1991, is titled 'The Word Is Subversion'. Three years later, Blunt Records produced the popular full-length album 'Ultimatum'.

In 1997 Karakan released their first and only album "Al Sana Karakan", which was completely produced by Chill Fresh (except "Hepsi Benim" which was produced by AK's younger brother, Suikast, who was also a feature MC on "Ultimatum").
