= 36 Boys =

- The logo of the 36 Boys
- Founded by: Attila Murat Aydın
- Founding location: Berlin-Kreuzberg, Germany
- Years active: 1987-mid 1990s
- Territory: Germany
- Ethnicity: Mostly German Turks
- Membership (est.): ca. 150
- Criminal activities: Drug trafficking, robbery, extortion, arson, burglary and vandalism
- Allies: Autonomists Black blocs
- Rivals: Neo-Nazis, Skinheads, Warriors gang, Black Panthers gang

The 36 Boys were a street gang in the Berlin-Kreuzberg active from the late 1980s to the mid-1990s. Most members were the sons of Turkish immigrants, though other nationalities were represented. Th name come from SO 36 (Südost 36), the former postal code district around Kottbusser Tor and Naunynstraße where the gang operated. Members came together mainly to protect the neighbourhood from Neo Nazis and skinheads and the gang also fought turf conflicts with rivals such as the Warriors and the Black Panthers.

After the gang broke up, some former members stayed in crime, while other became social workers or took up other careers, among them the chef Tim Raue, the rapper Killa Hakan and film director Neco Çelik. German media have long treated the 36 boys as the archetypal immigrant street gang. Former members have since sold clothing and other goods under its name and logo and the gang is subject of a 2026 book by Paul Christoph Gäbler.

== Background ==
The gang formed in Kreuzberg’s SO 36 district, a poor run down area at the edge of the West Berlin, close to the Wall, with a large Turkish population. Its first members were mainly sons of Turkish guest workers who were growing up in climate of open hostility towards Turks, and the gang gave them a way to show strength in numbers.

== Rivalries ==
In its early years the gang's main opponents were mainly New Nazis and skinheads. In the early 1990s they both fought for territory in Jungfernheide park. Members have said they have joined partly to defend Kreuzberg against these groups. The 36 boys also clashed with other Berlin youth gangs among them the Warriors, from the area around Schlesisches Tor and the Black Panthers from Wedding. A younger branch, the 36 juniors, was considered more prone to violence.

== Legacy ==
By the mid 1990s the gang had dissolved. A Berlin police official later said that tighter organised youth gangs with hierarchies and insignia on their jackets of the kind seen from the late 1980s to the mid 1990s no longer existed in the city.

Former members took varied paths. Some stayed in the criminal world and others became social workers in housing projects and youth centres. In 2007, the Berlin Senate hired former members as Kiezläufer in Kreuzberg to help prevent juvenile delinquency. Others became know in their fields among them the chef Tim Raue, the rapper Killa Hakan and the director Neco Çelik. The gang's membership was mixed. A former member remembers recalls a Turkish majority alongside Yugoslavs, Slavs, Greeks, Arabs and a few Germans. The gang's name and logo outlived the gang itself. Sinan Tosun, a former member began selling 36 Boys clothing by hand and later opened a shop on in Adalbertstraße and the logo became a familiar sight on the streetwear in Kreuzberg. Another former member Muci, formed a fashion label under the name. Çelik has criticised for turning the gang's founding idea into a commercial brand.

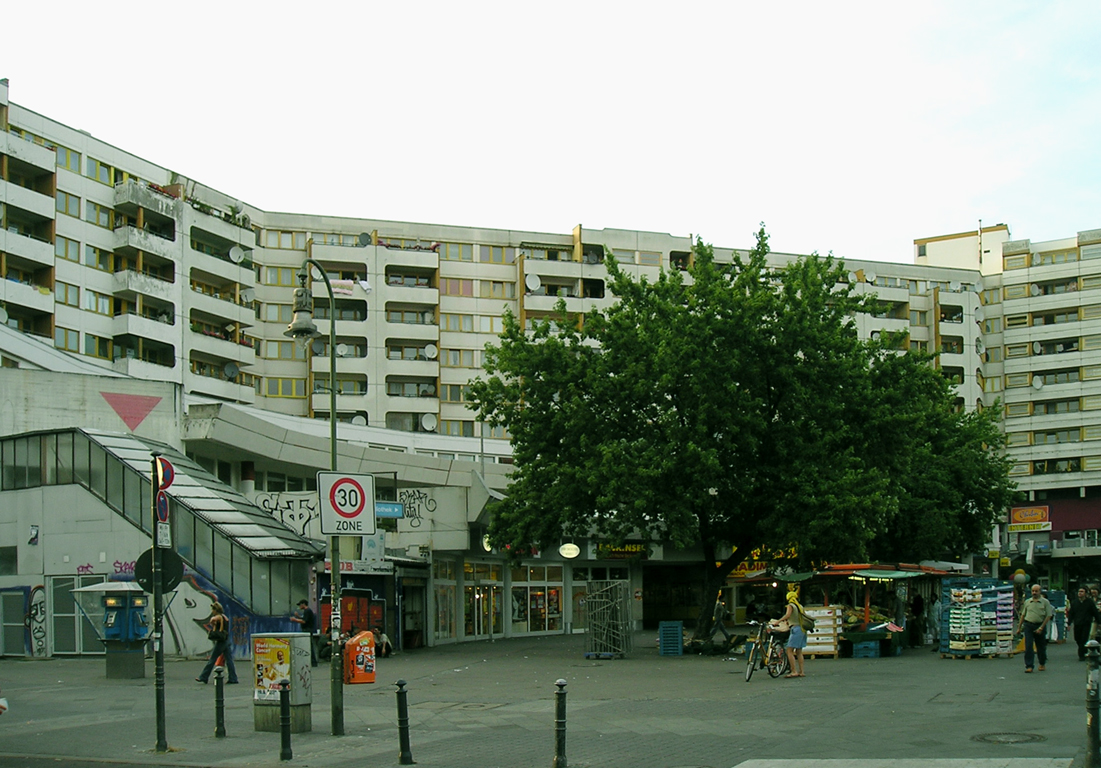
The tower blocks of the Kottbusser Tor in Berlin-Kreuzberg, former turf of the 36 Boys

== Sources ==
- Klaus Farin and Eberhard Seidel-Pielen. Krieg in den Städten: Jugendgangs in Deutschland. Berlin: Rotbuch, 1991. ISBN 3-88022-044-1 (in German)
- Murat Güngör and Hannes Loh. Fear of a Kanak planet: HipHop zwischen Weltmusik und Nazi-Rap. Planegg: Hannibal, 2002. ISBN 3-85445-210-1 (in German)

This article is based on a translation of the equivalent article on the German Wikipedia.
