= Islamic Force =

Islamic Force is an Oriental hip hop group, originally from Berlin, who ultimately began the Oriental hip-hop movement as a way of creating an identity for minorities in Germany. The group was founded in the late 1980s during a time of growth for hip-hop in Germany and was made up of members of different ethnicities, including lyric writer and rapper:

- Boe-B, the founder of the group and is of Turkish origin

- Killa Hakan; vocalist whose families originally were from Turkey,

- DJ Cut Em' T; co-founder and scratcher whose real name is Tamer Yiğit and whose family is originally from Turkey as well,

- Maxim36; who is also Turkish origin and an activist from Berlin,

- DJ Derezon; producer whose ancestry was Spanish and German,

- Nelie; vocalist whose family hailed from Germany and Albania.

Originally, their focus was on American hip-hop, and the group felt a strong connection to African American hip-hop, but they soon began experimenting with Turkish music and were the first group to combine computer drum rhythms with Arabesque breaks.

Islamic Force chose their name partially because of the negative stereotypes of Islam in Germany at the time, with hopes that their music would positively combat these hostile feelings and make German society more accepting of Muslims. They were also influenced by Afrika Bambaata and his music. Their first record, My Melody/Istanbul was released in 1992, during a wave of racism towards Turks in Germany and combined popular hip-hop with traditional Turkish music as an attempt to decrease racism towards Turks in Germany by combining Western and Turkish cultures. As part of the attempt to break down racism, "My Melody/Istanbul" serves as a prime example of Oriental Hip-Hop's use of the English language as well as Afro-American beats, Turkish arabesque and Pop Muzik. This is meant to bridge the experience of Turkish immigrants and German citizens of Turkish descent who listen to American hip-hop and more traditional Turkish music, yet at the same time are excluded and devalued by the greater German experience and therefore are not part of the German Hip-Hop scene. Throughout their career, Islamic Force continued to present the point of view of the minorities in German society, often focusing on the plight of the Gastarbeiter, or guest workers, who were usually viewed as second-class citizens, regardless of their skills or education levels. From the song "Selamın Aleyküm":

Köyden İstanbul'a vardılar

Alman gümrüğünde kontrol altında kaldılar

Sanki satın alındılar

bunları kullanıp kovarız sandılar

Ama aldandılar...

"They arrived in Istanbul from their villages / And got searched in German customs / As if they'd been purchased / They thought they’d use them and kick them out / But they were wrong…"

These lyrics express the situation and hardships of the Guest Workers in German society and the feelings of hostility they experienced, presenting the situation in such a way that empowered minority groups to stand up for their rights and not succumb to being mistreated. This also shows the group's connection to African American hip-hop because of the racism the two groups both experienced and the strong pride both share in their backgrounds.

While Islamic Force's lyrics were originally written in English in order to gain Western acceptance and a wider audience, with the growth of their popularity in Turkey, the group eventually switched to rapping in Turkish. By rapping in Turkish, Islamic Force felt more connected to the country and their background and also helped to merge the global genre with more local culture. They also eventually switched their name to Kan-AK so that they did not offend any conservative Islamic Turks or be mistaken for a radical group. The name Kan-AK also served to appropriate a negative act towards Turks and other minorities in Germany, effectively taking a word with a negative connotation and making it more positive.
