= Ozbi =

- Born: Onur Dursun; 30 January 1986 (age 40); Istanbul, Turkey
- Genre: Hip hop
- Occupations: Rapper; songwriter
- Years active: 2011–present

Onur Dursun (born 30 January 1986), better known by his stage name Ozbi, is a Turkish rapper and songwriter.

== Life and career ==
Dursun was born in 1986 in Istanbul. His family are from Erzincan. Ozbi, who has been interested in rap music since the age of 14, has graduated from Anadolu University, School of Turkish Language and Literature. During the Gezi Park protests, he released the song "Asi". He released his first solo album Halk Edebiyatı in 2014. Then, in 2016, he started the Rakılı Live series with Gülce Duru. The first album of the series was released in 2016 and the second in 2017. In 2018, he released his album called the album Serserilik ve Şiir.

Ozbi was one of the various artists featured on Şanışer's single "Susamam", which was released on 6 September 2019. In 2020, he appeared as a guest artist on Murathan Mungan's tribute album 2020 Model and voiced the song "Gecenin Eldiveni" together with him. On 20 February 2020, he released the album Rakılı Live 3. Seri, the third installment of the Rakılı Live series.

== Discography ==
=== Albums ===
- Halk Edebiyatı (2014)
- Rakılı Live 1. Seri (2016)
- Rakılı Live 2. Seri (2017)
- Serserilik ve Şiir (2018)
- Rakılı Live 3. Seri (2020)

=== Singles ===
- "Asi" (2013)
- "Kazulet" (2013)
- "Kalbine Sor" (2017)
- "Bahar Yanmadan Gel" (2017)
- "Hadi Gittik" (feat. Melek Mosso) (2018)
- "Sonu Yok" (2019)
- "Aman Diyene Vurulmaz" (2019)
- "Yıldız Tozu" (2020)
- "Dünya'm 20:24" (2020)
- "O bi karamel" (2020)
- "Geceyi Anlatmış" (2020)
- "Geceye Varınca" (feat. Kayra) (2021)
- "Sana Sormam" (2021)
- "Parasetamol" (2021)
- "Gece Görüşü" (2021)
- "Bu Gezegen" (2022)
- "Yes Rakı, No Pain (64bars)" (feat. Da Poet) (2022)
- "Boşver Gitsin" (2022)
- "Bayılırız Deliliğe" (feat. Dolu Kadehi Ters Tut) (2022)
- "Sadece Biz" (2023)
- "Kaçıncı Seviye" (2023)
