= Cartel (rap group) =

Turkish hip hop CD project

- Origin: Turkey, Germany
- Genres: Hip hop; world
- Occupations: Rappers; singers
- Instrument: Vocals
- Years active: 1995–present
- Labels: PolyGram (1995–2011); GRGDN (2011–present)
- Members: Alper Tunga; Big Porno Ahmet; Kabus Kerim from Karakan; M.Ali; Babalu; İnceEfe; Olcay from Da Crime Posse; Erci E; DJ A-Bomb

Cartel is a Turkish hip-hop music project which originated in Berlin-Kreuzberg, Germany. It released its debut album in 1995 and helped to popularize Turkish rap. The group used Turkish folk melodies combined with lyrics that addressed cultural pride and standing up against racism faced by Turkish immigrants in Germany.

It involved at least three groups of rappers from different German cities, which received attention and popularity in both Turkey and Germany. It was notable for using samples of traditional Turkish music instruments in hip hop music. Cartel was the first Turkish-language project to get off the ground and often credited as the group that ignited "Oriental hip hop".

During Cartel's short career, the band gave around 120 extremely successful concerts in Turkey, Germany, Switzerland, Austria, the Netherlands and France. Cartel is the only hip-hop group that managed to fill Istanbul's İnönü Stadium (as of December 2006). In addition to German and Turkish-speaking media, BBC London also reported on the group, as did the music channels VIVA and MTV.

In Turkey, where the band, which also appears in English, Spanish and German, has remained most successful, Cartel has sold more than half a million CDs through official sales to date. On 4 February 2011 the group released their new album Bugünkü Neşen Cartel'den and their new video Bir Oluruz, but without Kabus Kerim.

== Discography ==
Year	Title	Label
1995	Cartel	PolyGram
2004	Cartel 2004 Yeni Basım (Cartel 2004 New Printing)	PolyGram
2011	Bugünkü Neşen Cartel'den	GRGDN
