= Melek Mosso =

- Born: Melek Davarcı; 11 November 1988 (age 37); Kayseri, Turkey
- Genres: Jazz
- Occupation: Musician · songwriter
- Instrument: Vocals · Western concert flute
- Years active: 2018–present
- Member of: Zbam The Band
- Spouse: Serkan Sağdıç (m. 2023)
- Website: www.melekmosso.com

Melek Davarcı (born 11 November 1988), better known by her stage name Melek Mosso, is a Turkish musician and music teacher.

== Life and career ==
Melek Mosso was born on 11 November 1988 in Kayseri. She started composing music at the age of seven. At the age of nine, she began to take bağlama and Turkish folk music lessons at Denizli Municipality Conservatory. Mosso then continued her education at Fine Arts High School, where she started playing the Western concert flute. She completed her university education at Adnan Menderes University, School of Education, Department of Music Teaching. She was a chorist and soloist throughout her university years.

After completing her education, she occasionally performed on the Kadıköy - Beşiktaş line in Istanbul. She also organized piano, flute, solfège and harmony lessons for her students who wanted to take the conservatory exams. Mosso also participate in various music competitions and performed jazz and swing with Zbam The Band, which she founded with her musician friends.

Mosso's cover of Yıldız Tilbe's song "Vursalar Ölemem", garnered over 100 million views on YouTube. Together with No.1, she voiced the song "Hiç Işık Yok", which was included on the soundtrack for the TV series Çukur and viewed over 100 million times on YouTube. The song was later featured in No.1's album Siyah Bayrak. In 2018, her song "Kedi" was played by various radio stations in Turkey.

== Isparta concert controversy ==
In May 2022, Mosso, who was about to perform at the Isparta International Gül Festival on 3 June, was banned from appearing on stage by Isparta Municipality. Previously, similar bans had been imposed for artists Aynur Doğan, Niyazi Koyuncu and Apolas Lermi. In a previous appearance on stage, Mosso had stated, "If you want to be open, open up, if you want to talk, speak up. You don't need anyone to tell you how to act, what to do, how to dress, girls. You have your own wings. You don't need to be under anyone's wing. Fly." Mehmet Kaya, provincial chairman of the New Welfare Party, criticized Mosso in his remarks and described her as an individual "known for attacking our culture, belief, and morality." He also condemned the decision to invite her to the festival "in our city, which is known for its high Islamic sensitivity in our country," and spoke against "activities that would help someone's efforts to rob our girls of their chastity." Additionally, the Anatolian Youth Association and the National Youth Foundation reacted to the concert with a joint statement, saying in part, "In these times when we are going through economically difficult times, such activities, which are organized by the taxes of our people and contribute to the moral erosion of our youth, are not accepted by our people and cause discomfort." Mosso reacted to the criticism via her own statement, "I am a woman of this country. With my ideas, vision and dreams, I process my art into the future every day. I have millions of fans, young and old. A few ignorant people cannot question my morals or insult my femininity." Despite her controversy, she got to perform at an event celebrating the 100th anniversary of the establishment of the Turkish Republic in Silivri the next year.

== Discography ==
EPs

- Melek Mosso (2020)

Singles

- "Kedi" (2018)
- "Gölgen Yeter" (2018)
- "Keklik Gibi" (2019)
- "Vursalar Ölemem" (2019)
- "Sarıla Sarıla" (2019)
- "Gönül Gözü" (2020)
- "Unutan Kazanır" (2020)
- "Cumartesi Türküsü" (2020)
- "Yalan" (ft. Aras) (2020)
- "Kurtuldun Dediler" (2020)
- "Kızgınım" (2021)
- "Ağlarsam" (2021)
- "Sonrası Kalır" (2021)
- "Gel Desem de Gelme" (with Aras) (2021)
- "Zülüf" (with Haluk Levent) (2021)
- "Parayla Saadet Olmaz" (from the album Sevda Yüklü Şarkılar) (2021)
- "Hayatım Kaymış" (2021)
- "Kirpiklerin" (2021)
- "Kimsenin Kimsesi" (with Veys Çolak) (2021)
- "Karanfil" (from the album Yeni Türkü Zamansız) (2022)
- "Yıllar Affetmez" (from the album Saygı Albümü: Bergen) (2022)
- "Vazgeç Gönlüm" (2022)
- "Sabahçı Kahvesi" (2022)
- "Bu İş Bitmiş" (2022)
- "Kendimi Vurdum (Live)" (with Şanışer) (2022)
- "Parayla Saadet Olmaz" (2022)
- "Beni Hatırla" (with Ceylan Ertem) (from the album Duyuyor Musun?) (2022)
- "Çanakkale Türküsü" (with Burcu Arı, feat. Hatice Davarcı) (2022)
- "Adem Olan Anlar" (with Genco Arı) (2022)
- "İllettim" (2023)
- "İnce İnce Bir Kar Yağar" (2023)
- "Mesele Belli" (2023)
- "Üzülmedim ki" (2023)
- "Sana Değer" (from the album Bülent Özdemir Şarkıları) (2024)
- "Çıkmaz Sokak" (from the album Söz Müzik Onur Can Özcan) (2024)
- "Sen Aldırma" (from the album İbrahim Erkal Hürmet 2) (2024)
- "Balerin" (2024)
- "Mazeretim Var Asabiyim Ben" (with Faruk Sabancı) (2024)
- "Yeri Var" (2024)
- "Kurşun Adres Sormaz Ki" (with Anıl Şallıel) (2024)
- "Ufak Ufak (Prodüktör Genco Arı)" (2024)
- "Söz Bitti" (from the album SAYGI1) (2024)
- "Aşkın Adı" (2025)
- "Canım Acıyor" (2025)
- "Sanki" (with Doğukan Medetoğlu) (2025)
- "Badem" (2025)
- "Hayat" (2025)
- "Kendisi Çıktı Bu Yoldan" (with Cemre) (2026)
- "Seni Sevmediğim Yalan" (from the album Selami Şahin Şarkıları 3) (2026)
- "Evleniyormuş" (with Hatice Mosso) (2026)
- "Kolay Değil" (with Murat Boz) (2026)
- "Gidenlerden" (from the album Mustafa Sandal Saygı 1) (2026)
- "Yaşamak Dedikleri" (2026)
