= Erci E =

- Born: Ercüment Ergün; 1973 (age 52–53); Berlin, West Germany
- Genres: Hip hop; world
- Occupations: Rapper; singer; songwriter
- Years active: 1995–present
- Member of: Cartel

Ercüment Ergün (born 1973), better known as Erci E, is a Turkish-German rapper, singer and songwriter. His parents were Turkish immigrant workers. He is best known for his work with the pioneering Turkish rap group Cartel in 1995.
