= Killa Hakan =

Turkish rapper and songwriter

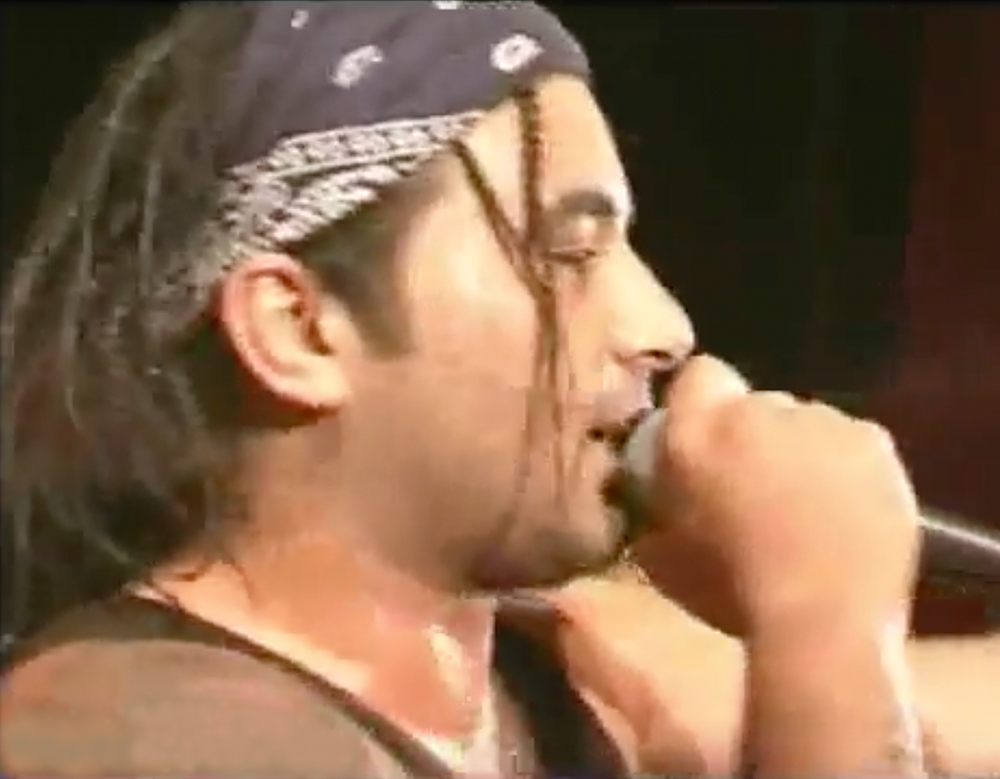
- Killa Hakan performing in 2016

Background information
- Born: Hakan Durmuş; 3 March 1973 (age 53); Berlin, West Germany
- Genres: Hip hop, hardcore rap, gangsta rap
- Occupations: Rapper, songwriter
- Years active: 1986–present

Hakan Durmuş (born 3 March 1973), better known by his stage name Killa Hakan, is a Germany born Turkish rapper and songwriter.

== Biography ==
Born in Berlin, West Germany, Hakan is one of the first Turkish rappers, Durmuş is one of the first hardcore and gangsta rappers from Turkey. Before turning to music, he was a 36 Boys gang member growing up in Kreuzberg, and imprisoned for burglary, bank robbery, and manslaughter.

Hakan started his professional music career by joining the band Islamic Force of Boe B. In 1997, they published the album "Mesaj". After Islamic Force separated, Hakan continued as a solo artist.

So far, Hakan has released 12 albums, the latest being "Kreuzberg City" released in 2020.

== Discography ==
Year	Label	Type	Name
1997	DeDe Records	Islamic Force group album	Mesaj
2002	Rough Mix Recordings	Solo album	Çakallar
2003	Rough Mix Recordings	album with Fuat Ergin	Rapüstad
2005	Hammer Müzik	Solo album	Semt Semt Sokak
2007	Rough Mix Recordings	Solo album	Kreuzberg City
2008	Esen Müzik	Album with Ceza	Bomba Plak
2009	Fight4Music	Solo album	Volume Maximum
2012	Esen Müzik	Solo album	Orijinal
2012	Esen Müzik	Berlin Kaplanı soundtrack	Sabır (feat. Ata Demirer)
2014	Esen Müzik	Solo album	Son Mohakan
2014	Esen Müzik	Single	Ghettoda Aşk
2018	Esen Müzik	Solo album	Killa Hakan
2019	Wovie & DMC	Single	İlk Kural Saygı (feat. Ezhel & Gringo)
2019	Wovie & DMC	Solo album	Fight Kulüp
2019	Wovie & DMC	Single	Fight Kulüp (bonus tracks)
2020	Wovie	Single	Her Şey Yolundadır (feat. Eko Fresh & Ayaz Kaplı)
2020	Wovie	Single	Saniye Saniye
2020	Wovie	Single	Hodri Meydan
2020	Wovie	Single	Ne Fark Eder? (feat. Eko Fresh & Umut Timur)
2020	RedKeysMusic	Single	Bang Bang (feat. Khontkar)
2020	Königsrasse	Single	Yalaka
2020	Königsrasse	Single	Killa Sıkar
2020	Königsrasse	Solo album	Kreuzberg City
2020	Königsrasse	Single	Fight Kulüp 2 (feat. Massaka, Ceza, Contra, Anıl Piyancı, Khontkar, Summer Cem)
2020	DMC	Single	Aklımda Anılar (feat. Halil Söyletmez)
2021	Königsrasse	Single	Escobar
2021	DMC	Single	Killa (feat. Maestro and No.1)

== Productions starring ==
Year	Name	Character	TV channel	Notes
2019	Harbi Getto	Himself	TRT Belgesel	"Turkish neighborhood Kreuzberg"
