= Şanışer =

Turkish rapper

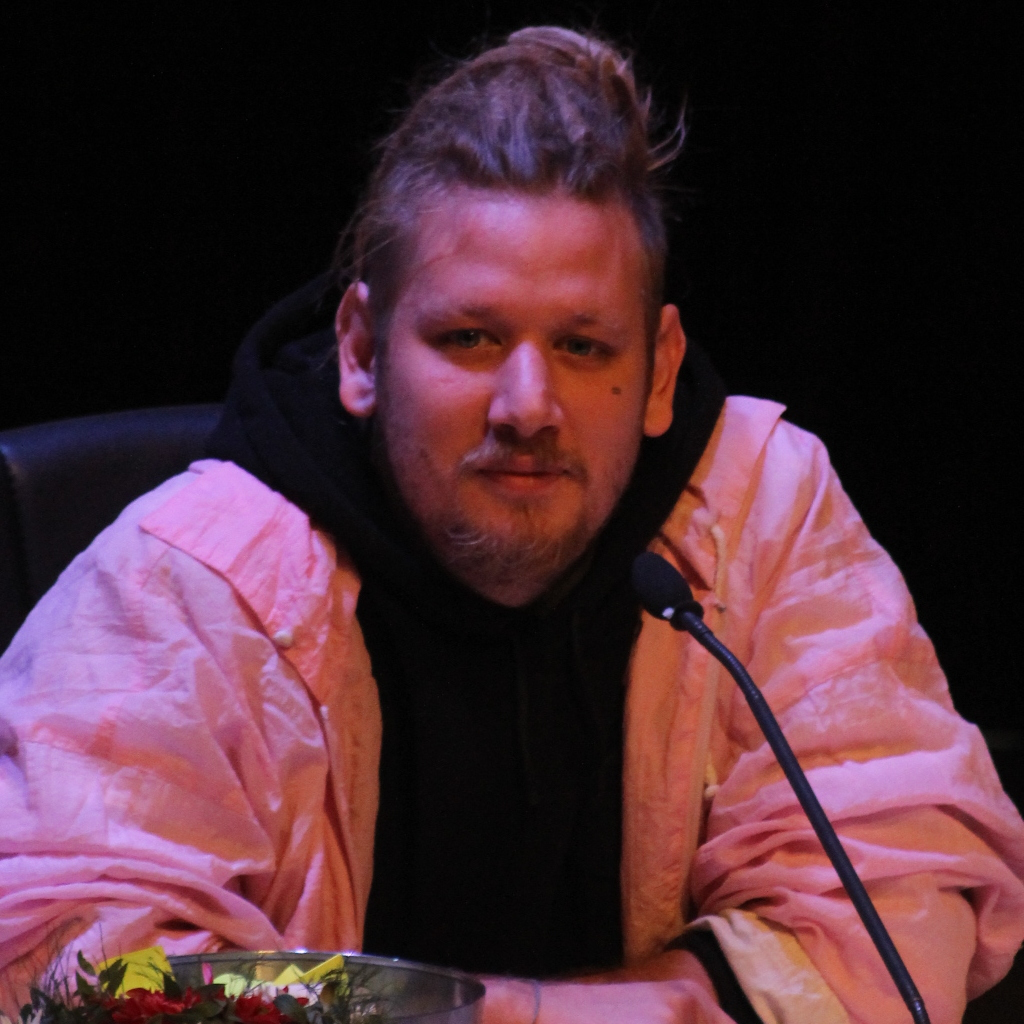
- Palaur in 2018

Background information
- Born: Sarp Palaur; 9 November 1987 (age 38); Istanbul, Turkey
- Genre: Hip hop
- Occupations: Rapper; singer; songwriter
- Years active: 2007–present

Sarp Palaur (born 9 November 1987), better known by his stage name Şanışer (which translates to English as "Infamous" or "Evil fame"), is a Turkish rapper, singer and songwriter. His 15 minute protest song titled Susamam ("I Cannot Remain Silent"), which he released together with 18 colleagues, criticized social and political issues in Turkey, including violence against women, environmental destruction, censorship, injustice, and police brutality, and became a major topic on Turkey’s public agenda in 2019, receiving 20 million views on YouTube in its first week of release.

== Life and career ==
After graduating from High school in Istanbul, he was admitted into Mugla University in 2005. He shares his musical performances online.

== Discography ==
=== Albums ===
==== Studio albums ====
- Bullshit Mixtape (with Bela, 2007)
- Ludovico (2008)
- Açık ve Net (2011)
- Onuncu Gün (2015)
- Otuzuncu Gün (2017)
- Ludovico II (2018)
- Umut (2021)

==== Compilation albums ====
- Bullshit Öncesi Trackler (2006)

==== EPs ====
- Günlüğüm (2007)
- 12-15 (2012)

=== Singles ===
- Ludovico'nun Sanatsal Devrimi (2009)
- Guerrilla Warfare II (2013)
- Aşılmaz Yollar (feat. Sehabe) (2016)
- Kapat Çeneni (feat. Alef High) (2012)
- Bazen (feat. Alef High & Cem Savaş) (2013)
- Guerrilla Warfare II (feat. Alef High) (2013)
- Ben Yazmıyorum (feat. Moskape) (2014)
- Yalan (feat. Sokrat ST) (2017)
- Bu Dünya Neyim Oluyor (feat. Siyakat)
- Kayra (feat. Mehmet Sait Akşak)
- Gel (feat. Samet Olguner) (2016)
- Dünya Koca Bir Hapis (2017)
- 96 bpm (feat. Ais Ezhel & Alef High)
- Günleri Geride Bırak (2019)
- Susamam (2019)
- Kara Geceler (feat. Sezen Aksu) (2019)
- Aynı Sokaklarda (2020)
- Yeniden (2020) (with Cem Adrian)
- Görünce Dünyamın Yıkıldığını (2020)
- Peşimde Kara Geceler (2021)
- Kuytu Köşelerde (2021)
- Tek Hayalim (2022) (with Sokrat St)
- Gitmek (Tirat) (2022)
- Vur Yüreğim (2022) (with Sertab Erener)
- Peşimde Kara Geceler (Live) (2022) (with Sertab Erener)
- Kendimi Vurdum (Live) (2022) (with Melek Mosso)
- Aşk Şarkısı (Live) (2022) (with Ayda)
- Düştüm (Live) (2022) (with Cem Adrian)
- Katil (2022)
- Kış Yağmuru (Live) (2022) (with Sena Şener)
- Görünce Dünyamın Yıkıldığını (Live) (2022) (with Emir Can İğrek)
- Geçemiyorum Serden (Live) (2022) (with Pınar Süer)
- İnsanlar (Live) (2022) (with Melis Fis)
- Kuytu Köşelerde (Live) (2022) (with Emre Aydın)
- Döne Döne (Live) (2022) (with Gökhan Türkmen)

=== Duets ===
- 2014 - Körün Gönyesi (Taladro ft. Şanışer)
- 2014 - Ben Yazmıyorum (Moskape ft. Şanışer)
- 2019 - Ruhunuz Eksik (Sehabe ft. Şanışer)
- 2014 - Yas (Rashness ft. Şanışer)
- 2015 - Nefes Alamıyorum (Zaza Batur ft. Şanışer)
- 2016 - Kara Düzen (Toprak Kardeşler ft. Şanışer)
- 2017 - Yalnız Bırak (Emar Hoca ft. Şanışer)
- 2018 - Sabah Olmuyorsa (Kezzo ft. Şanışer)
- 2018 - Siyah (Sehabe ft. Şanışer)
- 2018 - İyinin Yanı (Sehabe ft. Şanışer)
- 2018 - Proletarya (Sokrat St ft. Şanışer)
- 2018 - Yine Bana Kalırım (Şanışer ft. Sezgin Alkan)
- 2019 - En Derine (Ados ft. Şanışer)
- 2019 - Kara Geceler (Sezen Aksu ft. Şanışer)
- 2019 - Katliam 3 (Massaka ft. Şanıser)
- 2020 - Yeniden (Cem Adrian ft. Şanışer)
- 2020 - Adalet Yok (Muşta ft. Sokrat St, Şanışer)
- 2020 - Suç (Aspova ft. Şanışer)
- 2020 - Herkes Konuşur (Ados ft. Sokrat St, Şanışer)
- 2020 - Kara Toprak (Deeperise ft. Şanışer, Cem Adrian)
- 2021 - Daha Yeni Uyanmıştım (Sokrat St ft. Şanışer)
- 2021 - 6binbar (Harun Adil ft. Şanışer)
- 2022 - Romeo & Juliet (with Ebru Ceylan, Çağla Çakır and Fatih Al)
- 2022 - Dayan (Ados ft. Şanışer)
- 2022 - Yolu Yok (Çağan Şengül ft. Şanışer)
