= ADOS =

ADOS may refer to:

== Computer operating systems ==
- Access DOS, assistive software shipped with Microsoft's MS-DOS 6.2x
- ADOS (Russian operating system) (or АДОС), ca. 1989
- Advanced DOS, a project name for IBM and Microsoft's OS/2 1.0
- Arabic MS-DOS, from Microsoft
- Atari DOS, an 8-bit disk operating system used in Atari computers

== Other uses ==
- American Descendants of Slavery, a descriptive term and political movement
- Autism Diagnostic Observation Schedule, a diagnostic test
- The novel A Dream of Spring in the book series A Song of Ice and Fire

== See also ==
- AOS (disambiguation)
- DOS (disambiguation)
