= Server Uraz =

Turkish singer and rapper

- Also known as: Pit10
- Born: 23 March 1988 (age 38); Istanbul, Turkey
- Genre: Hip hop
- Occupations: Rapper; singer; songwriter

Server Uraz (born 23 March 1988) is a Turkish rapper, singer and songwriter. He made his debut as a rapper in 1998 under the nickname Pit10. After using this name for 15 years, he started releasing records under his real name in 2017. Under the name Pit10, he released more than 20 albums. He has been mentioned as an influence for rappers such as Canka, Beta, Flowart, and Deniz Gürzumar.

In his 2006 song "Ses Çıkarma", he targeted Prime Minister Recep Tayyip Erdoğan. The acquittal decision by the local court was overturned by the Supreme Court in 2009 in the case opened by Erdoğan's lawyers against him on charges of insulting Erdoğan. The song in question criticized the Erdoğan government for fighting the PKK and it concluded with the voice of Mustafa Kemal Atatürk reading the 10th Year Speech. The song also contained insults directed towards Abdullah Öcalan. In his analysis on the subject, Furkan Dilben commented that Uraz had "borrowed the disclosures of the dominant [political] ideology, and then showed that he was against it."

In 2017, with the release of his new album, Yılan Hikayesi, he stopped using the nickname Pit10 and made music under his real name afterwards. Uraz, who performed under the name Pit10 on stage for the last time in December 2015, stated that the "infamy" of the name Pit10 lies behind this decision. Uraz founded the music label Epidemik during the same period. Four of the songs from this album were turned into music videos. Evaluating the song "Olmaz" and its music video, Akşam journalist Onur Akbaş wrote, "Pouring the regrets, unhappiness, disappointments and inner loneliness of the people, Server Uraz manages to reflect these emotions to his audience with his successful cast team in the clip." In his review on the album published in Prova Magazine, Fatih Dalcı didn't find the work successful and stated, "After saying 'I was born again', I was expecting a different style and lyrical qualities and of course a different sound from his Pit10 times, but my expectations from Server Uraz remained as expectations. My score for the album is 5/10."

Server Uraz and Volkan Ayvazoğlu, nicknamed Ceg, received a prison sentence of 4 years and 2 months in January 2019 for promoting drug use in their songs. The decision was protested by many hip hop artists.

== Discography ==
=== Albums ===
- 52 Hertz, 2018
- Yılan Hikayesi, 2017

=== Singles ===
- "Parmaklıklar Ardında", 2019
- "Leylim Ley", 2019
- "Ayarımı Bozma, 2019
- "Akbaba Ziyareti", 2018
- "Köpek Öldüren", 2016
- "Melek Şeytanın Tarafında", 2016
- "Alley Alley", 2020
