= Deniz Tekin =

Turkish musician and songwriter (born 1997)

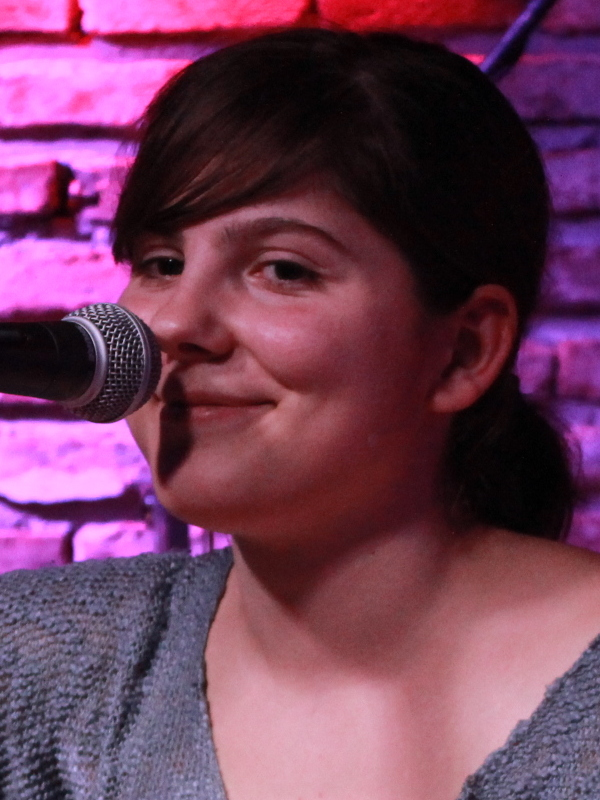

Background information
- Born: Hatice Deniz Tekin; 7 June 1997 (age 29); İzmir, Turkey
- Genre: Alternative
- Occupations: Musician; songwriter
- Instruments: Singing, guitar, bass guitar
- Years active: 2016–2024
- Website: deniztekin.net

Hatice Deniz Tekin (born 7 June 1997) is a Turkish musician and songwriter. Her interest in music began at the age of 8, when she started to play piano and flute. She joined various local music groups during her secondary and high school years. At the age of 16, she began performing live music in small cafes. At the same time, she shared her own recordings under the nickname Daphead on various music platforms and made covers of known songs and attracted attention. In 2017, she released her first studio album Kozakuluçka.

== Life and career ==
She was born in İzmir as a child of a civil servant and spent her first years in Konak. Her parents studied dentistry and she spent her childhood in different provinces. She first went to Mardin with her family and finished primary school there. Then she completed her secondary and high school education in Gaziantep. Her interest in music started with piano and flute with the encouragement of her father. In Gaziantep, she shared her works on music sharing platforms such as SoundCloud and attracted attention. Her recordings during this period were listened to between 1 and 7 million times on YouTube. After creating an adequate audience, she gave concerts in big cities such as Istanbul, Ankara, İzmir and Antalya. In an interview in 2015, Turkish singer Kalben drew attention to the instruments and voice of Tekin. After leaving Gaziantep, she started studying Western Languages and Literature at Boğaziçi University. In 2017, at the age of nineteen, she released her first studio album Kozakuluçka, which consists of nine songs. In this album, she also covered songs such as "Beni Vur" by Ahmet Kaya and Yusuf Hayaloğlu. Later she performed a number of songs together with Can Ozan. In 2022 she got together with Geeva Flava and Dilan Balkay to put together her second EP called Mana. She once played bass for Yaşlı Amca in 2023.

== Discography ==
Albums

- Kozakuluçka (2017)
- Yüzyıllardır Aynı Dert (2023)
- Ev Kayıtları (2026)

EPs

- Kuyu (2022)
- Mana (2023)

Singles

- Hep Oturup Bekledim (2017)
- Çözülmez (2018)
- Yıldızlar (2019)
- Güneşe Doğru (2020)
- Olmayacak İşler (2021)
- Aşkın Bu Sarhoşluğu (2022)
- Derde İhanet Edemem (feat. Cihan Mürtezaoğlu, 2023)
- Bir Vahayı Deniz Sandım (İlk Versiyon) (2023)
- Uyumsuz (2023)
