= Fuat Ergin =

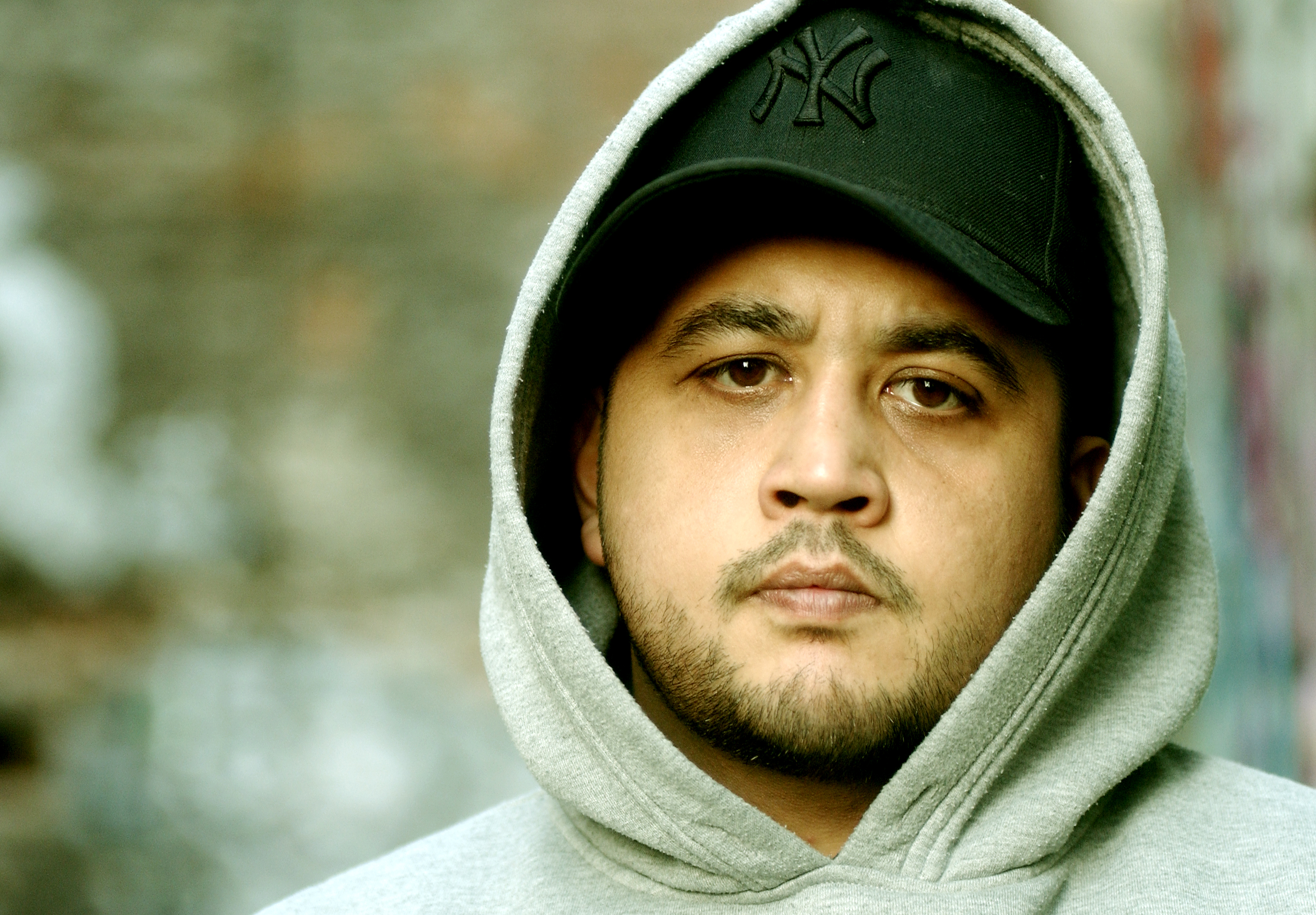

Background information
- Also known as: Yeksin Mercek · Rapüstad · Bonobo · Panzer
- Born: 30 October 1972 (age 53); West Berlin, West Germany
- Origin: Turkey
- Genre: Hip hop
- Occupations: Rapper; singer; songwriter
- Years active: 1995–present
- Labels: Royal Bunker (1999—2001); Hammer Müzik (2001—2003); Iremrecords (2004—2005); West Berlin Records (2019—present)

Fuat Ergin (born 30 October 1972), is a Turkish rapper, singer and songwriter.

== Life and career ==
Ergin was born in West Berlin on October 30, 1972, to a family from Şile. Ergin, who completed his primary school education in Berlin, returned to Turkey permanently with his family in 1984. He finished his secondary school education in Şile.

He was introduced to Hip-Hop culture while he was in high school. Ergin, who lost his father in 1986 and his mother in 1989, returned to Germany as part of 'Family Reunification' in December 1989 (1 month after the fall of the Berlin Wall).

He wrote his first rap song in English in 1992; He has been writing Turkish lyrics since 1995. Starting from 1992, he performed at hip hop jams in Berlin; He gave many concerts in almost every city in Germany, Turkey, Austria, Netherlands, Sweden and Northern Cyprus.

He made his first professional recording in Hassickdir? in 1995. He did it with the album called. The album was released in 1999. M.O.R. was released by the German record label Royalbunker in 2001. He became known with the compilation album titled.

He also conducted interviews with leading hip hop artists who came to Berlin to give concerts during these years. His interviews were published in the hip hop magazine Miks News between 1993 and 1995. Fuat interviewed: Beastie Boys, Nas, Fugees, Blade, Onyx, Gunshot, Das EFX, Readykill, House of Pain, Goats, Gang Starr'dan Guru, Gravediggaz, Boo-Yaa T.R.I.B.E. is located.

Between 1995 and 1996, he gave concerts and rap training for Hip Hop Mobile with the support of the German government. He held a rap workshop at Berlin Hip Hop Haus in 1997–1998. In this workshop, he gave rap lessons to German and Turkish children between the ages of 8 and 16.

Fuat went on his first German tour with DJ Hype in 1999. Arsonists (New York), DJ Vadim (St. Petersburg), Del The Funky Homosapien (L.A. Oakland), Casual (L.A. Oakland), X Man (New York), C.V.E. He performed in concerts with important names such as (L.A.). In 2002, he recorded duets with Busdriver from Project Blowed and Riddlore from Los Angeles-based C.V.E. He was featured on RZA's Wu-Tang Clan The World According to RZA album, which was released worldwide in the same year.

In 2003 – 2004, he played in the theater at Berlin Theater Zerbrochene Fenster. The play "36 Street" was staged 16 times between these dates. In the same year, 2003, their duet album Rapüstad with Killa Hakan was released.

In the summer of 2004, he organized a rap workshop for Turkish students between the ages of 8 and 16 at Bizim E.V. in Berlin Kreuzberg. He gave a concert with the same students at Karneval Der Kulturen.

Fuat, who has continued his career in Turkey since September 2004, gave concerts with Ceza in Europe and Turkey. In 2005, he released the album "Her Ayın Elemanı" under the label İrem Records. He released his album Kalbüm in February 2009.

The artist, who appeared in 13 episodes of the TV series "Pusat"; He served as a jury in the competition called Rapstar, which was broadcast on Star.

He taught rap to children at the Children's Festival organized by Istanbul Culture and Arts Foundation, Minifest and Istanbul Metropolitan Municipality City Theatres. He organized a Rap Workshop at Sabancı University in May 2010.

Together with the artist Aslı Çavuşoğlu, he signed a song project called "191/205" using words that TRT banned the use of in 1985. The song "191/205", which was featured in Çavuşoğlu's exhibitions held in Istanbul and Paris, was released on vinyl. The background of the piece was made by İsmail Genç, taking samples from Turkish jazz musician Erol Pekcan.

He composed the music for the Bahar Korçan fashion show within the scope of 2010 Istanbul Fashion Week/Istanbul Fashion Week. The fashion show named "Listen" took place on TRT Istanbul Radio.

Fuat Ergin took part in contemporary artist Halil Altındere's video work titled Wonderland, together with the music group Tahribad-ı İsyan. This video was acquired as a permanent work at MoMa, the world's most important museum of contemporary arts in New York.

He released his new album called “Omurga” in 2019. In his album, released after a 10-year break, he talked about Gezi Park events and social problems. In 2022, he released his album '50 Kalibre'.

He is married to Müjde Yazıcı, one of the editors of Milliyet Newspaper.

== Discography ==
- Unknown Date: Deli Ahmet Oğlu
- 1999: Hassickdir?
- 2001 : Hassickdir? 2 Demo
- 2001: Hassickdir? 2
- 2002: Bonobo 1 Panzer
- 2002: Hassickdir? 3
- 2003: Rapüstad (split album with Killa Hakan)
- 2005: Her Ayın Elemanı
- 2009: Kalbüm
- 2010 : Bende Tank Var (Bootleg)
- 2018 : Greatest Hitz (Compilation Album)
- 2019: Omurga 1 & Omurga 2
- 2021: Krematoryum EP
- 2022: 50 Kalibre
