= Sertab Erener discography =

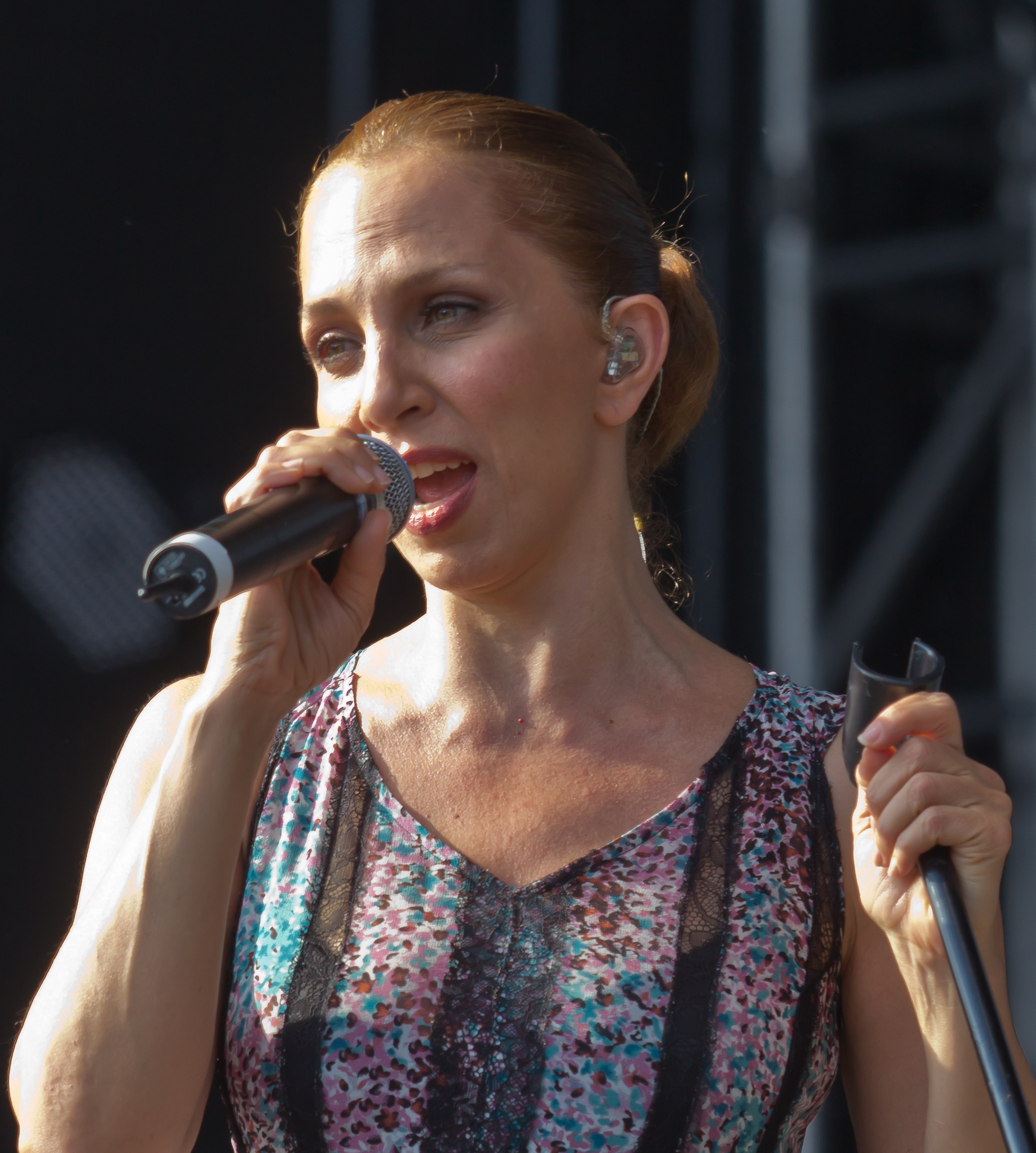
- Erener performing in Cologne, 2014
- Studio albums: 11
- EPs: 3
- Live albums: 2
- Compilation albums: 3
- Singles: 15

Turkish pop singer Sertab Erener's discography consists of eleven studio albums, two live albums, three compilation albums, one cover album, three extended plays (EP), and fifteen singles. After graduating from Mimar Sinan Fine Arts University, she worked as a backing vocalist for Sezen Aksu, and released her first studio album Sakin Ol! in 1992, which sold more than a million copies. In 1994, her second studio album, Lâ'l, was released, followed by Sertab Gibi in 1997.

In 1999, she released her fourth and self-titled studio album Sertab Erener. She was later featured on Puerto Rican singer Ricky Martin's song "Private Emotion"; this duet, was included in Martin's 1999 album. Erener's first compilation album, Sertab, was released across Europe in 2000. In 2001, she released the album Turuncu. On 24 May 2003, she represented Turkey at the Eurovision Song Contest 2003 with the song "Everyway That I Can", which earned Turkey 167 points and marked its first victory in the contest, making it the host for the Eurovision Song Contest 2004. "Everyway That I Can" entered the music charts of many European countries and ranked number-one in Sweden and Greece. The single received a platinum certification from Greece. Erener released her first English album, No Boundaries, in 2004. The song "Here I Am" from this album ranked sixth on the Greek music chart.

In 2005, her seventh studio album, Aşk Ölmez, was released. After this album, she did not publish a studio album for five years but continued to prepare and release various other works. In 2007, she released the compilation albums The Best of Sertab Erener and Sertab Goes to the Club. In the same year, she gave a concert to mark the fifteenth year of her music career and sold it in December 2008 as a live album under the name Otobiyografi. One year later, she released the split album Painted On Water together with Demir Demirkan.

In June 2010, Erener released her eighth studio album Rengârenk. The songs "Bu Böyle" and "Açık Adres" were released as promotional singles from the album in the late 2009; "Bu Böyle" ranked first on Türkçe Top 20, while "Açık Adres" ranked third. The other four songs from the album that were made into music videos also entered the national music charts; "Koparılan Çiçekler", "Rengârenk" and "İstanbul" ranked second, while "Bir Damla Gözlerimde" ranked seventh on the list. In April 2012, she released the Turkish classical album Ey Şûh-i Sertab as a tribute to her father. The album sold 78,995 copies in Turkey and became one of the best-selling albums of the year. In April 2013, Erener released her ninth studio album Sade. The album's lead single, "İyileşiyorum", ranked second on Turkey's official music chart.

== Albums ==
=== Studio albums ===
List of albums and sales figures
| Album | Album info | Sales |
|---|---|---|
| Sakin Ol! | Released: 28 September 1992 (TR); Label: Tempa, Foneks; Format: CD, cassette, digital download | Turkey: 1,000,000 |
| Lâ'l | Released: 14 October 1994 (TR); Label: Tempa, Foneks; Format: CD, cassette, digital download | Turkey: 640,000 |
| Sertab Gibi | Released: 28 February 1997 (TR); Label: İmaj, Sony; Format: CD, cassette, digital download | Turkey: 147,000 |
| Sertab Erener | Released: 24 March 1999 (TR); Label: Columbia; Format: CD, cassette, digital download | Turkey: 427,000 |
| Turuncu | Released: 25 May 2001 (TR); Label: Sony; Format: CD, cassette, digital download | Turkey: 260,000 |
| No Boundaries | Released: 19 January 2004 (EU); Label: Columbia, Sony; Format: CD, cassette, digital download | |
| Aşk Ölmez | Released: 12 May 2005 (TR); Label: Simya; Format: CD, cassette, digital download | Turkey: 160,000 |
| Rengârenk | Released: 7 June 2010 (TR); Label: DMC; Format: CD, digital download | Turkey: 150,000 |
| Sade | Released: 13 April 2013 (TR); Label: DMC, GNL; Format: CD, digital download | Turkey: 50,000 |
| Kırık Kalpler Albümü | Released: 6 June 2016 (TR); Label: DMC, GNL; Format: CD, digital download | Turkey: |
| Ben Yaşarım | Released: 12 June 2020 (TR); Label: Kala; Format: CD, digital download | Turkey: |
| Her Dem Yeşil | Released: 21 July 2023 (TR); Label: Kala; Format: CD, digital download | Turkey: |
| Her Dem Akustik | Released: 15 April 2024 (TR); Label: Kala; Format: Digital download | Turkey: |

=== Cover albums ===
List of albums and sales figures
| Album | Album info | Sales |
|---|---|---|
| Ey Şûh-i Sertab | Released: 12 April 2012 (TR); Label: GNL; Format: CD, digital download | Turkey: 78,995 |

=== Compilation albums ===
List of albums
| Album | Album info |
|---|---|
| Sertab | Released: February 2000 (EU); Label: Columbia, Sony; Format: CD, cassette |
| The Best of Sertab Erener | Released: 15 March 2007 (TR); Label: Columbia, Sony; Format: CD, cassette, digital download |
| Sertab Goes to the Club | Released: 14 May 2007 (TR); Label: DMC, Simya; Format: CD, cassette, digital download |

=== Live albums ===
List of albums
| Album | Album info |
|---|---|
| Sertab Erener Otobiyografi: 15. Sanat Yılı Konseri | Released: 6 December 2008 (TR); Label: İmaj, Simya; Format: DVD, CD+DVD |
| Ah Şişede Lâl | Released: 2 November 2020 (TR); Label: Kala; Format: LP, digital download |
| Garajda Live - Ben Yaşarım | Released: 25 March 2022 (TR); Label: Kala; Format: Digital download |

=== EPs ===
List of albums
| Album | Album info |
|---|---|
| Bu Yaz | Released: 2000 (TR); Label: Columbia; Format: CD, cassette |
| Love (with Demir Demirkan) | Released: 4 March 2010 (TR); Şirket: GNL, Motéma; Format: Digital download |
| Senin Mutluluğun Benim Doğum Günüm | Released: 2012 (TR); Label: GNL, DMC; Format: CD, cassette |
| İyiliğe Ninniler | Released: 16 November 2021 (TR); Label: Bepanthol Baby; Format: Digital download |
| Lullabies Spreading Goodness | Released: 14 July 2023 (TR); Label: Bepanthol Baby; Format: Digital download |

=== Split albums ===
List of albums
| Album | Album info |
|---|---|
| Painted on Water (with Demir Demirkan) | Released: 8 October 2009 (TR); Label: DMC, GNL, Motéma; Format: CD, digital download |

== Charts ==
=== International ===
List of singles, release date and album name
| Single | Year | Peak | | | | | | | | | | Certifications | Album |
| Single | Year | GER | AUS | AUT | BEL (FL) | UK | NLD | IRL | SWE | CHE | GRC | Certifications | Album |
|---|---|---|---|---|---|---|---|---|---|---|---|---|---|
| "Everyway That I Can" | 2003 | 12 | 63 | 10 | 6 | 72 | 4 | 35 | 1 | 17 | 1 | IFPI GRC: Platinum | No Boundaries |
| "Here I Am" | 2003 | — | — | — | 41 | — | — | — | 58 | 64 | 6 | | No Boundaries |

=== National ===
List of singles, release date and album name
| Single | Year | Peak | Album |
| Single | Year | TR | Album |
|---|---|---|---|
| "Bu Böyle" | 2009 | 1 | Rengârenk |
| "Açık Adres" | 2009 | 3 | Rengârenk |
| "Koparılan Çiçekler" | 2010 | 2 | Rengârenk |
| "Rengârenk" | 2010 | 1 | Rengârenk |
| "Bir Damla Gözlerimde" | 2010 | 7 | Rengârenk |
| "İstanbul" | 2010 | 2 | Rengârenk |
| "İyileşiyorum" | 2013 | 2 | Sade |
"—" indicates that the songs were not included in the lists or the results were not disclosed.

== Other works ==
List of other works and their year of publication
| Song | Year | Album |
|---|---|---|
| "Akdeniz" | 1987 | 1987 Kuşadası Golden Pigeon Music Competition |
| "Hasret" | 1989 | Turkey Eurovision Song Contest 1989 Qualifying |
| "Sen Benimlesin" | 1990 | Turkey Eurovision Song Contest 1990 Qualifying |
| "Private Emotion" (duet with Ricky Martin) | 1999 | Ricky Martin |
| "Dağlar Dağlar" | 2002 | Yüreğimdeki Barış Şarkıları |
| "One More Cup of Coffee" | 2003 | Masked and Anonymous film soundtrack |
| "Dos Gardenias" | 2005 | Şans Kapıyı Kırınca film soundtrack |
| "Music" | 2005 | Crossing the Bridge: The Sound of Istanbul film soundtrack |
| "Çocuklar Gibi" | 2006 | 41 Kere Maşallah |
| "Sen Ağlama" (duet with Tuluğ Tırpan) | 2007 | Onno Tunç Şarkıları |
| "Dım Dım" | 2012 | 01 |
| "Ne Kavgam Bitti Ne Sevdam" | 2013 | Aysel'in |
| "Her Şeye Rağmen" | 2017 | En Samimisinden Alakasız Şarkılar - Yaşar Gaga |
| "Boş Sokak" | 2023 | Fecri Ebcioğlu 100 Yıllık Şarkılar |

== Music videos ==
List of music videos
| Video | Year | Director(s) |
|---|---|---|
| "Sakin Ol" | 1992 | Samim Değer |
| "Aldırma Deli Gönlüm" | 1992 | —N/a |
| "Ateşle Barut" | 1992 | —N/a |
| "Vurulduk" | 1992 | —N/a |
| "Oyun Bitti" | 1992 | —N/a |
| "O, Ye" | 1993 | —N/a |
| "Suçluyum" | 1993 | —N/a |
| "Sevdam Ağlıyor" | 1994 | —N/a |
| "Rüya" | 1995 | Abdullah Oğuz |
| "Aslolan Aşktır" | 1997 | —N/a |
| "İncelikler Yüzünden" | 1997 | Nizamettin Erener |
| "Aaa" | 1997 | —N/a |
| "Seyrüsefer" | 1997 | —N/a |
| "Yara" | 1998 | —N/a |
| "Yanarım" | 1999 | Tolga Erener |
| "Zor Kadın" | 1999 | —N/a |
| "Vur Yüreğim" | 1999 | —N/a |
| "Yolun Başında" | 1999 | —N/a |
| "Zor Kadın" (duet with Voice Male) | 1999 | Peter Dunne |
| "Private Emotion" (duet with Ricky Martin) | 2000 | Francis Lawrence |
| "Aşk / Φως" (duet with Mando) | 2000 | —N/a |
| "Kumsalda" | 2001 | —N/a |
| "Söz Bitti" | 2001 | —N/a |
| "Kendime Yeni Bir Ben Lazım" | 2001 | Serdar Erener |
| "Everyway That I Can" | 2003 | Umur Turagay |
| "Here I Am" | 2003 | —N/a |
| "Aşk Ölmez, Biz Ölürüz" | 2005 | Devrim Yalçın |
| "Satılık Kalpler Şehri" | 2005 | —N/a |
| "Kim Haklıysa" | 2005 | Devrim Yalçın |
| "Yanarım" (Remix) | 2007 | —N/a |
| "Mecbursun" (Remix) | 2007 | Baran Baran |
| "Sevdam Ağlıyor" (Remix) | 2008 | —N/a |
| "Hayat Beklemez" | 2008 | Murad Küçük |
| "Bu Böyle" | 2009 | —N/a |
| "Açık Adres" | 2009 | Burak Ertaş |
| "Koparılan Çiçekler" | 2010 | Burak Ertaş |
| "Rengârenk" | 2010 | Burak Ertaş |
| "Bir Damla Gözlerimde" | 2010 | Burak Ertaş |
| "İstanbul" | 2011 | Burak Ertaş |
| "Bir Çaresi Bulunur" | 2011 | Hande Türkel |
| "Dım Dım" | 2012 | Dağhan Celayir |
| "İyileşiyorum" | 2013 | Cem Talu |
| "Öyle de Güzel" | 2013 | Can Ulkay |
| "Ben Öyle Birini Sevdim ki" | 2014 | Burak Ertaş |
| "Söz" | 2014 | Peter Hakan Demir |
| "Tesadüf Aşk" | 2015 | Burak Ertaş |
| "Kız Leyla" | 2015 | Çağan Irmak |
| "Kime Diyorum" | 2016 | Can Saban |
| "Olsun" | 2016 | Mehmet Çelebi |
| "Bastırın Kızlar" | 2018 | Sinan Tuncay |
| "Belki de Dönerim" | 2018 | Mehmet Çelebi |
| "Bu Dünya" | 2020 | Talip Özer |
| "Kafanı Yorma" | 2020 | Gürdeniz Bursalı |
| "Aç Sesini" | 2020 | Gürdeniz Bursalı & Sertab Erener |
| "Who's Gonna End" | 2021 | Enes Erkan |
| "Vur Yüreğim" | 2022 | Burak Ertaş |
| "Peşimde Kara Geceler (Live)" | 2022 | Şanışer |
| "Kumsalda" (duet with Ozbi) | 2023 | —N/a |
| "Sen İste" | 2024 | Ömer Çelik |
