= 2021 in film =

2021 in film is an overview of events, including the highest-grossing films, award ceremonies, festivals, a list of country-specific lists of films released, and movie programming.

== Evaluation of the year ==
In his article highlighting the best movies of 2021, Richard Brody of The New Yorker said, "From an artistic perspective, 2021 has been an excellent cinematic vintage, yet the bounty is shadowed by an air of doom. The reopening of theatres has brought many great movies—some of which were postponed from last year—to the big screen, but fewer people to see them. The biggest successes, as usual, have been superhero and franchise films. The French Dispatch has done respectably in wide release, and Licorice Pizza is doing superbly on four screens in New York and Los Angeles, but few, if any, of the year's best films are likely to reach high on the box-office charts. The shift toward streaming was already under way when the pandemic struck, and as the trend has accelerated it's had a paradoxical effect on movies. On the one hand, a streaming release is a wide release, happily accessible to all (or to all subscribers). On the other, an online release usually registers as a nonevent, and many of the great movies hardly make a blip on the mediascape despite being more accessible than ever."

== Highest-grossing films ==
Highest-grossing films of 2021
Rank	Title	Distributor	Worldwide gross
1	Spider-Man: No Way Home	Sony	$1,921,426,073 (Note: Excludes grosses from subsequent re-releases.)
2	The Battle at Lake Changjin	Bona	$909,596,236
3	Hi, Mom	Lian Ray	$841,674,419
4	No Time to Die	MGM / Universal	$774,253,007
5	F9	Universal	$726,229,501
6	Detective Chinatown 3	Warner Bros. / Wanda	$686,257,563
7	Venom: Let There Be Carnage	Sony	$506,863,592
8	Godzilla vs. Kong	Warner Bros. / Toho	$470,116,094
9	Shang-Chi and the Legend of the Ten Rings	Disney	$432,243,292
10	Dune	Warner Bros.	$411,000,000

=== 2021 box office records ===
- Worldwide, the global box office ended the year at $21.4 billion, a figure 78% higher than 2020.
- China was the highest-grossing country of 2021 with $7.3 billion.
- In the United States and Canada, theaters earned an estimated $4.55 billion throughout 2021, a statistic 100% higher than 2020's $2.28 billion and 60% lower than 2019's $11.4 billion.

==== Film records ====
- The Marvel Cinematic Universe (MCU) became the first film franchise to gross $23 billion, $24 billion, and $25 billion with the releases of Black Widow, Shang-Chi and the Legend of the Ten Rings, Eternals, and Spider-Man: No Way Home. Additionally, the MCU became the first film franchise to have ten films gross over $1 billion with the release of Spider-Man: No Way Home.
- Spider-Man: No Way Home became the 48th film to gross $1 billion worldwide (the first film to do so since 2019's Star Wars: The Rise of Skywalker prior to the COVID-19 pandemic), surpassed Spider-Man: Far From Home as Sony's highest-grossing film of all time, and attained the distinction of being the highest-grossing film not to be released in China (one of the world's biggest box office markets).
  - Also, it is the third film to surpass the $800 million mark in North America.
  - In Latin America, No Way Home became the all-time highest-grossing film in Mexico ($75 million), and the second all-time highest in Brazil ($55 million), Central America ($12.6 million) and Ecuador ($7.9 million).
- The Battle at Lake Changjin became the highest-grossing non-English film of all time as well as highest-grossing Chinese film of all time.
  - The Battle at Lake Changjin also became the second highest-grossing film in a single market, after Star Wars: The Force Awakens (2015) in the United States.
- Hi, Mom became the highest-grossing film by a solo female director, surpassing the record set by Wonder Woman (2017).
- Detective Chinatown 3 set the record for the biggest opening weekend in a single territory, surpassing the record set by Avengers: Endgame in 2019, and had the tenth highest-grossing opening weekend on release.
- Avatar became the highest-grossing film of all time again after a re-release in China increased its gross past $2.8 billion.
- The anime film Demon Slayer: Mugen Train (2020) released in North America in April 2021, with its opening weekend gross of $19.5 million setting the record as the biggest opening for any foreign-language film released in North America.

== Events ==
=== Award ceremonies ===
2021 film award ceremonies
Date	Event	Host	Location(s)
January 16	26th Forqué Awards	Entidad de Gestión de Derechos de los Productores Audiovisuales	Madrid, Spain
February 28	78th Golden Globe Awards	Hollywood Foreign Press Association	Beverly Hills, California, US; Manhattan, New York, US
March 2	8th Feroz Awards	Asociación de Informadores Cinematográficos de España	Madrid, Spain
March 6	35th Goya Awards	Academy of Cinematographic Arts and Sciences	Málaga, Spain
March 7	26th Critics' Choice Awards	Broadcast Film Critics Association	Santa Monica, California, US
March 12	46th César Awards	Académie des Arts et Techniques du Cinéma	Paris, France
March 21	13th Gaudí Awards	Catalan Film Academy	Barcelona, Catalonia, Spain
March 21	73rd Writers Guild of America Awards	Writers Guild of America, East; Writers Guild of America West	Ceremony held virtually
March 24	32nd Producers Guild of America Awards	Producers Guild of America	Ceremony held virtually
April 4	27th Screen Actors Guild Awards	SAG-AFTRA	Los Angeles, California, US
April 10	73rd Directors Guild of America Awards	Directors Guild of America	Ceremony held virtually
April 11	74th British Academy Film Awards	British Academy of Film and Television Arts	London, England, UK
April 16	48th Annie Awards	ASIFA-Hollywood	Los Angeles, California, US
April 22	36th Independent Spirit Awards	Independent Spirit Awards	Santa Monica, California, US
April 24	41st Golden Raspberry Awards	Golden Raspberry Awards Foundation	Los Angeles, California, US
April 25	93rd Academy Awards	Academy of Motion Picture Arts and Sciences	Los Angeles, California, US
May 3	67th National Film Awards	Directorate of Film Festivals	New Delhi, India
May 11	66th David di Donatello	Accademia del Cinema Italiano	Rome, Italy
May 13	57th Baeksang Arts Awards	Ilgan Sports	Gyeonggi Province, South Korea
September 18–19	9th South Indian International Movie Awards	Vibri Media Group	Hyderabad, Telangana, India
October 3	8th Platino Awards	Entidad de Gestión de Derechos de los Productores Audiovisuales	Madrid, Spain
October 7	30th Buil Film Awards	Busan Ilbo	Busan, South Korea
October 8	15th Asian Film Awards	The Asian Film Awards Academy	Busan, South Korea
October 26	46th Saturn Awards	Academy of Science Fiction, Fantasy and Horror Films	Los Angeles, California, US
November 14	20th Santosham Film Awards	Santosham Magazine	Hyderabad, Telangana, India
November 26	42nd Blue Dragon Film Awards	Sports Chosun	Seoul
November 27	58th Golden Horse Awards	Motion Picture Development Foundation R.O.C.	Taipei, Taiwan
December 11	34th European Film Awards	European Film Academy	Berlin, Germany
December 11	27th Forqué Awards	Entidad de Gestión de Derechos de los Productores Audiovisuales	Madrid, Spain

=== Film festivals ===
List of some of the film festivals for 2021 that have been accredited by the International Federation of Film Producers Associations (FIAPF).

2021 film festivals
Date	Event	Host	Location
January 28 – February 3	2021 Sundance Film Festival	Sundance Film Festival	Park City, Utah, United States
March 1–5	71st Berlin International Film Festival	Berlin International Film Festival	Berlin, Germany
July 6–17	2021 Cannes Film Festival	Cannes Film Festival	Cannes, France
August 4–14	74th Locarno Film Festival	Locarno Film Festival	Locarno, Switzerland
September 1–11	78th Venice International Film Festival	Venice Film Festival	Venice, Italy
September 9–18	2021 Toronto International Film Festival	Toronto International Film Festival	Toronto, Ontario, Canada
September 17–25	69th San Sebastián International Film Festival	San Sebastián International Film Festival	San Sebastián, Spain
October 6–15	26th Busan International Film Festival	Busan International Film Festival	Busan, South Korea
November 20–28	52nd International Film Festival of India	Directorate of Film Festivals	Goa, India

== Awards ==
Category/Organization	79th Golden Globe Awards January 9, 2022		Producers, Directors, Screen Actors and Writers Guild Awards February 27 – March 20, 2022	75th BAFTA Awards March 13, 2022	27th Critics' Choice Awards March 13, 2022	94th Academy Awards March 27, 2022
Category/Organization	Drama	Musical or Comedy	Producers, Directors, Screen Actors and Writers Guild Awards February 27 – March 20, 2022	75th BAFTA Awards March 13, 2022	27th Critics' Choice Awards March 13, 2022	94th Academy Awards March 27, 2022
Best Picture	The Power of the Dog	West Side Story	CODA	The Power of the Dog		CODA
Best Director	Jane Campion; The Power of the Dog					
Best Actor	Will Smith; King Richard	Andrew Garfield; Tick, Tick... Boom!	Will Smith; King Richard			
Best Actress	Nicole Kidman; Being the Ricardos	Rachel Zegler; West Side Story	Jessica Chastain; The Eyes of Tammy Faye	Joanna Scanlan; After Love	Jessica Chastain; The Eyes of Tammy Faye	
Best Supporting Actor	Kodi Smit-McPhee; The Power of the Dog		Troy Kotsur; CODA			
Best Supporting Actress	Ariana DeBose; West Side Story					
Best Screenplay, Adapted	Kenneth Branagh; Belfast		Sian Heder; CODA		Jane Campion; The Power of the Dog	Sian Heder; CODA
Best Screenplay, Original	Kenneth Branagh; Belfast		Adam McKay & David Sirota; Don't Look Up	Paul Thomas Anderson; Licorice Pizza	Kenneth Branagh; Belfast	
Best Animated Film	Encanto				The Mitchells vs. the Machines	Encanto
Best Original Score	Hans Zimmer; Dune		—N/a	Hans Zimmer; Dune		
Best Original Song	"No Time to Die"; No Time to Die		—N/a	—N/a	"No Time to Die"; No Time to Die	
Best Foreign Language Film	Drive My Car		—N/a	Drive My Car		
Best Documentary (Note: From 2016 onward, the category was shifted from the Critics' Choice Awards to the ancillary Critics' Choice Documentary Awards.)	—N/a		Summer of Soul			

Palme d'Or (74th Cannes Film Festival):

Titane, directed by Julia Ducournau, France

Golden Lion (78th Venice International Film Festival):

Happening, directed by Audrey Diwan, France

Golden Bear (71st Berlin International Film Festival):

Bad Luck Banging or Loony Porn (Babardeală cu bucluc sau porno balamuc), directed by Radu Jude, Romania

People's Choice Award (46th Toronto International Film Festival):

Belfast, directed by Kenneth Branagh, United Kingdom

== 2021 films ==
=== By country/region ===
- List of American films of 2021
- List of Australian films of 2021
- List of Bangladeshi films of 2021
- List of British films of 2021
- List of Canadian films of 2021
- List of Chinese films of 2021
- List of French films of 2021
- List of Hong Kong films of 2021
- List of Indian films of 2021
- List of Japanese films of 2021
- List of Nigerian films of 2021
- List of Philippine films of 2021
- List of Russian films of 2021
- List of South Korean films of 2021
- List of Spanish films of 2021
- List of Sri Lankan films of 2021

=== By genre/medium ===
- List of animated feature films of 2021
- List of horror films of 2021
- List of science fiction films of 2021

== Deaths ==
Month	Date	Name	Age	Country	Profession	Notable films
January	3	Barbara Shelley	88	UK	Actress	Village of the Damned; Quatermass and the Pit
January	4	Tanya Roberts	71	US	Actress	Sheena; A View to a Kill
January	4	Lee Heung-kam	88	Hong Kong	Actress	Dances with Dragon; All's Well, Ends Well
January	4	Gregory Sierra	83	US	Actor	Papillon; The Towering Inferno
January	5	James Greene	89	Ireland	Actor	Brothers of the Head; Empire of the Sun
January	5	John Richardson	86	UK	Actor	She; One Million Years B.C.
January	6	Antonio Sabàto Sr.	77	Italy	Actor	One Dollar Too Many; Shoot Twice
January	7	Michael Apted	79	UK	Director	Coal Miner's Daughter; Nell
January	7	Val Bettin	97	US	Voice Actor	The Great Mouse Detective; Shrek
January	7	Marion Ramsey	73	US	Actress, Singer	Police Academy; Return to Babylon
January	8	Steve Carver	75	US	Director	An Eye for an Eye; Lone Wolf McQuade
January	8	Mike Henry	84	US	Actor	Smokey and the Bandit; The Green Berets
January	9	John Reilly	86	US	Actor	Deal of the Century; Touch and Go
January	11	Tord Peterson	94	Sweden	Actor	Grisjakten; Echoes from the Dead
January	11	Stacy Title	56	US	Director	The Last Supper; The Bye Bye Man
January	12	Mona Malm	85	Sweden	Actress	Fanny and Alexander; After the Wedding
January	14	Peter Mark Richman	93	US	Actor	The Black Orchid; Friendly Persuasion
January	15	Dale Baer	70	US	Animator	The Lion King; Who Framed Roger Rabbit
January	16	Charlotte Cornwell	71	UK	Actress	The Saint; White Hunter Black Heart
January	18	Jean-Pierre Bacri	69	France	Actor, Screenwriter	Subway; Smoking/No Smoking
January	18	Perry Botkin Jr.	87	US	Composer	Skyjacked; Tarzan, the Ape Man
January	18	Juan Carlos Tabío	77	Cuba	Director, Screenwriter	Strawberry and Chocolate; 7 Days in Havana
January	20	Ian Wilson	81	UK	Cinematographer	The Crying Game; Emma
January	21	Nathalie Delon	79	France	Actress	Le Samouraï; Bluebeard
January	21	Rémy Julienne	90	France	Stuntman	The Italian Job; Violent City
January	23	Walter Bernstein	101	US	Screenwriter, Director	The Front; Paris Blues
January	23	Tony Ferrer	86	Philippines	Actor	Blind Rage; The Vengeance of Fu Manchu
January	23	Alberto Grimaldi	95	Italy	Producer	The Good, the Bad and the Ugly; Gangs of New York
January	23	Hal Holbrook	95	US	Actor	All the President's Men; Into the Wild
January	23	Trisha Noble	76	Australia	Actress, Singer	Carry On Camping; The Private Eyes
January	24	Bruce Kirby	95	US	Actor	Crash; Stand by Me
January	24	Gunnel Lindblom	89	Sweden	Actress	The Virgin Spring; The Seventh Seal
January	25	Tseng Chang	90	Hong Kong	Actor	Dim Sum Funeral; 2012
January	27	Cloris Leachman	94	US	Actress	Young Frankenstein; The Last Picture Show
January	28	Vasily Lanovoy	87	Russia	Actor	Soldiers of Freedom; The Three Musketeers
January	28	Cicely Tyson	96	US	Actress	Sounder; The Help
January	30	Allan Burns	85	US	Screenwriter	A Little Romance; Just the Way You Are
February	1	Jonas Gricius	92	Lithuania	Cinematographer	Hamlet; The Blue Bird
February	1	Robert C. Jones	84	US	Film Editor, Screenwriter	Coming Home; Bound for Glory
February	3	Haya Harareet	89	Israel	Actress	Ben-Hur; The Interns
February	5	Christopher Plummer	91	Canada	Actor	The Sound of Music; Beginners
February	7	Giuseppe Rotunno	97	Italy	Cinematographer	All That Jazz; The Leopard
February	7	Moufida Tlatli	73	Tunisia	Director, Film Editor	The Season of Men; Sama
February	8	Jean-Claude Carrière	89	France	Screenwriter, Actor	The Unbearable Lightness of Being; Taking Off
February	9	John Hora	80	US	Cinematographer	Gremlins; The Howling
February	11	Joan Weldon	90	US	Actress	Them!; Day of the Badman
February	12	Antonio Giménez-Rico	82	Spain	Director, Screenwriter	Family Portrait; The Disputed Vote of Mr. Cayo
February	12	Christopher Pennock	76	US	Actor	Night of Dark Shadows; Frances
February	12	Lynn Stalmaster	93	US	Casting Director	Judgment at Nuremberg; Superman
February	15	Lucía Guilmáin	83	Mexico	Actress	Length of War; Darker Than Night
February	17	Martha Stewart	98	US	Actress	In a Lonely Place; Are You with It?
February	18	Andrey Myagkov	82	Russia	Actor	The Brothers Karamazov; Vertical Race
February	20	David de Keyser	93	UK	Actor	Yentl; Sunshine
February	22	Giancarlo Santi	81	Italy	Director	The Grand Duel; Quando c'era lui... caro lei!
February	24	Alan Robert Murray	66	US	Sound Engineer	Letters from Iwo Jima; American Sniper
February	24	Ronald Pickup	80	UK	Actor	The Mission; Darkest Hour
February	27	Ng Man-tat	70	Hong Kong	Actor	Shaolin Soccer; A Moment of Romance
February	28	Theona Bryant	89	US	Actress	The Private Lives of Adam and Eve; The Last Time I Saw Archie
March	1	Enrique San Francisco	65	Spain	Actor	Navajeros; Colegas
March	2	Gil Rogers	87	US	Actor	The Children; Eddie Macon's Run
March	3	Nicola Pagett	75	Egypt	Actress	Anne of the Thousand Days; An Awfully Big Adventure
March	4	Tony Hendra	79	UK	Screenwriter	The Missing Link; The Great White Hype
March	6	David Bailie	83	South Africa	Actor	Pirates of the Caribbean; The Timber
March	8	Leon Gast	85	US	Documentarian	When We Were Kings; Smash His Camera
March	8	Trevor Peacock	89	UK	Actor	Hamlet; Quartet
March	9	Biff McGuire	94	US	Actor	Serpico; The Thomas Crown Affair
March	9	Isela Vega	81	Mexico	Actress	Bring Me the Head of Alfredo Garcia; Barbarosa
March	11	Isidore Mankofsky	89	US	Cinematographer	The Muppet Movie; Somewhere in Time
March	11	Peter Patzak	76	Austria	Director, Screenwriter	The Unicorn; Tramps
March	11	Norman J. Warren	78	UK	Director	Satan's Slave; Terror
March	14	Henry Darrow	87	US	Actor	The Hitcher; Runaway Jury
March	15	Yaphet Kotto	81	US	Actor	Live and Let Die; Alien
March	17	Antón García Abril	87	Spain	Composer	Texas, Adios; Pancho Villa
March	18	Richard Gilliland	71	US	Actor	Bug; Star Kid
March	22	Susana Canales	87	Spain	Actress	Black Sky; John Paul Jones
March	22	Tatyana Lolova	87	Bulgaria	Actress	Indian Summer; Toplo
March	22	May Wynn	93	US	Actress	The Caine Mutiny; The White Squaw
March	23	George Segal	87	US	Actor	Who's Afraid of Virginia Woolf?; A Touch of Class
March	24	Craig Grant	52	US	Actor	No Sudden Move; Bamboozled
March	24	Kunie Tanaka	88	Japan	Actor	Kwaidan; Sanjuro
March	24	Jessica Walter	80	US	Actress	Play Misty for Me; Grand Prix
March	25	Larry McMurtry	84	US	Screenwriter	The Last Picture Show; Brokeback Mountain
March	25	Bertrand Tavernier	79	France	Director, Screenwriter	Round Midnight; Death Watch
March	28	Liu Kai-chi	67	Hong Kong	Actor	Cageman; Beast Stalker
April	1	Lee Aaker	77	US	Actor	Jeopardy; Hondo
April	3	Lois de Banzie	90	US	Actress	Annie; Sister Act
April	3	Gloria Henry	98	US	Actress	Miss Grant Takes Richmond; Rancho Notorious
April	3	John Paragon	66	US	Actor, Director	Pee-wee's Big Adventure; UHF
April	4	Zygmunt Malanowicz	83	Poland	Actor	Knife in the Water; Landscape After the Battle
April	5	Robert Fletcher	98	US	Costume Designer	Star Trek: The Motion Picture; Fright Night
April	5	Paul Ritter	54	UK	Actor	Quantum of Solace; The Eagle
April	6	Walter Olkewicz	72	US	Actor	Twin Peaks: Fire Walk with Me; 1941
April	7	James Hampton	84	US	Actor	The Longest Yard; Teen Wolf
April	8	Richard Rush	91	US	Director, Screenwriter	The Stunt Man; Color of Night
April	9	Earl "DMX" Simmons	50	US	Actor, Rapper	Romeo Must Die; Exit Wounds
April	11	Giannetto De Rossi	78	Italy	Makeup Artist	High Tension; Dune
April	11	Joseph Siravo	66	US	Actor	Carlito's Way; The Report
April	12	André Maranne	94	France	Actor	The Pink Panther; Battle of Britain
April	16	Helen McCrory	52	UK	Actress	Harry Potter; Hugo
April	16	Anthony Powell	85	UK	Costume Designer	Travels with My Aunt; Death on the Nile
April	16	Felix Silla	84	Italy	Stuntman, Actor	Return of the Jedi; Little Cigars
April	16	Mari Törőcsik	85	Hungary	Actress	Music Box; Sunshine
April	19	Emília Došeková	83	Slovakia	Actress, Screenwriter, Singer	Surviving Life; Cruel Joys
April	20	Monte Hellman	91	US	Director, Film Editor	The Shooting; Ride in the Whirlwind
April	22	Charles Fries	92	US	Producer, Executive	Cat People; Out of Bounds
April	29	Johnny Crawford	75	US	Actor, Singer	Indian Paint; Village of the Giants
April	29	Billie Hayes	96	US	Actress	Li'l Abner; Pufnstuf
April	29	Frank McRae	80	US	Actor	48 Hrs.; Last Action Hero
May	1	Olympia Dukakis	89	US	Actress	Moonstruck; Steel Magnolias
May	1	Willy Kurant	87	Belgium	Cinematographer	China Moon; Under the Sun of Satan
May	2	Jacques d'Amboise	86	US	Choreographer, Actor	Seven Brides for Seven Brothers; Carousel
May	4	Chuck Hicks	93	US	Stuntman, Actor	Star Trek II: The Wrath of Khan; The Ring
May	7	Tawny Kitaen	59	US	Actress	Bachelor Party; Witchboard
May	8	Graeme Ferguson	91	Canada	Producer, Cinematographer	Hubble 3D; A Beautiful Planet
May	9	Neil Connery	83	UK	Actor	O.K. Connery; The Body Stealers
May	11	Norman Lloyd	106	US	Actor	Dead Poets Society; Saboteur
May	11	Buddy Van Horn	92	US	Stuntman, Director	The Dead Pool; Pink Cadillac
May	15	Roy Scammell	88	UK	Stuntman	Alien; Willow
May	18	Charles Grodin	86	US	Actor	Midnight Run; Beethoven
May	19	Paul Mooney	79	US	Actor	Bamboozled; The Buddy Holly Story
May	24	Desiree Gould	76	US	Actress	Sleepaway Camp; Tales of Poe
May	24	Robert Green Hall	47	US	Makeup Artist	Body Snatchers; Secretary
May	24	Samuel E. Wright	74	US	Actor, Singer	The Little Mermaid; Bird
May	26	Jerome Hellman	92	US	Producer	Midnight Cowboy; Coming Home
May	26	Paul Soles	90	Canada	Actor	The Score; The Incredible Hulk
May	27	Lorina Kamburova	29	Bulgaria	Actress	Nightworld; Leatherface
May	27	Shane Briant	74	UK	Actor	Lady Chatterley's Lover; The Mackintosh Man
May	29	Gavin MacLeod	90	US	Actor	Operation Petticoat; The Sand Pebbles
May	31	Peter Del Monte	77	Italy	Director, Screenwriter	Traveling Companion; Etoile
May	31	Arlene Golonka	85	US	Actress	Hang 'Em High; The In-Laws
June	3	Ernie Lively	74	US	Actor	Turner & Hooch; Passenger 57
June	4	Clarence Williams III	81	US	Actor	Purple Rain; The Legend of 1900
June	5	Paulo Thiago	75	Brazil	Director, Screenwriter	Sagarana: The Duel; The Long Haul
June	9	Cynthia Hargrave	64	US	Producer	Bottle Rocket; Perfume
June	9	Libuše Šafránková	68	Czech Republic	Actress	My Sweet Little Village; Kolya
June	10	Joyce MacKenzie	95	US	Actress	Tarzan and the She-Devil; Broken Arrow
June	11	John Gabriel	90	US	Actor	El Dorado; The Story of Ruth
June	12	Dennis Berry	76	US	Actor, Director	La Collectionneuse; Borsalino
June	13	Ned Beatty	83	US	Actor	Network; Deliverance
June	13	David Lightfoot	61	Australia	Producer	Wolf Creek; Rogue
June	14	Lisa Banes	65	US	Actress	Cocktail; Gone Girl
June	16	Frank Bonner	79	US	Actor	You Can't Hurry Love; Equinox
June	16	Allen Midgette	82	US	Actor	La commare secca; Before the Revolution
June	19	Leon Greene	89	UK	Actor	The Devil Rides Out; A Funny Thing Happened on the Way to the Forum
June	20	Joanne Linville	93	US	Actress	Scorpio; A Star Is Born
June	21	Nina Divíšková	84	Czech Republic	Actress	Morgiana; Wild Flowers
June	22	Antonio Salines	84	Italy	Actor	Senso '45; Happy as Lazzaro
June	23	Clare Peploe	79	Tanzania	Screenwriter, Director	Zabriskie Point; Besieged
June	23	Robert Sacchi	89	US	Actor	The Man with Bogart's Face; Die Hard 2
June	25	Olga Barnet	69	Russia	Actress	Solaris; The Flight of Mr. McKinley
June	25	John Erman	85	US	Actor, Director	The Benny Goodman Story; Stella
June	25	June Kenney	87	US	Actress	Earth vs. the Spider; Bloodlust!
June	27	Alison Greenspan	48	US	Producer	The Lucky One; If I Stay
July	4	Luminița Gheorghiu	71	Romania	Actress	Child's Pose; The Death of Mr. Lazarescu
July	5	Raffaella Carrà	78	Italy	Actress, Singer	The Organizer; Von Ryan's Express
July	5	Richard Donner	91	US	Director, Producer	Superman; Lethal Weapon
July	5	Vladimir Menshov	81	Russia	Director, Actor	Moscow Does Not Believe in Tears; Möbius
July	5	William Smith	88	US	Actor	Conan the Barbarian; Red Dawn
July	6	Suzzanne Douglas	64	US	Actress	School of Rock; Jason's Lyric
July	7	Dilip Kumar	98	India	Actor	Mughal-e-Azam; Shakti
July	7	Robert Downey Sr.	85	US	Director, Screenwriter, Actor	Putney Swope; To Live and Die in L.A.
July	7	Chick Vennera	74	US	Actor	Yanks; The Milagro Beanfield War
July	11	Charlie Robinson	75	US	Actor	The Black Gestapo; Set It Off
July	15	Libero De Rienzo	44	Italy	Actor	I Can Quit Whenever I Want; Fort Apache Napoli
July	17	Pilar Bardem	82	Spain	Actress	Nobody Will Speak of Us When We're Dead; Variety
July	17	Jacqueline Sassard	81	France	Actress	Estate Violenta; Accident
July	20	Françoise Arnoul	90	France	Actress	Forbidden Fruit; French Cancan
July	23	John Cornell	80	Australia	Screenwriter, Producer, Director	Crocodile Dundee; Almost an Angel
July	23	Richard Green	58	Australia	Actor	Boxing Day; The Rover
July	24	Jackie Mason	93	US	Actor, Comedian	The Jerk; Caddyshack II
July	25	Doug Falconer	69	Canada	Producer	The Warrior's Way; Forsaken
July	26	Rick Aiello	65	US	Actor	Do the Right Thing; Jungle Fever
July	27	Saginaw Grant	85	US	Actor	The Lone Ranger; The Ridiculous 6
July	27	Jean-François Stévenin	77	France	Actor, Director, Screenwriter	Brotherhood of the Wolf; Cold Moon
July	30	Jack Couffer	96	US	Cinematographer	Jonathan Livingston Seagull; The Savage Eye
July	31	Alvin Ing	89	US	Actor	The Gambler; Stir Crazy
July	31	Mark Tarlov	69	US	Producer, Director	Christine; Copycat
August	3	Jean Hale	82	US	Actress	In Like Flint; The St. Valentine's Day Massacre
August	3	Jørgen Langhelle	55	Norway	Actor	Hold My Heart; The Thing
August	3	Marcia Nasatir	95	US	Producer, Executive	The Big Chill; Ironweed
August	7	Brad Allan	48	Australia	Stuntman	Rush Hour 2; Hellboy II: The Golden Army
August	7	Markie Post	70	US	Actress	There's Something About Mary; Cook Off!
August	7	Jane Withers	95	US	Actress	Giant; Captain Newman, M.D.
August	9	Alex Cord	88	US	Actor	Stagecoach; The Brotherhood
August	9	Pat Hitchcock	93	UK	Actress	Strangers on a Train; Psycho
August	9	Ken Hutchison	72	UK	Actor	Ladyhawke; Straw Dogs
August	12	Una Stubbs	84	UK	Actress	Summer Holiday; Golden Years
August	14	Piera Degli Esposti	83	Italy	Actress	Il Divo; My Mother's Smile
August	15	Gianfranco D'Angelo	84	Italy	Actor	La liceale; Taxi Girl
August	17	Rock Demers	87	Canada	Producer	The Peanut Butter Solution; Vincent and Me
August	19	Sonny Chiba	82	Japan	Actor	The Street Fighter; Kill Bill: Volume 1
August	19	Li Hsing	91	Taiwan	Director	Execution in Autumn; The Personals
August	23	Brick Bronsky	57	US	Actor	Sgt. Kabukiman N.Y.P.D.; The Quest
August	23	Michael Nader	76	US	Actor	Beach Blanket Bingo; Fled
August	23	Rosita Quintana	96	Argentina	Actress, Singer	Susana; Women Who Work
August	25	Zdenka Procházková	95	Czech Republic	Actress	The Fifth Horseman Is Fear; The Devil's Mistress
August	29	Ed Asner	91	US	Actor	Up; Elf
August	29	Peggy Farrell	89	US	Costume Designer	The Sentinel; Gloria
August	31	Michael Constantine	94	US	Actor	My Big Fat Greek Wedding; The Hustler
August	31	Ferhan Şensoy	70	Turkey	Actor	When Luck Breaks the Door; Pardon
September	1	George Martin	83	Spain	Actor	Clint the Stranger; Red Blood, Yellow Gold
September	2	Mikis Theodorakis	96	Greece	Composer	Zorba the Greek; Serpico
September	4	Mort Ransen	88	Canada	Director, Screenwriter, Producer	Margaret's Museum; Bayo
September	5	Ion Caramitru	79	Romania	Actor	Amen.; Charlie Countryman
September	6	Jean-Paul Belmondo	88	France	Actor	Breathless; Borsalino
September	6	Nino Castelnuovo	84	Italy	Actor	Rocco and His Brothers; The Umbrellas of Cherbourg
September	6	Anthony Johnson	56	US	Actor	Friday; House Party
September	6	Michael K. Williams	54	US	Actor	12 Years a Slave; Gone Baby Gone
September	7	Eiichi Yamamoto	80	Japan	Director, Screenwriter	Belladonna of Sadness; Space Battleship Yamato
September	8	Art Metrano	84	US	Actor	Teachers; Going Ape!
September	9	Jon Gregory	77	UK	Film Editor	Three Billboards Outside Ebbing, Missouri; In Bruges
September	11	Fran Bennett	84	US	Actress	Wes Craven's New Nightmare; Foxfire
September	11	Gloria Warren	95	US	Actress, Singer	Cinderella Swings It; Bells of San Fernando
September	12	Ben Best	46	US	Actor, Screenwriter	The Foot Fist Way; Superbad
September	12	Sondra James	82	US	Actress, Casting Director	The Sixth Sense; Joker
September	13	Don Collier	92	US	Actor	The War Wagon; The Undefeated
September	14	Norm Macdonald	61	Canada	Actor	Billy Madison; Dirty Work
September	15	Gavan O'Herlihy	70	US	Actor	Willow; Never Say Never Again
September	16	Jane Powell	92	US	Actress, Singer	Seven Brides for Seven Brothers; Royal Wedding
September	17	Basil Hoffman	83	US	Actor	Ordinary People; My Favorite Year
September	18	Mario Camus	86	Spain	Director, Screenwriter	The Wind's Fierce; Werther
September	21	Willie Garson	57	US	Actor	Sex and the City; There's Something About Mary
September	21	Melvin Van Peebles	89	US	Director, Actor, Screenwriter	Sweet Sweetback's Baadasssss Song; Watermelon Man
September	22	Roger Michell	65	UK	Director	Notting Hill; Venus
September	23	David H. DePatie	91	US	Producer	The Pink Panther; The Ant and the Aardvark
September	26	Kjersti Holmen	65	Norway	Actress	Orion's Belt; Max Manus: Man of War
September	27	Heinz Lieven	93	Germany	Actor	This Must Be the Place; Remember
September	28	Tommy Kirk	79	US	Actor	Old Yeller; The Shaggy Dog
September	29	Ravil Isyanov	59	Russia	Actor	K-19: The Widowmaker; Defiance
October	3	Cynthia Harris	87	US	Actress	Isadora; Three Men and a Baby
October	3	Tomas Norström	65	Sweden	Actor	A Cure for Wellness; The White Viking
October	3	Marc Pilcher	53	UK	Makeup Artist	Mary Queen of Scots; Solo: A Star Wars Story
October	8	Chang Yung-hsiang	91	Taiwan	Screenwriter	Execution in Autumn; If I Were for Real
October	10	Bob Herron	97	US	Stuntman	The Untouchables; L.A. Confidential
October	10	Luis de Pablo	91	Spain	Composer	The Hunt; The Spirit of the Beehive
October	10	Ruthie Tompson	111	US	Animator	Fantasia; The Rescuers
October	12	Brian Goldner	58	US	Producer	Transformers; Battleship
October	14	Diane Weyermann	66	US	Producer	An Inconvenient Truth; Citizenfour
October	15	Dorothy Steel	95	US	Actress	Black Panther; Jumanji: The Next Level
October	16	Felipe Cazals	84	Mexico	Director, Screenwriter	Canoa: A Shameful Memory; The Heist
October	16	Geoffrey Chater	100	UK	Actor	Gandhi; Barry Lyndon
October	16	Betty Lynn	95	US	Actress	June Bride; Cheaper by the Dozen
October	18	Val Bisoglio	95	US	Actor	Saturday Night Fever; The Frisco Kid
October	18	Ralph Carmichael	94	US	Composer	The Blob; The Cross and the Switchblade
October	18	Jo-Carroll Dennison	97	US	Actress	Winged Victory; The Jolson Story
October	18	William Lucking	80	US	Actor	Red Dragon; The Rundown
October	19	Leslie Bricusse	90	UK	Composer	Victor/Victoria; Willy Wonka & the Chocolate Factory
October	19	Jack Angel	90	US	Voice Actor	Toy Story; A.I. Artificial Intelligence
October	20	Michael Laughlin	82	US	Director, Screenwriter, Producer	Two-Lane Blacktop; Strange Invaders
October	21	George Butler	78	UK	Documentarian	Pumping Iron; Going Upriver
October	21	Halyna Hutchins	42	Ukraine	Cinematographer	Darlin'; Archenemy
October	22	Peter Scolari	66	US	Actor	That Thing You Do!; The Polar Express
October	26	Mort Sahl	94	US	Actor	Don't Make Waves; Johnny Cool
October	28	Camille Saviola	71	US	Actress	The Purple Rose of Cairo; Addams Family Values
October	29	Puneeth Rajkumar	46	India	Actor	Appu; Raajakumara
October	31	Dean Shek	72	Hong Kong	Actor, Producer	Drunken Master; A Better Tomorrow II
November	1	Yuri Klepikov	86	Russia	Screenwriter	The Ascent; The Seventh Companion
November	4	Lionel Blair	92	UK	Actor	The Limping Man; Absolute Beginners
November	6	Peter Aykroyd	65	Canada	Actor	Doctor Detroit; Nothing but Trouble
November	6	Clifford Rose	92	UK	Actor	Marat/Sade; The Iron Lady
November	7	Dean Stockwell	85	US	Actor	Paris, Texas; Married to the Mob
November	9	Jerry Douglas	88	US	Actor	Gunn; Mommie Dearest
November	9	Roy Holder	75	UK	Actor	Romeo and Juliet; Pride & Prejudice
November	11	Henry Woolf	91	UK	Actor	The Ruling Class; Gorky Park
November	13	Emi Wada	84	Japan	Costume Designer	Ran; House of Flying Daggers
November	14	Bobby Clark	77	US	Actor	Invasion of the Body Snatchers; Ransom!
November	17	Art LaFleur	78	US	Actor	Field of Dreams; The Sandlot
November	17	Igor Savochkin	58	Russia	Actor	Night Watch; Leviathan
November	19	Will Ryan	72	US	Voice Actor	The Little Mermaid; The Land Before Time
November	21	Lou Cutell	91	US	Actor	Pee-wee's Big Adventure; Honey, I Shrunk the Kids
November	22	Marie Versini	81	France	Actress	Paris Blues; Is Paris Burning?
November	24	Yvonne Wilder	84	US	Actress	West Side Story; Seems Like Old Times
November	25	Don Phillips	80	US	Casting Director, Producer	Dazed and Confused; Fast Times at Ridgemont High
November	26	Stephen Sondheim	91	US	Composer, Songwriter	West Side Story; Dick Tracy
November	27	Eddie Mekka	69	US	Actor	A League of Their Own; Dreamgirls
November	29	Arlene Dahl	96	US	Actress	Ambush; Journey to the Center of the Earth
November	29	David Gulpilil	68	Australia	Actor	Crocodile Dundee; Rabbit-Proof Fence
December	2	Antony Sher	72	UK	Actor	Mrs Brown; Shakespeare in Love
December	3	Denis O'Brien	80	US	Producer	Monty Python's Life of Brian; Time Bandits
December	4	Martha De Laurentiis	67	US	Producer	Hannibal; Red Dragon
December	5	Mirelle Hernández	46	Mexico	Makeup artist	Miss Bala; Desperados
December	9	Carmen Salinas	82	Mexico	Actress	Calzonzin inspector; Under the Same Moon
December	9	Larry Sellers	72	US	Actor	Wayne's World 2; Revolution
December	9	Lina Wertmüller	93	Italy	Director, Screenwriter	Seven Beauties; Swept Away
December	9	Cara Williams	96	US	Actress	Boomerang!; The Defiant Ones
December	10	Michael Nesmith	78	US	Singer, Actor, Producer	Head; Repo Man
December	11	Jack Hedley	92	UK	Actor	For Your Eyes Only; Of Human Bondage
December	12	Vicente Fernández	81	Mexico	Singer, Actor	The Bricklayer; Coyote and Bronca
December	13	Verónica Forqué	66	Spain	Actress	Kika; Year of Enlightment
December	13	Sergei Solovyov	77	Russia	Director, Screenwriter	Assa; Wild Pigeon
December	17	Chen Sung-young	80	Taiwan	Actor	A City of Sadness; Gorgeous
December	19	Sally Ann Howes	91	UK	Actress, Singer	Chitty Chitty Bang Bang; Dead of Night
December	20	Pierre Cassignard	56	France	Actor	The Conquest; Seventh Heaven
December	21	Jaime Comas	85	Spain	Screenwriter, Producer	A Fistful of Dollars; One Man's Hero
December	22	Richard Conway	79	US	Special Effects Artist	Brazil; The Adventures of Baron Munchausen
December	23	Joan Didion	87	US	Screenwriter	The Panic in Needle Park; A Star Is Born
December	24	Harvey Evans	83	US	Actor, Dancer	West Side Story; Bank Shot
December	25	Jean-Marc Vallée	58	Canada	Director, Producer, Film Editor	Dallas Buyers Club; Wild
December	30	Stephen J. Lawrence	82	US	Composer	Bang the Drum Slowly; Alice, Sweet Alice
December	30	Denis O'Dell	98	UK	Producer	A Hard Day's Night; The Ritz
December	30	Renato Scarpa	82	Italy	Actor	Don't Look Now; Suspiria
December	31	Betty White	99	US	Actress	Lake Placid; The Proposal

== Film debuts ==
- Ángela Cervantes − Girlfriends
- Phoebe Dynevor – The Colour Room
- Myles Erlick – West Side Story
- Mark Eydelshteyn – First Snow
- Jude Hill – Belfast
- Cooper Hoffman – Licorice Pizza
- Mel Jarnson – Mortal Kombat
- Leung Chung-hang – Zero to Hero
- Anson Lo – Showbiz Spy
- Paul Mescal – The Lost Daughter
- Katy O'Brian – Sweet Girl
- Joshua Odjick – Wildhood
- Aaron Pierre – Old
- Isaac Powell – Dear Evan Hansen
- María Romanillos – The Consequences
- Mason Thames – The Black Phone
- Leo Woodall – Cherry
- Rachel Zegler – West Side Story
