= Dabak =

Dabak may refer to:

- Dabak Daba Aisa
- Anand Dabak, American engineer
- Asuman Dabak, Turkish actress
