= Sertab Erener =

Turkish singer, songwriter and composer (born 1964)

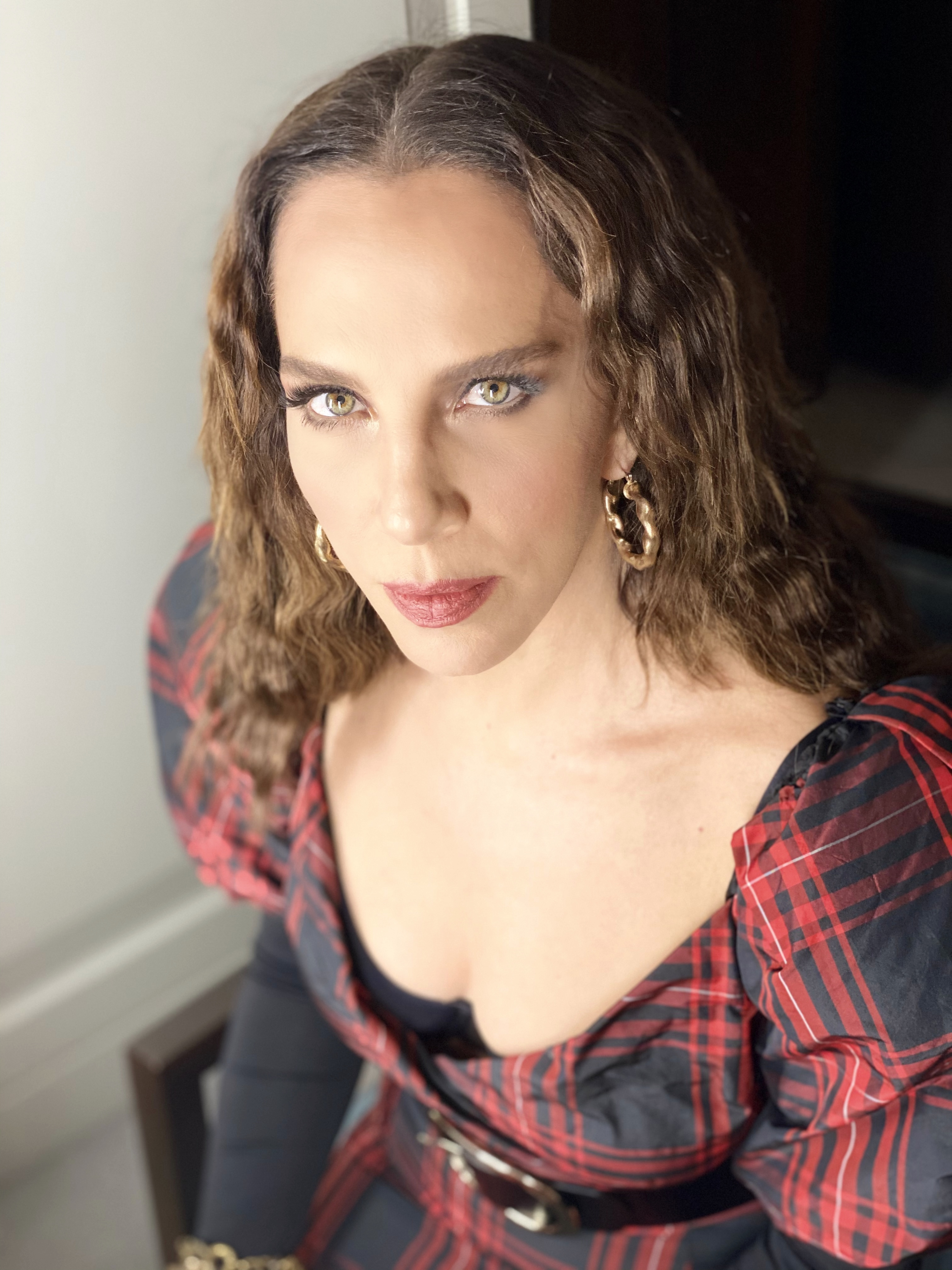
- Erener in 2019
- Born: 4 December 1964 (age 61); Istanbul, Turkey
- Education: Mimar Sinan Fine Arts University
- Occupations: Singer-songwriter; record producer
- Spouses: Aykut Altın (m. 1985; div. 1988) Levent Yüksel (m. 1990; div. 1996) Emre Kula (m. 2015)
- Relatives: Nil Karaibrahimgil (sister-in-law)
- Awards: State Medal of Distinguished Service
- Musical career
- Genres: Pop; classical Turkish; rock
- Years active: 1987–present
- Label: Kala Music
- Website: www.sertab.com

Sertab Erener (born 4 December 1964) is a Turkish singer, songwriter and composer. With her coloratura soprano voice, she started working as a backing vocalist for Sezen Aksu, and with Aksu's help she released her first studio album in the 1990s. Because of her education in classical music, she initially had difficulties in performing pop music. Although she did experimental works from time to time, she eventually preferred to focus on making pop music instead of avant-garde works, in order to make her music heard by a larger audience. In some of her works, she combined Western music and Eastern music, and benefited from operas as well as classical Turkish music with ethnic elements. With her entrance to Europe's market in the early 2000s, many of her works were also sold in Turkey as well as European countries.

With Sezen Aksu's help, she made her debut in 1992 with the album Sakin Ol!, and made herself known as a Turkish pop music artist in the 1990s by releasing the albums Lâ'l (1994), Sertab Gibi (1997) and Sertab Erener (1999). From these albums, the songs "Sakin Ol!", "Aldırma Deli Gönlüm", "Ateşle Barut", "Sevdam Ağlıyor", "Aslolan Aşktır", "Yanarım", "Zor Kadın" and "Vur Yüreğim" became number-one hits in Turkey. In the early 2000s, she continued her work by releasing the songs "Kumsalda" and "Kendime Yeni Bir Ben Lazım". She won the Eurovision Song Contest 2003 with the song "Everyway That I Can", marking Turkey's first victory in the competition. In 2004, she released the album No Boundaries, followed by Aşk Ölmez in 2005. After five years, she released another Turkish studio album Rengârenk in 2010, and the hit songs "Bu Böyle", "Açık Adres" and "Koparılan Çiçekler" made the album a successful work, and marked her return to the music market. After Rengârenk, she released the album Ey Şuh-i Sertab (2012), which was dedicated to her father. At the same year, she received the Best Female TSM Soloist award at the Golden Butterfly Awards. In 2013, her new album Sade was released. The songs "İyileşiyorum", "Öyle de Güzel" and "Söz" all became hits in Turkey. In 2016, with the release of Kırık Kalpler Albümü, Erener stated that she was returning to her 90s style. The album received favorable reviews, and "Kime Diyorum" and "Olsun" both became hit songs in Turkey.

Erener has been praised for her music style and is one of the most successful artists who were discovered by Sezen Aksu. Due to her championship in Eurovision, she received the State Medal of Distinguished Service. In 2014, Hürriyet named her in its list of "91 Symbols of the 91st Anniversary of the Republic". Aside from her career as a singer, she also taught music at Müjdat Gezen Art Center for one year. Erener has been married three times, the second of which was to Levent Yüksel during 1990–96. She married Emre Kula in 2015. Throughout her career she has won seven Kral TV Video Music Awards as well as two Golden Butterfly Awards, and has received various other nominations.

== Life and career ==
=== 1964–1991: Early life and career beginnings ===
Sertab Erener was born on 4 December 1964 in Istanbul as the second child of Nizamettin and Yücel Erener. She spent her childhood in Eyüp, Istanbul. Her mother's family is from Yugoslavia but moved to Ayvalık, Balıkesir. Her mother Yücel, had studied painting at Istanbul State Fine Arts Academy and graduated in 1957, but did not continue her career after marriage. Her paternal family was from Eastern Anatolia region. Her paternal grandfather was from Muş, while her paternal grandmother was an Arab from Siirt. Her father Nizamettin, was born in Diyarbakır. He took music lessons form Şerif İçli and worked as a soloist on Istanbul Radio for one month. Despite his interest in music, he eventually preferred to become a lawyer. Sertab's elder brother is Serdar, who had a great influence on her during her childhood. Sertab Erener grew up with her father's passion for Turkish classical music. Due to his fondness of the song "Ey Şûh-i Sertab", her father decided to name her Sertab, meaning the "main light (radiance)". After finishing her primary school, she got the permission to enroll in Liceo Italiano di Istanbul, but her father sent her to Işık High School instead. During those years, she suffered from jaundice and at the age of 11 was diagnosed with ulcerative colitis, for which she was hospitalized numerous times during her high school years. While she was at the second grade of high school, she became immensely interested in music and due to her fondness of opera music, she enrolled in Istanbul University State Conservatory to study opera. After taking singing lessons for a while, she continued her studies at Mimar Sinan Fine Arts University. She studied at Mimar Sinan University, Opera Major Arts and Concert Singing Department, but left the school before completing her studies. Although she was taking classical music lessons at the time, she decided to continue her career with opera, however, since she was not able to obtain what she expected from opera in her student years, she started to work as a stage soloist. At the age of 21, she got married and this marriage lasted for three years.

Sertab joined Sezen Aksu's birthday party in 1987 at Memduh Paşa Mansion as a soloist. She was chosen by the organizer of the party to perform at the event. Sezen Aksu noted Erener's drabness during their first meeting, but she liked her voice and offered her a job as a backing vocalist. Erener initially did not want to accept the offer and later said: "She [Sezen Aksu] asked me to become her backing vocalist. I didn't accept it. Because I was already a soloist. It sounded like taking a step backwards. I thought I shouldn't be a vocalist because of my position." Later, due to her friend Levent Yüksel's closeness with Aksu, Erener accepted the offer and became her backing vocalist. She later participated in the 1987 Kuşadası Golden Pigeon Music Competition under her married name, Sertab Altın, and performed the song "Akdeniz". In 1989, she joined Klips ve Onlar and performed the song "Hasret" in the competition to represent Turkey in the Eurovision Song Contest 1989. They were placed third and lost the chance to represent the country in the contest. In 1990, she again joined the first-stage competitions, performed the song "Sen Benimlesin" and ranked 6th. In the same year, she married Levent Yüksel. She later described her second marriage in an interview: "Levent was one of my close friends; we were pals. He had girlfriends, I had boyfriends. We worked in the same orchestra. After divorce, I didn't even realize how it happened, I can't explain it, but it was a kind of affection or something like that. I had a lot of friends, but Levent was always special to me, and had a separate place. I think I was feeling something special about him. It happened spontaneously without even pushing."

=== 1992–1998: Sakin Ol!, Lâ'l and Sertab Gibi ===
Erener's name began to be heard in the early 1990s with Sezen Aksu's help. She prepared her first studio album with the help of Aksu, Uzay Heparı, Aysel Gürel and Garo Mafyan. Aksu spent a lot of money and time to help Erener in her album's preparations. Erener later talked about her experience: "I learned this country and land's music with Sezen's help. It was after meeting her that I became truly interested in the music that I was making here [in Turkey]. That is why Sezen had a lot of trouble when she was making that cassette for me, thinking about where in this [music industry] I belong to. Because people were saying 'Sertab sings well in English, but not in Turkish.' Those words had divided her mind in two parts." The album, titled Sakin Ol!, was released in 1992. Sertab Erener made a huge debut with the album's lead single, also titled "Sakin Ol!". To assist Erener, both Aksu and Uzay Heparı appeared on the song's music video. Milliyet later wrote that thanks to Sakin Ol! Erener was brought suddenly to the top. With Sakin Ol!, she made her position solid in the market, and brought a breath of fresh air to Turkish pop music. Within 25 days of its release, it sold 300,000 copies. The number later rose to 750,000 copies. Alongside "Sakin Ol!", separate music videos were released for the songs "Aldırma Deli Gönlüm", "Ateşle Barut", "Vurulduk", "Oyun Bitti", "O, Ye" and "Suçluyum". In December 1992, Erener performed at TRT 1 and Kanal 6's New Year programs.

On 13 March 1993, she gave a concert during the national selection in Turkey to choose the artist for the Eurovision Song Contest 1993. In June, Hey Girl magazine named her the Promising Singer of the Year. In July, she performed at Rumelihisarı. In 1993 and 1994, she went to the US and underwent three surgeries for ulcerative colitis from which she had been suffering since the age of 11. She later described her illness with these words: "There was a wound in my bowel which didn't heal for years. Hospitals, diets, resting, beds... I used to go to the bathroom 35 times a day. My intestines could not hold anything." All of her large intestine was taken out during the surgery and, as a result, she had to walk with a bag in her hand for a year. She began to question her own existence as she thought she was going to die from the disease, and in her head she started asking questions such as "Why am I here? Why me?". Thus, she started studying philosophy books and began meditation.

In between her surgeries Erener began preparations for her second studio album Lâ'l, which was released on 14 October 1994. Most of the songs in the album were written by Sezen Aksu and it sold 640,000 copies. The album's lead single was prepared for the documentary 12 Mart: İhtilalin Pençesinde Demokrasi and dedicated to Deniz Gezmiş. It was later included in Sony Music's Sony Music 100 Years: Soundtrack for a Century millennium set. Sertab Erener shot music videos for the songs "Sevdam Ağlıyor" and "Rüya" from this album. Sezen Aksu wrote the song "Rüya", inspired by Erener's illness and the sufferings that she endured following her surgeries. To promote Lâ'l, Erener gave a concert at the Bostancı Show Center, during which she performed "Der Hölle Rache" from Mozart's The Magic Flute. Later, she said that she wanted to turn opera into a popular genre among the people. In March 1995, she won the Best Female Artist award at the 1st Kral TV Video Music Awards. In April, she performed at the Miss Turkey competition. In September, she joined the campaign "We Go To the East with 1000 Artists", which was organized by Ministry of Culture and Tourism, and gave concerts in Eastern parts of Turkey.

In 1996, Kim magazine ranked Erener 6th on its list of the Frumpish Dressed Women. On 18 June 1996, Erener and her husband Levent Yüksel divorced. The couple later said that the reason behind their divorce was that "Our 13-year love turned into sibling or parental feelings. We decided to obtain a divorce because we thought that marriage wouldn't work out without love." In the same year, Erener voiced the character of Esmeralda in the Turkish version of The Hunchback of Notre Dame. She also started working with Mezarkabul's guitarist Demir Demirkan. At the end of the year, preparations for her third studio album began. For the first time, she included songs that were written by herself in the album. She later talked about how she started songwriting: "I've tried to tell you what I live and feel as well as I can. Even if I didn't write it myself, I gave it to other songwriters to turn it into lyrics. I just acted as a commentator in my previous albums. This time, I work as a composer and songwriter." For her third studio album Erener signed a $100,000 contract with Sony Music and released Sertab Gibi in February 1997 under the labels of İmaj and Sony. Demir Demirkan also worked on the album. Hürriyet's Lale Barçın İmer wrote that with Sertab Gibi Erener had taken an important step in her career. The songs "Aslolan Aşktır", "Seyrüsefer", "İncelikler Yüzünden", "Aaa" and "Yara" were turned into music videos and Sertab Gibi sold 147,000 copies by August 1997.

Sertab Erener later joined the campaign "Come on Southeast", and gave a concert on 26 August 1996 as a part of "Southeast Education Mobilization Concerts". In the same month, it was reported that Melih Ayraçman of Sony Music Turkey was planning on introducing Sertab Erener to the European audience with new projects. In December, Erener assisted Our Children with Leukemia Foundation and joined José Carreras in performing at a fundraising concert for the foundation. Alongside her own music projects, she taught music at the Müjdat Gezen Art Center for one year.

=== 1999–2004: Sertab Erener, Turuncu, Eurovision and No Boundaries ===
Sony and Columbia released Erener's self-titled album in March 1999, which included works such as the poem "Makber" by Abdülhak Hâmid Tarhan and Mozart's "Der Hölle Rache". The album rose to the top of D&R's List of Best-Selling Albums in Turkey and sold 427,000 copies. "Yanarım", "Zor Kadın", "Vur Yüreğim" and "Yolun Başında" were the songs from Sertab Erener that were turned into music videos. "Vur Yüreğim" won the Best Lyrics award at the Kral TV Video Music Awards. "Zor Kadın" also became a number-one hit and was played on radios regularly. It was later re-released as a duet with Voice Male. In the same year Erener was featured on the song "Private Emotion" by Ricky Martin. Erener was scheduled to perform at Efes Pilsen's 13th establishment anniversary on 16 August, which was set to be followed by a tour inside Turkey, but the concert was cancelled due to the 1999 İzmit earthquake. In September she continued her tour and donated her proceeds from the concerts to the earthquake survivors. In accordance with her plans, in 2000 she released the compilation album Sertab and gave a number of concerts in Europe. In April, for the National Sovereignty and Children's Day, she gave a concert at Ephesus in front of 20,000 people. To make herself more known in Europe, she released the EP "Bu Yaz" in July. Greek singer Mando was featured on the Turkish-Greek song "Aşk / Fos", which was included in the EP. Hürriyet wrote that with this duet Erener successfully earned a reputation in Greece.

In May 2001, Erener's fifth studio album Turuncu was released. She later talked about her name choice for the album: "Turuncu [Orange] represents positive energy besides being a color. My album also carries a cheerful, warm, positive energy. I made this album trying to link people to life. Because I had major health problems, even in times of sadness, I always preferred to stay positive." The album ranked number-one on D&R's List of Best-Selling Albums and sold 260,000 copies. The songs "Kumsalda" and "Söz Bitti" from Turuncu were later turned into music videos. In December, Erener won the Best Turkish Pop Music Female Soloist award at the Golden Butterfly Awards, and her new single "Kendime Yeni Bir Ben Lazım" was published.

In January 2003, TRT announced that Erener would represent Turkey at the Eurovision Song Contest 2003. In February the name of the song was announced as "Everyway That I Can" and it was stated that the lyrics were in English. Turkish Language Association called for using a Turkish song instead to properly represent Turkish culture. Erener responded to the criticism by saying: "It has to be in English to comply with world standards. Half of the world listens to English music, why should they not listen to a Turkish artist who sings in English? [...] People do not understand Turkish. If we find it difficult [to sing a suitable song] in our own language, why should we? When TRT asked me to write a song, I gave them my conditions. I said, 'I want to sing the song in English'." The song was released on 8 March, and on 24 May in Riga, it earned 167 points earning Turkey its first victory in the contest and making it the host for the 2004 competition. "Everyway That I Can" entered the music charts of many European countries. In Sweden and Greece, it topped the official lists. Due to the song's commercial success in these two countries, it received a gold and platinum certification from the two of them respectively.

After returning to Turkey, Erener received various awards due to her victory in Eurovision. She met with President Ahmet Necdet Sezer and Prime Minister Recep Tayyip Erdoğan, and a reception was organized to celebrate her victory. She was also given the State Medal of Distinguished Service. She also received two Honorary Awards at the 1st MÜ-YAP Music Awards and 10th Kral TV Video Music Awards. She later performed Bob Dylan's song "One More Cup of Coffee" for the film Masked and Anonymous which was released in July 2003. In August, she played in one of the films prepared by UNICEF and Ministry of National Education for the campaign "Come On Girls! Let's Go To School". Sertab was re-released in Europe with new additions and sold 500,000 copies as of August 2003. On 26 September, she performed with a number of artists at the Royal Albert Hall in a fundraising event to help Iraqi children with leukemia.

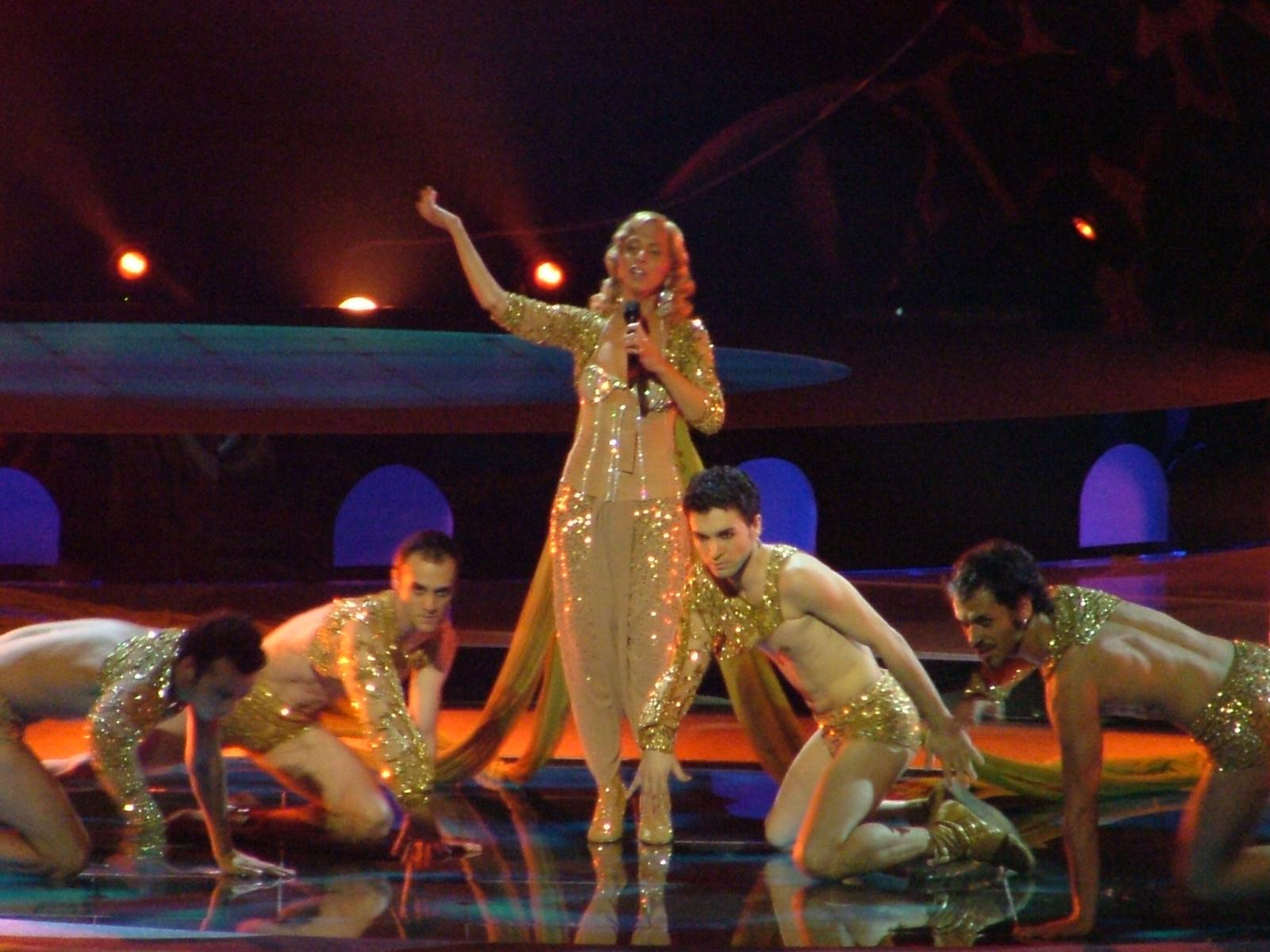
Erener opening the Eurovision Song Contest 2004, Istanbul

In January 2004, Erener's first English studio album No Boundaries was released in Europe. The album ranked number-one on Turkey's List of Best-Selling Albums, and was followed by the singles "Here I Am", "Leave" and "I Believe (That I See Love in You)". Out of these songs, "Here I Am" was used in the teasers for the movie A Tale of Two Sisters. In March, Erener's house was robbed and ₺15,000 of her properties were stolen. On 15 May, she opened the Eurovision Song Contest 2004 by performing the songs "Everyway That I Can" and "Leave". Despite the debate over the format of the ceremony, Erener used sama dancers for her performance. In the same year, due to the emergence of problems "in terms of singer-company relationship", she ended her contract with Sony Music and together with Demir Demirkan found the label Simya Müzik.

=== 2005–2009: Aşk Ölmez and Painted on Water ===
In January 2005, Erener performed at a fundraising concert for people who lost their homes at the 2004 Indian Ocean earthquake and tsunami. The proceeds from this concert, which were estimated to be around ₺126,000, were used to provide medical aid for the injured. Erener herself took the proceeds to Sri Lanka in February and described the experience as "the biggest disaster I've seen since the day I was born". In May, after eight months of preparations, her seventh studio album Aşk Ölmez was released by the label Simya Müzik. It topped D&R's List of Best-Selling Albums and sold 160,000 copies, with the songs "Aşk Ölmez, Biz Ölürüz", "Satılık Kalpler Şehri" and "Kim Haklıysa" turned into music videos. Music critics found the album intimate and unpretentious. In August, Erener performed the Independence March at the Turkish Grand Prix. In October, she performed at the Congratulations: 50 Years of the Eurovision Song Contest to commemorate the Eurovision Song Contest's fiftieth anniversary. Her song "Everyway That I Can" was determined to be the Contest's ninth most popular entrant of its fifty years. In the same year, the Ministry of Education of the Republic of Turkey, released the textbook "They succeeded" for the fourth grade social studies and Erener was named in the book as the person who "won the first place for our country at the Eurovision contest for the first time".

In May 2006, Sertab Erener's outfit for Eurovision was sold at an auction for ₺4,500. The proceeds were donated to the campaign "Daddy Take Me To School". In the same month, Erener performed the song "Çocuklar Gibi" for Ali Kocatepe's tribute album 41 Kere Maşallah. In June, she won the Best Pop Artist award at the Kemal Sunal Culture and Arts Awards. Later that month she went on stage at the 4th International Turkish Olympics and performed "Güneş Gibi Doğuyor Türkçe". In December, Erener went to Azerbaijan to perform at a concert, but pianist Burak Bedikyan from the orchestra, who was a Turkish citizen of Armenian descent, was kept in the airport and eventually deported to Turkey, urging Turkey to send a warning note to Azerbaijan.

In January 2007, it was announced that Erener would perform at a jazz concert on 1 February 2007, but the event was cancelled as she fell ill with pneumonia. She performed at the next concert on 18 February together with Sabri Tuluğ Tırpan Later they voiced the song "Sen Ağlama" for Onno Tunç's tribute album Onno Tunç Şarkıları, which was released in May. In April, she released the album The Best of Sertab Erener - En İyiler, which contained her greatest hits. Alongside her own songs, Isolina Carrillo's "Dos Gardenias" which she performed for the movie When Luck Breaks the Door (2005) and Madonna's "Music" which she performed for the documentary Crossing the Bridge: The Sound of Istanbul (2005) were also included in the album. In May, her first remix album Sertab Goes to the Club was released. In July, she released the single "I Remember Now" as a part of project DRUM, which aimed to increase tolerance and respect among different cultures. In September, to celebrate her 15th year of career, she gave a concert at Cemil Topuzlu Open-Air Theater together with Sezen Aksu, Levent Yüksel, Nil Karaibrahimgil, Fahir Atakoğlu, Özge Fışkın and Demir Demirkan. The concert included three parts "Death and Life", "Rebirth" and "Love", during which she told her own life's story in songs. In "Death and Life", she performed songs in relation to how she dealt with ulcerative colitis, followed by "Rebirth", which focused on the part of her life during which she got rid of her disease and took advantage of her life by rising to fame. In the final part, "Love", she displayed how she found happiness thanks to Demir Demirkan's love. In December 2008, footage of her concert were released in the live album Sertab Erener Otobiyografi: 15. Sanat Yılı Konseri. Hürriyet's Onur Baştürk named the album the best work of 2008 praising how she told "her life's story in songs and expressed her philosophy".

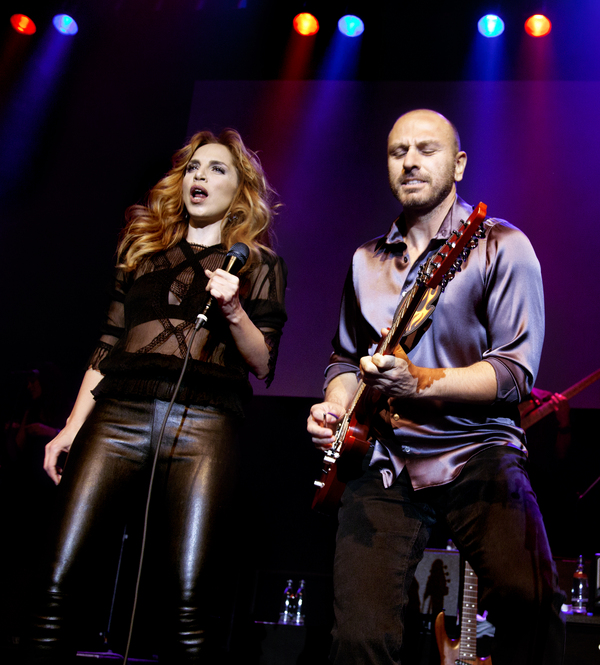
Erener and Demir Demirkan released the album Painted on Water in 2009

In January 2008, Erener and a number of artists took photographs with street animals. These photographs were made into a calendar, and the proceeds from selling it were used to make shelters for these animals. In the same year, she played in the commercials for Elidor, for which she performed her song "Hayat Beklemez". In July–August 2008, she went on a tour with Emre Aydın for the Fanta Youth Festival and gave 18 concerts across Turkey. In order to promote Turkey's culture in the Netherlands, she performed at the Turkey Now festival in October. She later performed the song "Bu Gece Son" for Uzay Heparı's tribute album Uzay Heparı - Sonsuza, which was released in December. In 2007-08 she discussed working on a new album, which she later recorded in Los Angeles together with Demir Demirkan and released it in June 2009 under the title Painted on Water. Erener and Demirkan gave their group's name to the album. The two turned a number of türküs into English and released them in the form of jazz. Demirkan described the album as "Anatolian music and jazz and blues mixed with Western instruments". At the end of 2009, Erener played in the commercials for Turkish Derivatives Exchange.

=== 2010–2015: Rengârenk, Ey Şûh-i Sertab and Sade ===
In June 2010, Erener's eighth studio album Rengârenk was released by DMC. The songs "Açık Adres" and "Rengârenk" both were turned into music videos and ranked number-one on Türkçe Top 20. Other songs for which music videos were released included "Bu Böyle", "Koparılan Çiçekler" and "İstanbul", all of which placed second on the music charts. Besides these five songs, separate music videos were also released for the songs "Bir Damla Gözlerimde" and "Bir Çaresi Bulunur". Cansel Elçin appeared alongside Erener in the music video for "Bir Damla Gözlerimde".

"Açık Adres" won the Best Melody award at the Kral TV Video Music Awards. The album became one of the best-selling albums of the year and Erener won the Best Female Pop Artist award at the Kral TV Video Music Awards. In 2010, Erener's name appeared in the textbooks for Contemporary Turkish and World History courses at the fourth grades of high schools. In the book, it was written that Erener's victory in the Eurovision Song Contest was the first major success of Turkish pop music in the international arena.

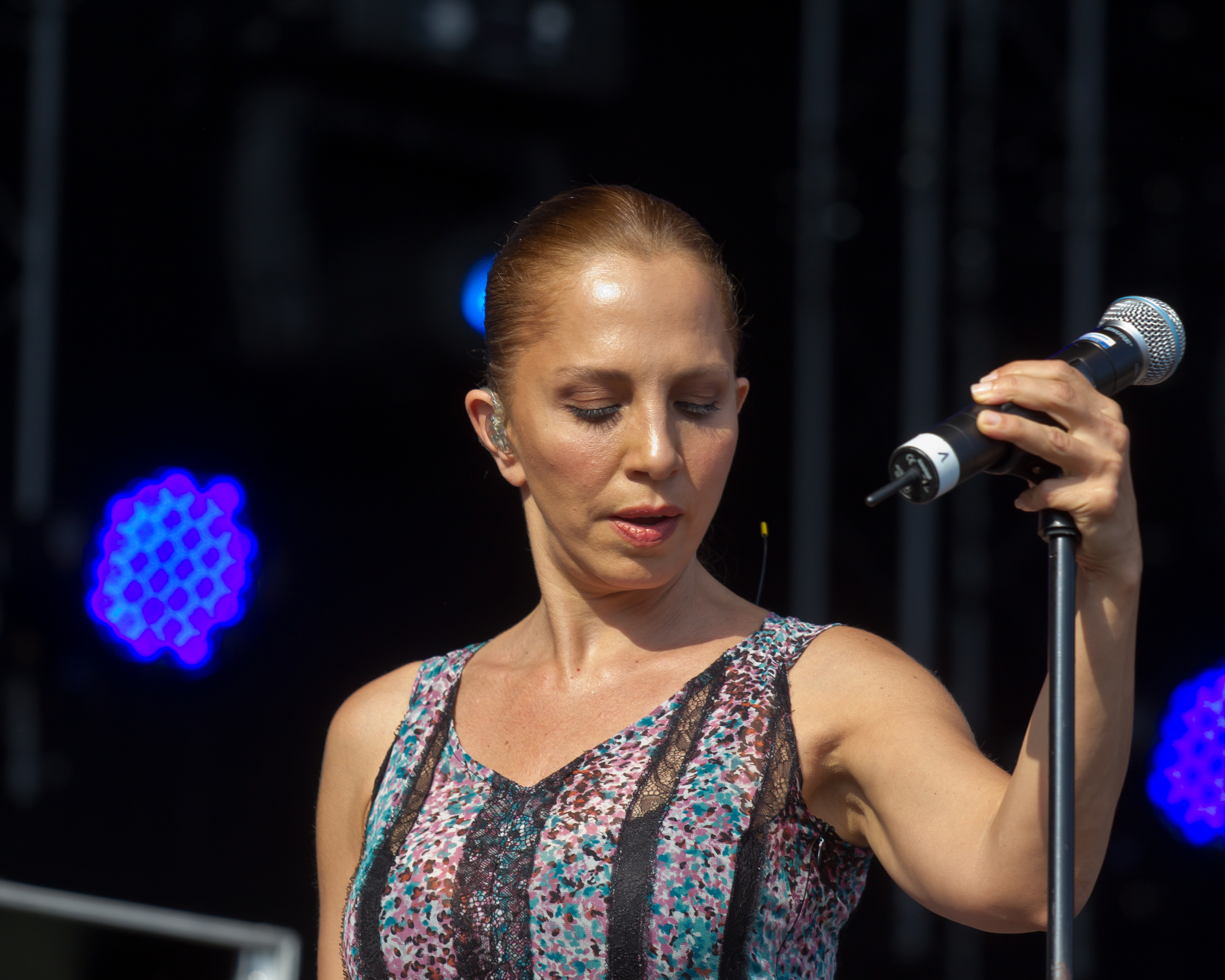
Erener performing in June 2014

In April 2012, she released the classical Turkish album Ey Şûh-i Sertab, which was dedicated to her father Nizamettin Erener, after one year of preparations. Thanks to the album, which included 15 old classical Turkish songs, Erener won the "Best Female Classical Turkish Music Soloist" award at the Golden Butterfly Awards. She later performed the song "Dım Dım" for Ozan Çolakoğlu's first album which was released in June 2012. The music video for the song came out in July 2012. In April 2013, she released her new album, Sade.

In July 2015, Erener married her boyfriend Emre Kula in Seferihisar, İzmir, after 6 months of dating.

=== 2016–present: Kırık Kalpler Albümü and Ben Yaşarım ===
In June 2016, Erener's eleventh studio album Kırık Kalpler Albümü was published by GNL. The album's first music video was made for the song "Kime Diyorum" and directed by Can Saban. The album's production and arrangement was done by Erener's husband Emre Kula.

In 2015, together with her husband guitarist Emre Kula, bassist Eser Ünsalan, keyboardist Ozan Yılmaz and drummer Alpar Lu she found the group Oceans of Noise and they started to make English rock music. In 2017, the group's first EP was released. At the same time, they did the soundtrack for the movie Ayla: The Daughter of War. Beginning in late 2017, Erener started to perform on a musical titled Sertab'ın Müzikali to mark the 25th year of her career. During the musical, which consisted of two separate sections, Erener performed her hit songs from 1990s and 2000s and was accompanied by professional dancers. The preparations for the musical began in 2015 and Beyhan Murphy served as the show's choreographer. The show also continued in 2018 and 2019. Eda Ünsün of Milliyet praised Erener and her band's performance together the show's visuals adding that "a musical spree started in Turkey under the leadership of Erener".

In 2018, Oceans of Noise released their second EP Not Safe. In the same year, Erener released the singles "Bastırın Kızlar" and "Belki de Dönerim" in July and December respectively. The songs were both produced by Emre Kula and written by Can Bonomo.

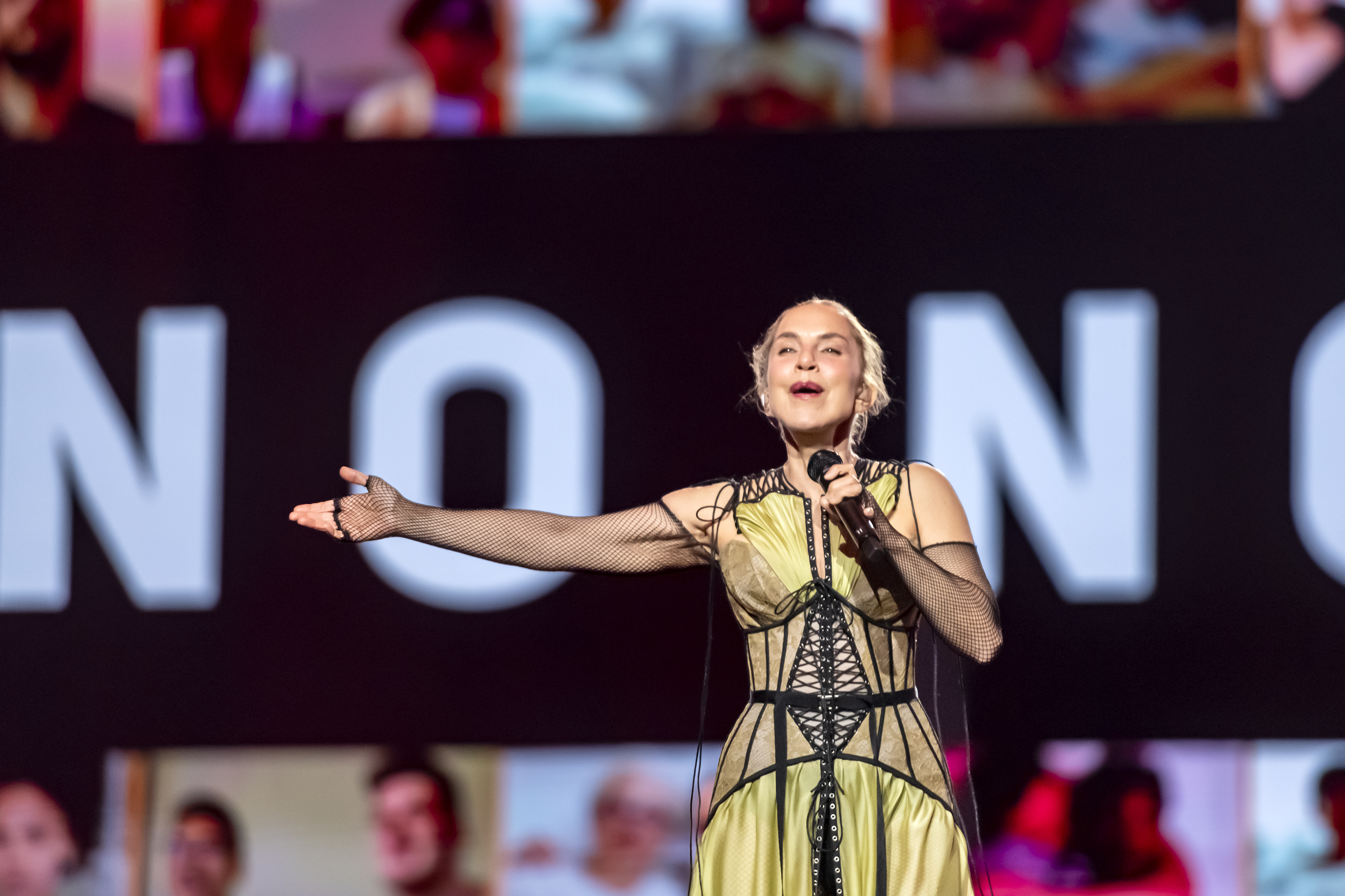
Erener performing in the second semi-final of the Eurovision Song Contest 2024

On 5 June 2020, the song "Bu Dünya" was released as a promotional single for Erener's new studio album. Her twelfth studio album, Ben Yaşarım, was released on 12 June 2020. Musicians such as Emre Kula, Ersel Serdarlı, Doğan Duru, Can Bonomo and Sezen Aksu contributed to this album. Writing for Hürriyet, Hikmet Demirkol praised the songs, mentioning that "Sertab Erener is with us again with a dynamic album, full of detail and depth."

Erener performed "Everyway That I Can" as one of the interval acts in the second semi-final of the Eurovision Song Contest 2024 in Malmö.

== Artistry ==
=== Music style and voice ===
Erener's voice possesses a 3-octave vocal range and is of coloratura soprano type. She is a pop music artist. Her songs are in "a range of Middle Eastern melodies to club songs". In the 1980s, she was involved in opera when she was first introduced to music, but when she couldn't find the success, she was expecting in the opera, she decided to make pop music instead. She later talked about the experience: "It didn't turn out the way I thought or imagined. Maybe it was another [type of] opera that I created within myself. How can I know? There was no such scholarship to go abroad, it didn't exist. Later I said to myself that I'll sing jingle. That way I make money. It's best to do something on my own." She had a lot of difficulties with changing her style from opera to pop music. Semih Günver of Milliyet wrote about Erener in her article in 1994: "What a colorful, sweet voice. This young woman is a great singer. A real soprano performer." Tolga Akyıldız also wrote about her in an article for Hürriyet: "Sertab is one of the first brands of Turkish popular music with the power of both sound and song selection." Before becoming famous she performed in English for years, and as a result, in some parts of her first album Sakin Ol! she sang "things she didn't know the meaning of", and got tired with the efforts to figure out how to say and pronounce some words. In her second album, Lâ'l, she realized this problem and worked on the songs with more interest and stopped dealing with only the technical part of the project. With her third album, Sertab Gibi, she started songwriting and composing. Although she was more focused on the musical aspect of her works, her voice still stood out on the foreground. She later described Sertab Gibi as an experiment and said: "It [the album] might have failed commercially at the time, but in terms of my career I came to the point where everyone said 'Wow, look at this woman!' With this experience, I realized that I have to say what I want through music, and Turkish people's appreciation can be won little by little, and I have to walk with them step by step and make the music. Otherwise, I have the capacity to produce completely avant-garde things, but it is something that only my friends would listen to. Yet I want to appeal to a wider audience. In this case, I believe that pop music is the right language to send the message and go one step further together."

Her fourth album Sertab Erener was found "far from experimental works and more settled" compared to her previous three albums. Her fifth album, Turuncu, was released with the purpose to connect people with life through a positive energy. She also demolished the image she had created with the song "Zor Kadın (Difficult Woman)" in the previous album with "Güle Güle Şekerim (Bye Bye Sweetie)" in the new one. "Everyway That I Can", with which she joined Eurovision in 2003, was decorated with ethnic motifs and was a mixture of classical pop and Turkish music. Her seventh album, Aşk Ölmez, was prepared in a very unpretentious way. With Aşk Ölmez, Erener put aside the idea of "I have to show all the information I've ever had in the first five minutes of the song, and I must reveal my voice there!". She later talked about the album: "It's a little bit fooling around with the idea of love and being human.. I believe there is a philosophy behind it. There are also small jokes, but the album is about women and men and their relationships.... I tried to write about the conflicts that we have in between us, sometimes by taking it as a joke, and sometimes taking it seriously. These are the problems of the majority of people; after all, I don't live anything apart from them. As a person who lives in a big city, I talk about such person's issues. Based on these, I wrote the lyrics of the album." Together with Demir Demirkan, she released the jazz fusion album Painted On Water, which included türküs that were rewritten in English and re-performed. With her eighth album Rengârenk, she put "diva acts aside" and sang in a more calm manner.

=== Influences ===
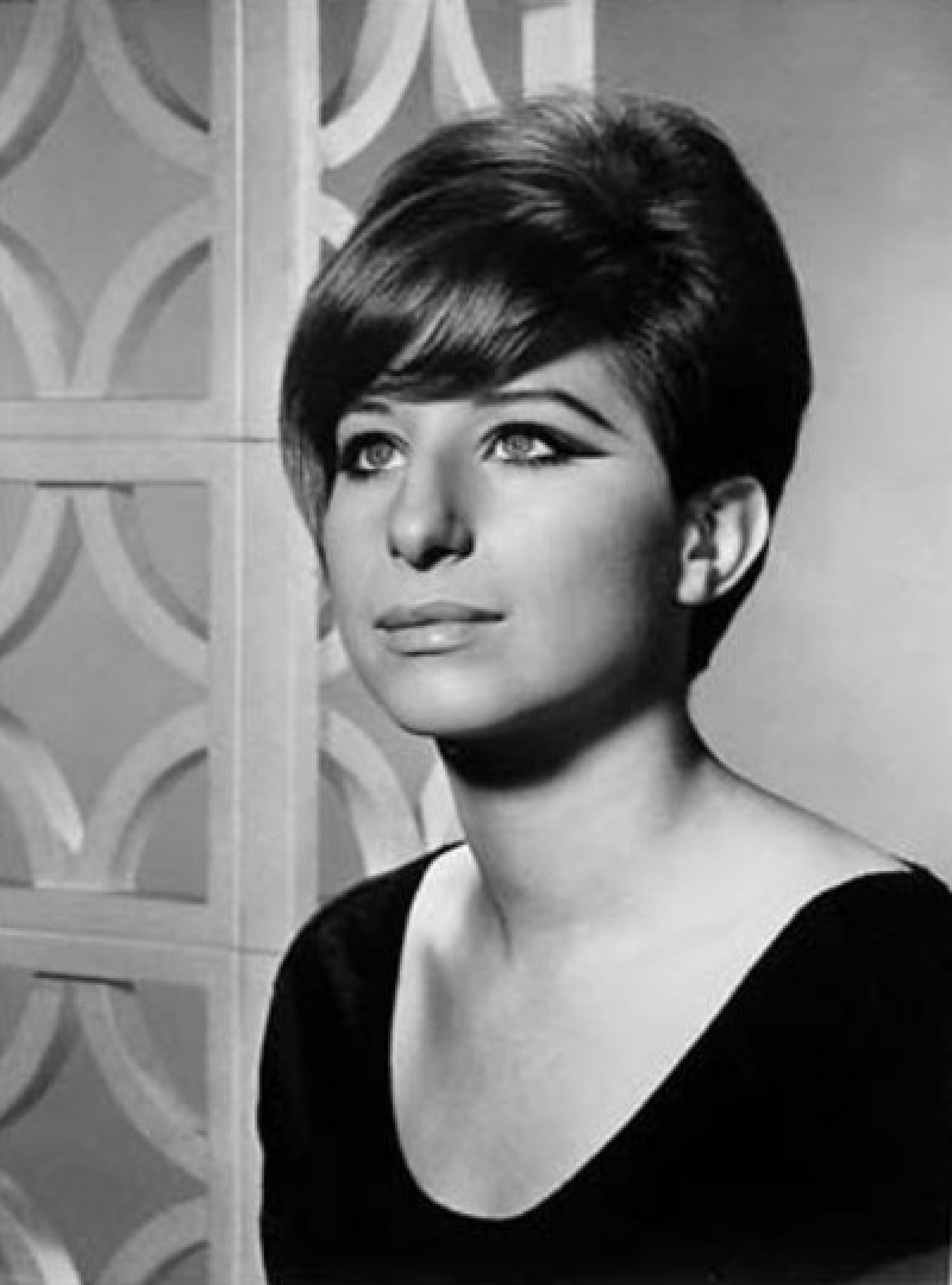
Erener was influenced by Barbra Streisand as she developed her singing style

Erener spent her childhood listening to her father's performances of classical Turkish songs. Alanis Morissette, Sting and Tina Turner were among her favorite artists. Milliyet's Orhan Kahyaoğlu later said that "despite the influence of Sezen Aksu, she was easily stripped from Sezen's music style due to her own refinement and artistic background." Erener said that before Sezen Aksu, she learned a lot during stage performances in terms of communicating with the audience. She has named Barbra Streisand as the "woman of [her] life". She said that she constantly imitated Streisand before becoming famous, saying: "I can't say how I used to imitate her. I've studied this woman a lot, so much. When I decided to sing my own songs, I became aware that it doesn't work like that, with imitation. After that I tried so hard to find the identity of my voice."

== Discography ==
- Sakin Ol! (1992)
- Lâ'l (1994)
- Sertab Gibi (1997)
- Sertab Erener (1999)
- Turuncu (2001)
- No Boundaries (2004)
- Aşk Ölmez (2005)
- Painted on Water (with Demir Demirkan) (2009)
- Rengârenk (2010)
- Ey Şûh-i Sertab (2012)
- Sade (2013)
- Kırık Kalpler Albümü (2016)
- Ben Yaşarım (2020)
- Her Dem Yeşil (2023)
- Her Dem Akustik (2024)

== Filmography ==
=== Television ===
Year	Program	Role	Notes
2002	Ti Show	Herself	
2011	Star Akademi	Herself	
2014	Yalan Dünya	Herself	Episode 76
2014	Arkadaşım Hoşgeldin	Herself	
2015	Sesi Çok Güzel	Herself	
2018	Jet Sosyete	Herself	Episode 26
2020	Jet Sosyete	Herself	Episode 59

== Awards ==
- State Medal of Distinguished Service

Year	Awarding organization	Category
1995	1st Kral TV Video Music Awards	Best Pop Female Artist
2000	6st Kral TV Video Music Awards	Best Pop Female Artist
2000	6st Kral TV Video Music Awards	Best Lyrics (Vur Yüreğim)
2001	28th Golden Butterfly Awards	Best Turkish Pop Music Female Soloist
2002	8th Kral TV Video Music Awards	Best Pop Female Artist
2004	10th Kral TV Video Music Awards	Song of the Year (Everyway That I Can)
2004	10th Kral TV Video Music Awards	Honorary Award
2010	14th Istanbul Fm Golden Awards (IFA)	Best Pop Female Artist
2010	2nd Survey Feast Awards	Most Popular Female Artist
2011	17th Kral TV Video Music Awards	Best Female Artist
2012	39th Golden Butterfly Awards	Best Turkish Art Music Female Soloist
2015	1st Gossip Time Year End Awards	Best Clip & Song with a Message (Kız Leyla)
2017	14th Radio Boğaziçi Music Awards	Best Album (Kırık Kalpler Album)
2021	PowerTürk Music Awards	Most Powerful Album (Ben Yaşarım)
2021	PowerTürk Music Awards	Best Female Singer

Awards and achievements
Preceded by (Latvia) Marie N with "I Wanna"	Winner of the Eurovision Song Contest; 2003	Succeeded by (Ukraine) Ruslana with "Wild Dances"
Preceded by Buket Bengisu & Group Safir with "Leylaklar Soldu Kalbinde"	Turkey in the Eurovision Song Contest; 2003	Succeeded by Athena with "For Real"
