= No Boundaries (Sertab Erener album) =

Studio album by Sertab Erener
- Released: 2004
- Recorded: Decibel Studios, Stockholm
- Genre: Pop, World, Dance-pop, Folk pop, Reggaeton, Turkish pop
- Length: 46:11
- Label: Columbia, Sony
- Producer: Phillipe Laurent, Gilles Luka, Jack D. Elliot, Iskender Paydas

Alternative Cover

No Boundaries is the seventh album from Turkish popstar Sertab Erener. It has been credited with introducing her music to mainland Europe upon its release in 2004, having previously been a huge domestic success in her native country. This album was released in Turkey, Spain, Italy, Germany, Austria, Switzerland, Sweden, Belgium, Netherlands, Greece, Poland, Czech Republic, Israel, Russia, Japan and some other countries.

== Background ==
Although not her first album (preceded by Sakin Ol!, Lâ'l, Sertab Gibi, Sertab Erener, Sertab, and Turuncu), No Boundaries was Sertab Erener's first English language album. It was compiled and released by record company Columbia after Erener's Eurovision win in 2003, with the song "Every Way That I Can".

The songs on the album are composed and arranged mainly by Demir Demirkan, although some have co-writing credits for Erener, for example "Storms". "Everyway That I Can" was included on the album, as the original Turkish release rather than the Eurovision edit, although it is licensed now to Turkish radio and Television and the EBU, rather than Sony.

The next single released was "Here I Am", a song not dissimilar to the Eurovision winner, and then "Leave", an operatic song in which Erener travels five octaves to the soprano range. Both were quite large hits in Turkey and Eastern Europe although they could not come close to the mammoth success of "Every Way That I Can." The final single, "I Believe (That I See Love in You)", was written by France-based Indonesian singer Anggun.

The album was given exposure in May 2004 when a medley of "Here I Am", "Leave", and "Everyway That I Can" were performed as the Istanbul Eurovision opening act by Sertab. In June the track "I Believe" was released and it was the final release taken from the album.

Other songs on the album include "Back to the Beach" which was regarded as the album's low point, and "Got Me like Oh", which was later covered in 2006 by American singer Gia Farrell, and was later interpolated by American singer River Black in 2025. The album was very well received by critics otherwise, who admired the Turkish music-pop combination. Sales of the album have been Erener's best figures yet, both in Turkey and outside.

== Track listing ==
1. "Here I Am"
2. "Breathe in Deeper"
3. "Everyway That I Can"
4. "Got Me like Oh"
5. "I Believe" (That I See Love in You)
6. "Leave"
7. "It Takes More"
8. "Back to the Beach"
9. "Storms"
10. "Love Bites"
11. "The One"
12. "Here I Am" [Jason Nevins Radio Remix]

== Chart positions of releases ==
- "No Boundaries (Album)": Turkey No. 1 Greece No. 2
- "Everyway That I Can": June 2003: No. 1 TUR, No. 1 SWE, No. 1 GRE, No. 6 BEL, No. 7 NED, No. 10 AUS, No. 12 GER, No. 17 SUI, No. 35 IRE, No. 75 UK
- "Here I Am": September 2003: No. 1 TUR, No. 6 GRE, No. 41 BEL, No. 58 SWE, No. 64 SUI
