= Ferhan Şensoy =

Turkish actor, playwright and director (1951–2021)

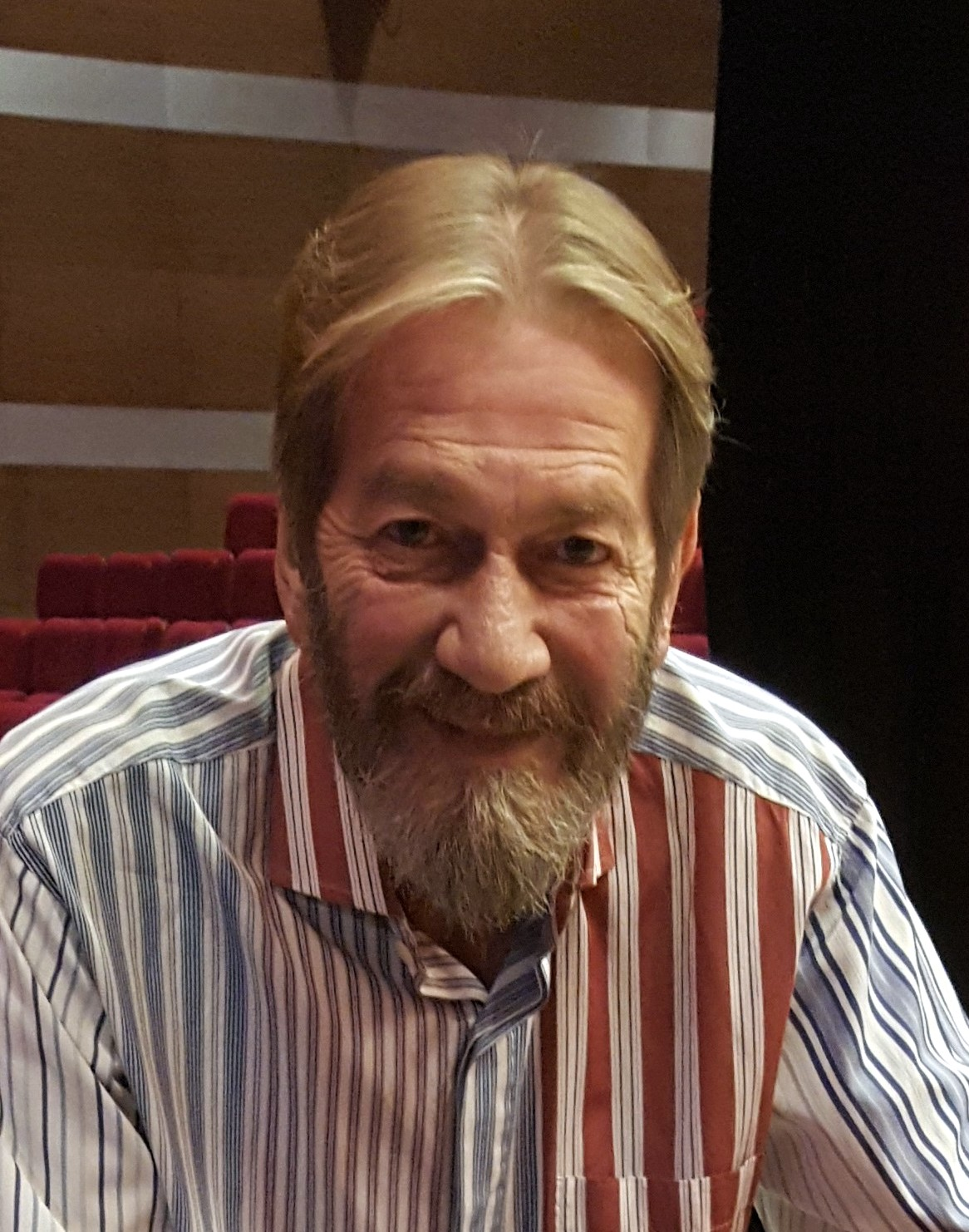
- Born: Osman Ferhan Şensoy; 26 February 1951 Çarşamba, Samsun, Turkey
- Died: 31 August 2021 (aged 70) Istanbul, Turkey
- Resting place: Zincirlikuyu Cemetery
- Occupation: Playwright, actor
- Genre: Black comedy
- Spouse: Derya Baykal (m. 1988; div. 2004) Elif Durdu (m. 2014)
- Children: 2

Osman Ferhan Şensoy (26 February 1951 – 31 August 2021) was a Turkish actor, playwright and director.

== Private life ==
Şensoy was born in the Çarşamba district of Samsun Province in northern Turkey on 26 February 1951.

In 1988, he married stage and film actress Derya Baykal (born 1957). From this marriage, two daughters, Müjgan Ferhan and Derya, were born. The couple divorced in 2004. He made his second marriage secretly in 2014 with stage actress Elif Durdu (born 1977), who acted with Şensoy in the play “Beni Ben mi Delirttim? (literally "Did I Drive Me Crazy?") in 2003.

== Career ==
He experienced his first professional acting with "Grup Oyuncuları" in 1971. Between 1972 and 1975, he studied Theatre in education in France and Canada. He worked under Jérôme Savary and Andre-Louis Périnetti. He was awarded the title "Best Foreigner Playwright" in Montreal, Canada in 1975 for his play Ce Fou de Gogol. He directed and played in the musical Harem qui rit at Théâtre des Quatre Sous in Montreal.

In 1975, Şensoy returned Turkey, and joined the "Nisa Serezli-Tolga Aşkıner Theatre" as an actor. He wrote several Sketch comedies for the Turkish Radio and Television Corporation and the "Cabaret Theatre Devekuşu" in 1976. He staged his cabaret Dedikodu Şov ("Gossip Show") at night club "Stardust" that was played by Adile Naşit, Perran Kutman, Pakize Suda, Sevda Karaca and with music by İstanbul Gelişim Orchestra. At the same night club, he played in the cabaret Kukla ve Kuklacı ("The Pupet and the Pupeteer"), written by Arda Uskan and music composed by Fuat Güner.

In 1978, his first novel Kazancı Yokuşu was published. He authored his first screenplay for the film Kızını Dövmeyen Dizini Döver (literally "He Who Doesn't Beat His Daughter Beats His Knee"). In the same year, he founded the theatre company "Anyamanya" with Mete İnselel. He directed and played in his own play İdi Amin Avantadan Lavanta.

== Theatre fire ==
On 9 February 1987, the theatre building, in which Ferhan Şensoy staged the musical play Muzır Müzikal (literally "Mischievous Musical"), burnt down completely caused "officially" by short circuit fault. The play featured ironic criticisms of the fundamentalist segment in Turkey.

The structure next to the Surp Agop Armenian Hospital at Elmadağ, Şişli in Istanbul was constructed mid 1950 upon the initiative of film producer Turgut Demirağ (1921–1987) and owned by the Hospital Foundation. Named "Theatre Şan", it had a large foyer, a hall with magnificent acoustic, luxurious lodges and a big stage measuring 22 m × 16 m (72 ft × 52 ft). The venue was used as a movie theatre and a music hall for concerts in the past.

In a television show in 2001, Şensoy alleged that the fire was set by religious fanatic police officers, who were assigned to protect him.

== Master of comedy ==
Kel Hasan Efendi (1874-1925 or 1929), a master actor of comedy in the Turkish theatre during the final years of the Ottoman era, was nicknamed "Hasan the Bald", and wore a headgear, a quilted turban (Turkish: kavuk), on the stage. He played a character similar to "Kavuklu" (literally "the one wearing quilted turban") of the theatre in the round (Turkish: orta oyunu) at the end of the 1800s. After retirement, he handed over his "kavuk" to İsmail Hakkı Dümbüllü (1897-1973) as a symbol of the mastery of the traditional improvisational theatre (Turkish: tuluat) and theatre in the round. The "kavuk" was handed over to Münir Özkul (1925-2018) in 1968, a master of comedy in the cinema of Turkey. Ferhan Şensoy received the "kavuk" in 1989, and wore it 27 years long until March 2016, when he passed it over to Rasim Öztekin (1959–2021).

In the words of Münir Özkul, the "kavuk" is a symbol of 600 years of a culture, an art of performance called "tuluat" (improvisation).

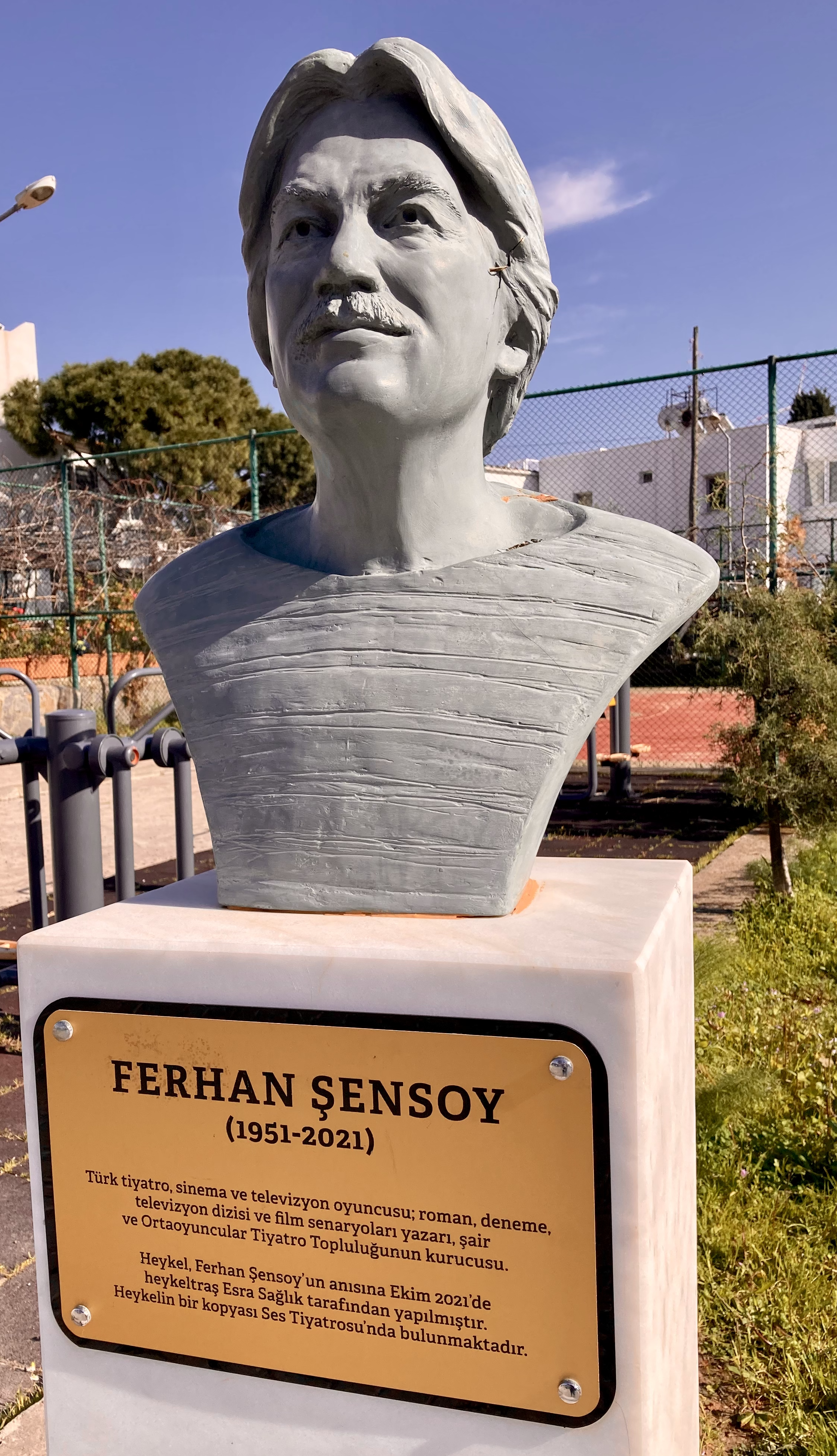
Şensoy's bust in Geriş.

== Health issues and death ==
On 2 July 2021, Ferhan Şensoy was hospitalized due to internal bleeding. Some time ago, he had undergone an angioplasty surgery due to health problems. He was taken to hospital due to the complication that developed due following the surgery. After his treatment there, he was transferred to a private hospital for precautionary purposes.

Şensoy died in the Medical Faculty Hospital of Istanbul University on 31 August 2021. He was interred at the Zincirlikuyu Cemetery after the memorial ceremonies held at Galatasaray High School and the Theatre Ses in Beyoğlu as well as the religious service at Teşvikiye Mosque on 2 September.

== Works ==
=== Plays ===
- Aşkımızın Son Durağı (The Last Stop of Our Love), premiered on 11 March 2006
- Kiralık Oyun (Play For Rent), premiered in 2005
- Uzun Donlu Kişot (Quixote, the Long Underpants), premiered on 31 March 2004, staged also in 2005
- Beni Ben Mi Delirttim (Have I Crazed Myself), premiered on 24 October 2003
- Fişne Pahçesu (Cherry Orchard), a parody-adaptation of Anton Chekhov's play.
- Felek Bir Gün Salakken (One Day When Fate Was Foolish)
- Ferhangi Şeyler (Ferhanish Things)
- Güle Güle Godot (Bye Bye Godot)
- Şahları da Vururlar (They Shoot Shahs As Well)
- İçinden Tramvay Geçen Şarkı (The Song Through Which a Streetcar Passes)
- Seyircili Seyir Defteri (The Logbook with an Audience)
- Kahraman Bakkal Süpermarkete Karşı (Heroic Grocer Versus the Supermarket)
- Soyut Padişah (Abstract Padishah)
- Üç Kurşunluk Opera (The Threebullet Opera), a pardody-adaptation of Bertolt Brecht's play.
- İstanbul'u Satıyorum (I'm Selling Istanbul)
- 40AMbar Gece Tiyatrosu (Kırkambar Night Theatre)
- Aptallara Güzel Gelen Televizyon Dizileri (The Television Shows Stupid People Like)
- Parasız Yaşamak Pahalı (It's Expensive to Live Without Money)
- Çok Tuhaf Soruşturma (A Very Bizzare Investigation)
- Yorgun Matador (The Tired Matador)
- Köhne Bizans Operası (Outdated Byzantine Opera)

=== Films ===
- Muhalif Başkan (2013), actor
- Son Ders: Aşk ve Üniversite (2008), actor
- Pardon (2005), screenplay and actor
- Şans Kapıyı Kırınca (2004), actor
- Büyük Yalnızlık (1989), actor
- Bir Bilen (1986), actor
- Parasız Yaşamak Pahalı (1986), actor
- Köşedönücü (1985), actor
- Kızını Dövmeyen Dizini Döver (1977), actor
- Aşk Dediğin Laf Değildir (1976), actor

=== Television ===
- Varsayalım İsmail
- Boşgezen ve Kalfası

=== Published works ===
- Başkaldıran Kurşunkalem
- Seçme Sapan Şeyler
- Karagöz ile Boşverinbeni
- Elveda SSK
- Hacı Komünist
- Eşeğin Fikri
- Rum Memet
- FerhAntoloji
- Kalemimin Sapını Gülle Donattım
- Falınızda Ronesans Var
- Oteller Kitabı
- Denememeler
- İngilizce Bilmeden Hepinizi I Love You
- Güle Güle Godot
- Düş Bükü
- Ayna Merdiven
- Kazancı Yokuşu
- Gündeste
- Afitap'ın kocası İstanbul
- Şahları da Vururlar

=== Projects ===
- Nuh2
