= Anand Dabak =

American electrical engineer

Anand Dabak is an electrical engineer with Texas Instruments. He got his bachelor in 1987 at the Indian Institute of Technology, Bombay, and afterwards got a masters degree and a doctorate at the Rice University in 1992. He was named a Fellow of the Institute of Electrical and Electronics Engineers (IEEE) in 2014 for his contributions to wireless and power-line communications.
