= Asuman Dabak =

Turkish actress (born 1970)

- Born: 1 February 1970 (age 56); Akhisar, Manisa, Turkey
- Occupation: Actress
- Years active: 1990–present
- Spouse: Ümit Birsel (m. 2005; div. 2014)
- Children: 1

Asuman Dabak (born 1 February 1970) is a Turkish actress.

== Selected filmography ==
Film
Year	Title	Role	Notes
2010	Paper		
2007	Adam and the Devil		
2005	When Luck Breaks the Door		
