= Rasim Öztekin =

Turkish actor (1959–2021)

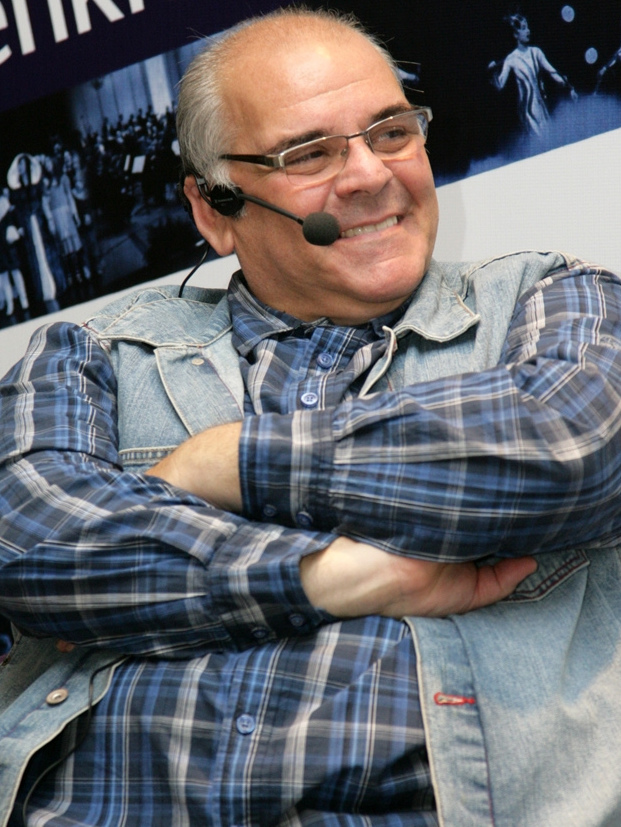
- Rasim Öztekin in 2012
- Born: 14 January 1959; Istanbul, Turkey
- Died: 8 March 2021 (aged 62); Istanbul, Turkey
- Resting place: Zincirlikuyu Cemetery
- Occupation: Actor
- Years active: 1977–2021
- Spouse: Esra Kazancıbaşı (m. 2005)
- Children: 1 (b. 1987)
- Website: rasimoztekin.com.tr

Rasim Öztekin (Turkish pronunciation: [ɾa'sim 'œz'tecin]) (14 January 1959 – 8 March 2021) was a Turkish actor. He appeared in more than forty films since 1985.

== Death ==
Öztekin died of a heart attack on 8 March 2021 in Istanbul at the age of 62. He was buried at Zincirlikuyu Cemetery.

== Selected filmography ==
Year	Title	Role	Notes
2004	G.O.R.A.	Bob Marley Faruk	
2005	Pardon		
2005	When Luck Breaks the Door		
2007	For Love and Honor		
2010	One Day in the Future	Canal	
2013	Düğün Dernek		
