= Pardon (film) =

- Directed by: Mert Baykal
- Written by: Ferhan Şensoy
- Starring: Ferhan Şensoy; İbrahim Rasim; Ali Çatalbaş
- Release date: March 4, 2005
- Running time: 94 minutes
- Country: Turkey
- Language: Turkish

Pardon is a 2005 Turkish comedy film.

== Plot ==
İbrahim goes to Istanbul and has planned to spend the night at his friend Muzaffer's. However, İbrahim, afraid for no apparent reason, runs away from the police at the bus stop. He is eventually caught at Muzaffer's house and they both are taken to jail. The answers they give during their interrogatory leads to having their friend Aydın, who runs a buffet in the district of Taksim, also being detained. Under torture Aydın accepts to state that all the false accusations that are made by the police are true.

== Production ==
Some sequences of the film were shot in Sinop Fortress Prison.

== Cast ==
- Ferhan Şensoy - İbrahim
- Rasim Öztekin - Muzo(Muzaffer)
- Ali Çatalbaş - Aydın Diktepe
- Erol Günaydın - İbrahim'in babası
- Sermiyan Midyat - İbrahim'in Eniştesi
- Parkan Özturan - Gardiyan Osman
- Hakan Bilgin - Taksi Şoförü
- Zeki Alasya - Hapishane müdürü
- Bülent Kayabaş - Emniyet Amiri
