= Everyway That I Can =

2003 song by Sertab Erener

Single by Sertab Erener

from the album No Boundaries
- Released: 23 April 2003
- Genre: Pop; dance-pop; ethnopop
- Length: 2:34
- Label: Columbia; Sony
- Composers: Demir Demirkan; Sertab Erener
- Lyricist: Demir Demirkan
- Producer: Ozan Çolakoğlu

Sertab Erener singles chronology
"Yeni" (2001)	"Everyway That I Can" (2003)	"Here I Am" (2003)

Music video
- "Everyway That I Can" on YouTube

Eurovision Song Contest 2003 entry
- Country: Turkey
- Artist: Sertab Erener
- Language: English
- Composers: Demir Demirkan; Sertab Erener
- Lyricist: Demir Demirkan

Finals performance
- Final result: 1st
- Final points: 167

Entry chronology
- ◄ "Leylaklar Soldu Kalbinde" (2002)
- "For Real" (2004) ►

Official performance video
- "Everyway That I Can" on YouTube

"Everyway That I Can" (also spelled as "Every Way That I Can") is a song by Turkish singer Sertab Erener, with music composed by herself and Demir Demirkan, lyrics written by Demirkan, and production and arrangement by Ozan Çolakoğlu. It represented Turkey in the Eurovision Song Contest 2003, held in Riga, winning the contest. It was the first entry from Turkey in the contest that did not feature any Turkish lyrics.

The song went on to achieve commercial success throughout Europe, peaking at number one on singles charts of Greece, Sweden, and Turkey, as well as attaining top-10 peaks in Austria, Flanders, the Netherlands, Romania, and Spain. It continues to be ranked among the best Eurovision entries.

== Background ==
=== Conception ===
"Everyway That I Can" was composed by Sertab Erener and Demir Demirkan with lyrics by Demirkan. Erener recorded it with production and arrangement by Ozan Çolakoğlu, famous for his works with pop idol Tarkan. She recorded two versions of the song, one fully in English, and another with Turkish and English lyrics.

=== Eurovision ===
The Turkish Radio and Television Corporation (TRT) internally selected Erener as its performer for the 48th edition of the Eurovision Song Contest. On 24 February 2003, TRT announced "Everyway That I Can" as the Turkish entry for the contest. Initially the song caused controversy with the Turkish public, considered too racy by some and too pop-oriented by others. Criticism also arose by Erener's decision to perform it fully in English at Eurovision.

A promo video was released with Erener in an Ottoman style castle, its rose gardens, imperial harem (living quarters) and hamam (Ottoman bathhouse). Roses carry a major symbolism throughout the video. Erener is dressed in traditional Turkish styles, and Turkish female dancers are also present.

With its selection of singer and song, Turkey was regarded as having "set out to win" the contest, but Erener was not widely regarded as a front-runner in the lead-up to the event; "Ne Ver', Ne Boysia" by t.A.T.u. for Russia was regarded as a favorite to win.

On 24 May 2003, the Eurovision Song Contest was held in the Skonto Hall in Riga hosted by Latvian Television (LTV) and broadcast live throughout the continent. Erener performed "Everyway That I Can" fourth on the evening, earning critical acclaim and becoming the only entry that received a standing ovation. The song had been slightly arranged to include some high notes and a belly dancing routine was added. Erener sang counter to the rhythm in places and the backing vocals were synthesised with Turkish stringed instruments.

The voting on the night saw Russia, Turkey, and Belgium switch places at the top a number of times before Slovenia eventually gave Turkey the victory by two points; the song received the maximum 12 points from four countries, the second-highest number (following Russia).

=== After Eurovision ===
Erener was hailed in Turkey as a national hero by the public and the press and was congratulated by the President Ahmet Necdet Sezer and Prime Minister Recep Tayyip Erdoğan. She was awarded the State Medal of Distinguished Service, among others. Additionally, this success was celebrated as a step forward in the Turkey–European Union relations.

As the winning broadcaster, the European Broadcasting Union (EBU) gave TRT the responsibility to host the following edition of the Eurovision Song Contest. Erener performed "Everyway That I Can" with male dancers and the same choreography as part of a medley at the Eurovision final in Istanbul on 15 May 2004. The single was also included in her first English album No Boundaries.

The song continues to perform well in rankings of the all-time best Eurovision entries. On 22 October 2005, the song competed in Congratulations: 50 Years of the Eurovision Song Contest as one of the fourteen best ever Eurovision entrants, and finished ninth. Erener herself appeared onstage to perform the final verse of the song. In 2006, it was entered in Die Grand Prix Hitliste, a German version of the above, and beat off stiff competition from "Waterloo" by ABBA and eleven others to finish second. "Wild Dances" by Ruslana the Ukrainian 2004 winning entry, was first.

The song was also included in a compilation album of Erener's national and international hits released in 2007.

On 9 May 2024, Erener performed the song as part of a sing-along interval act in the second semi-final of the 2024 contest held in Malmö, Sweden. (Note: In a medley with "My Number One" by Helena Paparizou and "Take Me to Your Heaven" by Charlotte Perrelli.)

== Charts performance ==
Following its win, "Everyway That I Can" was released throughout Europe and sold well. It reached number one in Turkey, Greece, and Sweden and entered the top 10 in Flanders, the Netherlands, Spain, and Austria while charting within the top 20 in Germany and Switzerland. It received a platinum certification in Greece and a gold certification in Sweden.

Remixes of the song were also released, including a Turkish version, a club remix, and a European dance remix. A live version was brought out and also included on the original single CD, along with two Galleon club remixes. The track was included on the official Eurovision 2003 CD as the original version, however.

=== Weekly charts ===
Chart (2003)	Peak position
Australia (ARIA)	63
Austria (Ö3 Austria Top 40)	10
Belgium (Ultratop 50 Flanders)	6
Belgium (Ultratop 50 Wallonia)	30
Europe (Eurochart Hot 100)	16
Germany (GfK)	12
Greece (IFPI)	1
Hungary (Editors' Choice Top 40)	21
Ireland (IRMA)	35
Netherlands (Dutch Top 40)	7
Netherlands (Single Top 100)	4
Romania (Romanian Top 100)	3
Scottish Singles Sales (Official Charts)	71
Spain (Promusicae)	5
Sweden (Sverigetopplistan)	1
Switzerland (Schweizer Hitparade)	17
Turkey (Turkish Singles Chart)	1
UK Singles (Official Charts)	72

=== Year-end charts ===
Chart (2003)	Position
Belgium (Ultratop 50 Flanders)	39
Germany (Media Control GfK)	80
Netherlands (Dutch Top 40)	73
Netherlands (Single Top 100)	46
Romania (Romanian Top 100)	24
Sweden (Hitlistan)	22
Switzerland (Schweizer Hitparade)	85

== Certifications ==
Region	Certification	Certified units/sales
Greece (IFPI Greece)	Platinum	20,000^{^}
Sweden (GLF)	Gold	15,000^{^}
^{^} Shipments figures based on certification alone.

== Legacy ==
In 2010, Elhaida Dani performed the song live on E diela Shqiptare, an Albanian variety show. Dani would later go on to represent Albania at the Eurovision Song Contest 2015.

== Notes ==
Preceded by "I Wanna" by Marie N	Eurovision Song Contest winners 2003	Succeeded by "Wild Dances" by Ruslana
