= Demir Demirkan =

Turkish musician (born 1972)

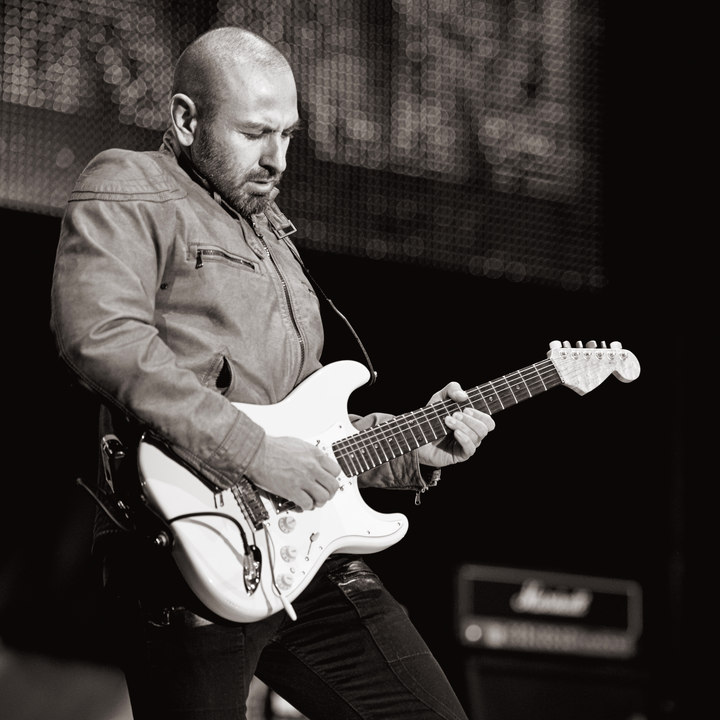

Background information
- Born: 12 August 1972 (age 54); Adana, Turkey
- Genres: Thrash metal Rock; Turkish folk music katajjaq
- Occupations: Musician, songwriter, arranger, Record producer
- Instruments: Vocals, guitar
- Years active: 1990–present
- Label: Motéma Music
- Member of: Pentagram (1990–1992 / 1996–1998 / 2017–...)
- Website: www.demirdemirkan.net

Demir Demirkan (Turkish pronunciation: [deˈmiɾ demiɾˈkan]) (born 12 August 1972) is a Turkish musician, Eurovision Song Contest winning composer, guitarist for thrash metal band Mezarkabul and writer. Demirkan started playing music when he was 13 and played guitar with various groups in college. He also wrote television jingles and composed soundtracks for television and films.

== Early life and influences ==
After Çankaya Primary School and TED Ankara College, he graduated from Çamlaraltı High School in İzmir then graduated from Bilkent University, English Language and Literature. Demirkan started playing music when he was 13 and played guitar with various groups in college. In 1990, Demirkan joined a heavy/rock group, Mezarkabul, based in Istanbul and wrote and played guitar in the group's second album, Trail Blazer.

In 1992, he moved to Los Angeles where he studied with Scott Henderson, Frank Gambale and Paul Hanson who founded the MI-Musician's Institute.

In 1996, he moved back to Istanbul and worked as a producer, guitarist and composer for various artists such as Sebnem Ferah and Sertab Erener. Demirkan rejoined Mezarkabul again in 1997 and recorded the Anatolia album.

== Career ==
Demirkan played his first guitar at age 13, and attained national stardom in 1990 when he joined the Istanbul heavy rock group Mezarkabul as songwriter and guitarist. In 1992, he studied at Musician's Institute in Los Angeles with Scott Henderson, Frank Gambale, and MI founder Paul Hanson, also playing studio and live gigs.

In 2000, Demirkan released his eponymous initial solo album with Sony Music. His albums Dunya Benim (The World is Mine) and 2004 Istanbul followed in 2002 and 2004. The latter sold in 11 European countries after his successful tour with Mike Tramp (Whitelion).

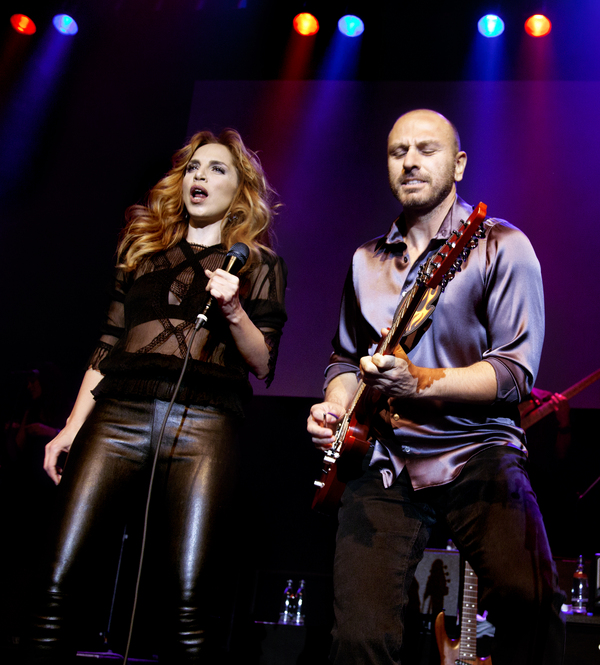
Demirkan performing with Sertab Erener

The songs Demirkan wrote for Sertab Erener were widely accepted in Europe and Turkey. One of these songs, "Everyway That I Can", was the winner of the Eurovision Song Contest 2003.

Demirkan also wrote television jingles and composed soundtracks for television and films. One of the more remarkable works of Demirkan was the music he composed for the documentary about Gallipoli/Gelibolu in 2005. That soundtrack involved ethnical strings recorded in Turkey and classical melodies recorded by a symphonic orchestra and choir in the Czech Republic. It was released in Turkey and Australia.

Demirkan and Sertab Erener embarked on the international project Painted on Water together. This innovative work entitled Ebru was co-produced by Demirkan and Jay Newland, a multi- Grammy-winning-producer (Norah Jones’ “Come Away with Me”), and released on Motéma Music.

His Los Angeles experience informed the current project in several ways, not least the fact that "the L.A. vibe is great for art," Demirkan says. "Every day when I was studying in Hollywood, I passed A&M Studios, and I wanted to record an album there. When we were ready to record Painted on Water, we had to search for them because they'd changed to their name to Hanson. Every time I passed by, I promised myself I’d get there and record, so it was a great moment, a dream came true."

Demirkan continues his solo career in Turkey.

== Albums ==
- Demir Demirkan (2000)
- Dünya Benim (2002)
- 2004 İstanbul (2004)
- Gelibolu (OST) (2005)
- Ateş Yağmurunda Çırılçıplak (2007)
- Yolun Yarısı (2008)
- Painted on Water (with Sertab Erener) (2010)
- Biriz (2011)
- 2000-2012 (2012)
- Tam Ölmek de Değil (2014)
- Elysium on Ashes (2019)

Preceded by Marija Naumova	Eurovision Song Contest winning composer 2003 (with Sertab Erener)	Succeeded by Ruslana Lyzhychko
