= When Luck Breaks the Door =

- Theatrical poster
- Directed by: Tayfun Güneyer
- Written by: Tayfun Güneyer
- Produced by: Vural Öger
- Starring: Ferhan Şensoy; Asuman Dabak; Zeki Alasya; Rasim Öztekin
- Cinematography: Veli Kuzlu
- Edited by: Çagri Türkkan
- Music by: Patrick Chartol; Jean-Michel Vallet; Claire Michael
- Distributed by: Warner Bros. Pictures
- Release date: 28 January 2005
- Running time: 107 minutes
- Countries: Turkey, Cuba
- Languages: Turkish, Spanish

When Luck Breaks the Door (Turkish: Şans Kapıyı Kırınca) is a 2005 Turkish comedy film, written and directed by Tayfun Güneyer, featuring Ferhan Şensoy as a man who takes his family on a holiday to a Caribbean island at the centre of a CIA assassination plot. The film, which went on general release across the country on January 28, 2005, was shown in competition at the 42nd Antalya Golden Orange Film Festival. It was mostly shot on location in Cuba.

== Plot ==
When Kuddusi Yurdum misses the final answer on the TV gameshow "Şans Kapıyı Kırınca", his family is given a consolation prize: a vacation to Barboonia, a fictional "banana republic" island country near Cuba. They are welcomed there by the country's dictator President Carlos, in order to stop an assassination plot by the CIA.

== Cast ==
- Ferhan Şensoy as Kuddusi / Presidente Carlos (Carlos Romário Mustafa Ibrahim Salvador del Puento González Salgado)
- Asuman Dabak as Nermin (Kuddusi's wife)
- Zeki Alasya as Father Alfonso
- İlkay Saran as Lezize (Kuddusi's mother-in-law, Nermin's mother)
- Rasim Öztekin as José Ricardo
- Necmi Yapıcı as Ercan (Kuddusi's brother-in-law, Nermin's brother)
- Fethi Kantarcı as Yaman (Kuddusi's son)
- Alev Gezer as Ebru (Kuddusi's daughter)
- Ayça Tekindor as Princess Maria
- Sinan Çetin as Hotel Bonita Cocierge
- Doğa Rutkay as Air Hostess
- Tamer Karadağlı as the Pilot
- Memet Ali Alabora as Flight Passenger 1
- İpek Tuzcuoğlu as Flight Passenger 2
- Hakan Yılmaz as Presenter (of the TV gameshow)
