= Unspoken =

Unspoken may refer to:

== Film and television ==
- Unspoken, a 2006 film starring William Sadler
- Unspoken (film), a 2008 drama film directed by Fien Troch
- "Unspoken" (CSI: NY), a 2012 episode of crime drama CSI: NY
- The Unspoken (film), a 2015 Canadian horror film

== Music ==
- Unspoken (band), an American Christian band
- Unspoken (Jaci Velasquez album), 2003
- Unspoken (Pentagram album), 2001
- Unspoken (Unspoken album), 2014
- Unspoken (Chris Potter album), 1997
- Unspoken (Cecil McBee album), 1997
- Unspoken, a 2001 album by Mezarkabul
- "Unspoken", a song by Cascada from their 2011 album Original Me
- "Unspoken", a song by Chaos Divine from their 2020 album Legacies
- "Unspoken", a song by Four Tet from the 2003 album Rounds
- "Unspoken", a song by Lacuna Coil from their 2002 album Comalies
- "Unspoken", a song by War of Ages from their 2021 EP Rhema
- "Unspoken", a song by Weezer from their 2010 album Hurley
- "Unspoken", a song by Hurts

== Other uses ==
- The Unspoken, a fantasy multiplayer game by Insomniac Games
- The Unspoken, a Marvel Comics supervillain
- Unspoken (play), a 2005 Australian play by Rebecca Clarke
