= Ford Transit Custom =

Range of light commercial vehicles produced by Ford

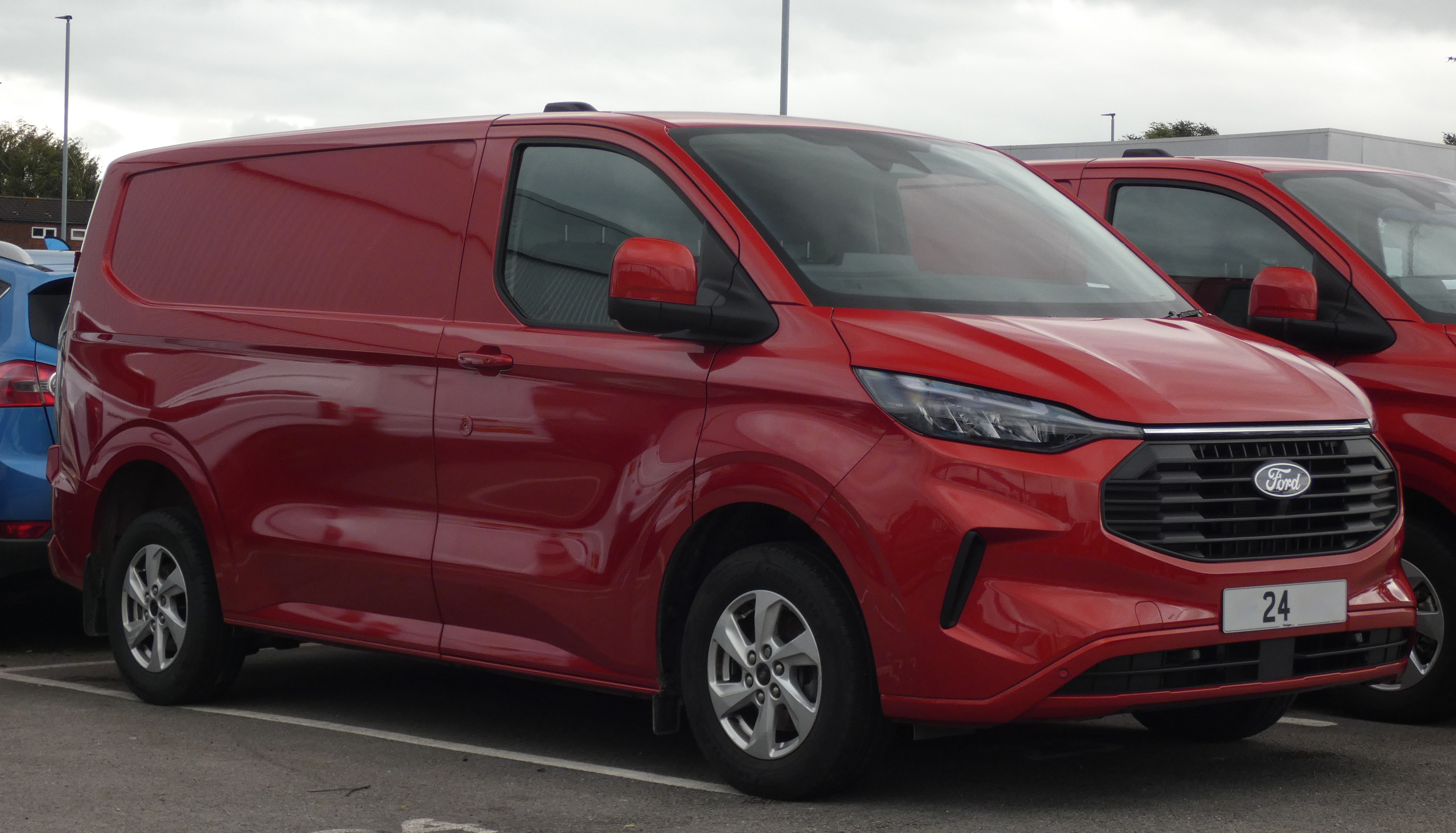

Overview
- Manufacturer: Ford of Europe
- Production: 2012–present

Body and chassis
- Class: Light commercial vehicle (M)
- Layout: Front-engine, front-wheel-drive layout

Chronology
- Predecessor: Ford Transit; Ford Econovan

The Ford Transit Custom is a mid-sized, front wheel drive van produced by Ford Europe since 2012. It marked a split in the Transit range, with the Custom being the smaller version and the Ford Transit being the larger. Similar to other Transit variants, the passenger versions were branded Tourneo Custom.

== First generation (2012) ==
First generation
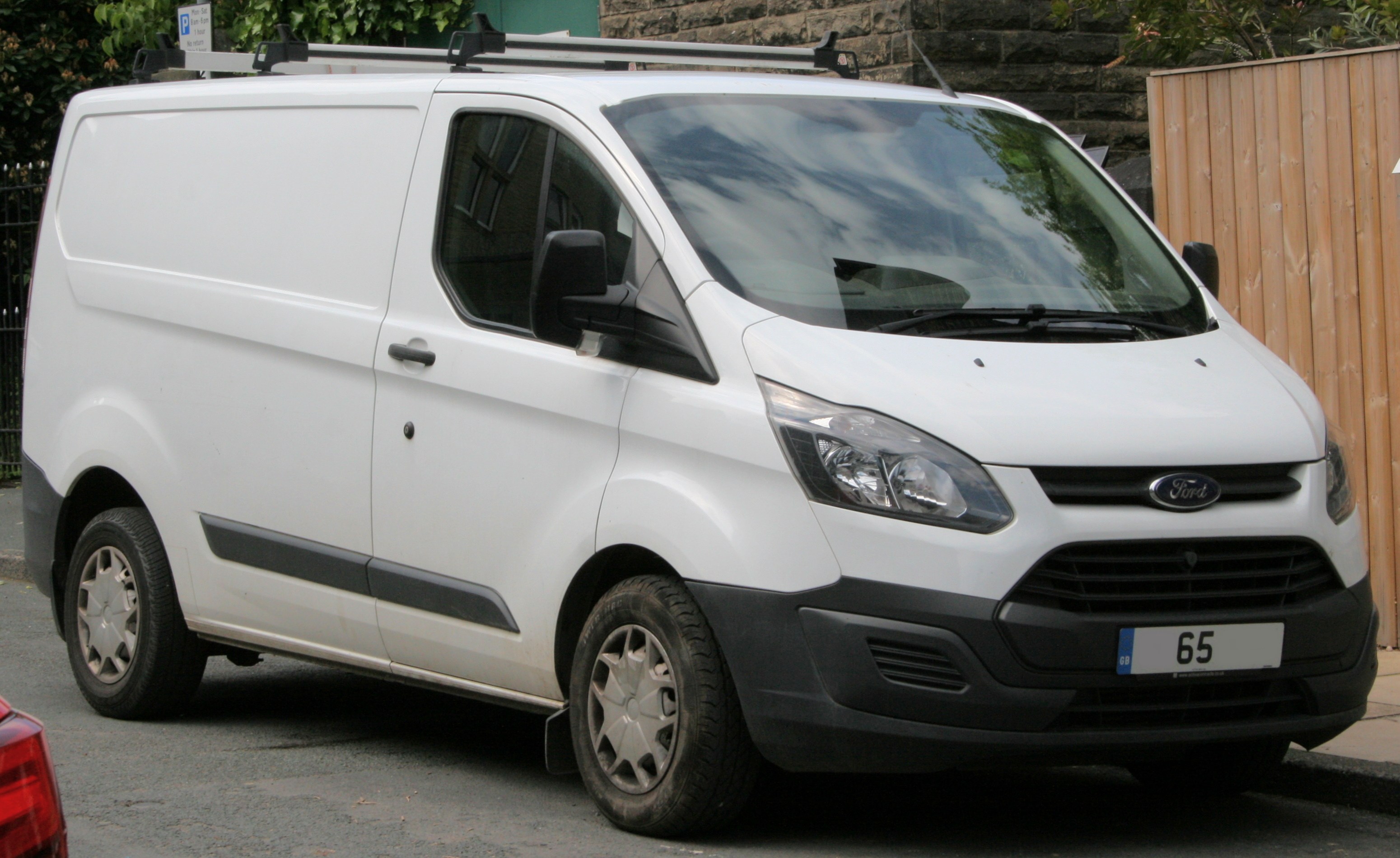

Overview
- Also called: Ford Tourneo Custom; Ford New Transit (China); Ford Tourneo (Vietnam)
- Production: 2012–2023; 2016–present (China); 2019–2021 (Vietnam)
- Assembly: Turkey: Gölcük, Kocaeli (Ford Otosan); China: Nanchang (Jiangling Motors); Vietnam: Hai Duong (Ford Vietnam)
- Designer: Paul Campbell

Body and chassis
- Body style: Van (Transit Custom); Crew cab van (Transit Custom); Minivan/Minibus (Transit Custom Kombi, Tourneo Custom)

Powertrain
- Engine: Petrol: 2.0 L EcoBoost I4 turbo; Petrol PHEV: 1.0 L EcoBoost I3 turbo (PHEV); Diesel: 2.2 L Duratorq I4 turbodiesel (2012-2016); 2.0 L EcoBlue I4 turbodiesel; Diesel Mild Hybrid engines; 2.0 L EcoBlue Hybrid mHEV I4 turbodiesel
- Electric motor: 11.5 kW (15.4 hp) belt-driven integrated starter/generator (BISG) (Transit Custom EcoBlue Hybrid)
- Transmission: 5 speed manual (China); 6-speed manual 6-speed automatic 9 speed automatic (China)
- Hybrid drivetrain: EcoBlue Hybrid mHEV (Transit Custom EcoBlue Hybrid)
- Battery: 48-volt battery pack 13.6 kWh (PHEV)
- Plug-in charging: 2.4 kW AC or Type 2 7.2 kW AC (PHEV)

Dimensions
- Wheelbase: 2,933 mm (115.5 in) (SWB); 3,300 mm (129.9 in) (LWB)
- Length: 4,972 mm (195.7 in) (SWB); 5,339 mm (210.2 in) (LWB)
- Width: 1,986 mm (78.2 in) (ex. mirrors); 2,290 mm (90.2 in) (inc. mirrors)
- Height: 1,922–2,017 mm (75.7–79.4 in) (low roof); 2,280–2,381 mm (89.8–93.7 in) (high roof)
- Kerb weight: 1,786–2,020 kg (3,937–4,453 lb)

The Ford Transit Custom was unveiled at the 2012 Commercial Vehicle Show at the National Exhibition Centre in Birmingham, England. Currently, the Transit Custom is not sold in the United States and Canada, but it is sold in Mexico. It was not sold in China until 2016. An updated version with mild styling changes and a new engine family was introduced in 2017.

=== Powertrains ===
One engine was available between 2012 and 2016, a 2.2-litre inline-four Duratorq turbodiesel, in three power output levels: 74 kW (101 PS; 99 hp) and 310 N⋅m (230 lb⋅ft) of torque, 92 kW (125 PS; 123 hp) and 350 N⋅m (260 lb⋅ft), 113 kW (154 PS; 152 hp) and 385 N⋅m (284 lb⋅ft). It was succeeded in 2017 by a 2.0-litre EcoBlue turbodiesel that was compliant with Euro 6 emissions standards and offered comparable output levels. An ECOnetic package was available for the lowest-output model, which added an automatic engine start-stop system, low rolling resistance tires, and electronic controls to drive consumption and emissions down to 5.7 L/100 km (50 mpg_{‑imp}; 41 mpg_{‑US}) and 148 g/km (8.4 oz/mi) of CO_{2}, respectively.

An optional mild hybrid system was introduced to the EcoBlue engines in 2019. A belt-driven starter/generator replaces the alternator, which is connected to a 48 V, 10 A-hr lithium-ion battery. Mild hybrid vehicles are equipped with a start-stop system that shuts down the engine when the vehicle is stopped or decelerating at less than 12 km/h (7.5 mph), returning energy to the storage battery and providing an improvement in fuel economy of approximately three to eight percent.

Also in 2019, Ford introduced a plug-in hybrid electric vehicle (PHEV) version of the Tourneo, which uses Ford's 1-litre EcoBoost petrol engine and an electric traction motor with a 13,6 kWh battery. The PHEV is a series hybrid where the petrol engine acts as a range extender, as the front wheels of the car are driven by the electric engine. It can go 50 km (31 mi) on electricity, but up to 500 km (310 mi) using the petrol engine. Fuel consumption is reported to be 3.3 L/100 km (71 mpg_{‑US}). This version will be available in the second half of 2019.

Ford Transit Custom powertrain options
Years	Engine	Power	Torque	Fuel	Consumption	CO_{2}
2012–2016	2.2 L Duratorq	74 kW (99 hp)	310 N⋅m (230 lbf⋅ft)	Diesel	6.7–6.5 L/100 km (35–36 mpg_{‑US})	172–177 g/km (9.8–10.0 oz/mi)
2012–2016	2.2 L Duratorq	92 kW (123 hp)	350 N⋅m (260 lbf⋅ft)	Diesel	6.7–6.5 L/100 km (35–36 mpg_{‑US})	172–177 g/km (9.8–10.0 oz/mi)
2012–2016	2.2 L Duratorq	114 kW (153 hp)	385 N⋅m (284 lbf⋅ft)	Diesel	6.7–6.5 L/100 km (35–36 mpg_{‑US})	172–177 g/km (9.8–10.0 oz/mi)
2017–2023	2.0 L EcoBlue	77 kW (103 hp)	360 N⋅m (270 lbf⋅ft)	Diesel & Diesel hybrid	7.7–7.1 L/100 km (31–33 mpg_{‑US})	186–204 g/km (10.6–11.6 oz/mi)
2017–2023	2.0 L EcoBlue	96 kW (129 hp)	385 N⋅m (284 lbf⋅ft)	Diesel & Diesel hybrid	8.9–6.9 L/100 km (26–34 mpg_{‑US})	186–204 g/km (10.6–11.6 oz/mi)
2017–2023	2.0 L EcoBlue	125 kW (168 hp)	405 N⋅m (299 lbf⋅ft)	Diesel & Diesel hybrid	8.9–7.0 L/100 km (26–34 mpg_{‑US})	184–234 g/km (10.4–13.3 oz/mi)
2017–2023	2.0 L EcoBlue	136 kW (182 hp)		Diesel & Diesel hybrid	7.6–6.2 L/100 km (31–38 mpg_{‑US})	186–234 g/km (10.6–13.3 oz/mi)
2019–2023	1.0 L EcoBoost	92 kW (123 hp)	355 N⋅m (262 lbf⋅ft)	Petrol hybrid	7.7–6.9 L/100 km (31–34 mpg_{‑US})	210–234 g/km (11.9–13.3 oz/mi)

Ford Transit Custom key dimensions & combinations
Length Roof			L1	L2
Length Roof			4,973 mm (195.8 in)	5,340 mm (210 in)
H1	1,922–2,000 mm 75.7–78.7 in	Volume	5.7 m^{3} (200 cu ft)	6.6 m^{3} (230 cu ft)
H1	1,922–2,000 mm 75.7–78.7 in	Interior (L×W×H)	2,554 mm × 1,351 mm × 1,406 mm 100.6 in × 53.2 in × 55.4 in	2,921 mm × 1,351 mm × 1,406 mm 115.0 in × 53.2 in × 55.4 in
H1	1,922–2,000 mm 75.7–78.7 in	GVWR	2,600–3,200 kg (5,700–7,100 lb)	2,900–3,400 kg (6,400–7,500 lb)
H2	2,285–2,366 mm 90.0–93.1 in	Volume	7.2 m^{3} (250 cu ft)	8.2 m^{3} (290 cu ft)
H2	2,285–2,366 mm 90.0–93.1 in	Interior (L×W×H)	2,554 mm × 1,351 mm × 1,778 mm 100.6 in × 53.2 in × 70.0 in	2,921 mm × 1,351 mm × 1,778 mm 115.0 in × 53.2 in × 70.0 in
H2	2,285–2,366 mm 90.0–93.1 in	GVWR	2,600–3,200 kg (5,700–7,100 lb)	2,900–3,400 kg (6,400–7,500 lb)

=== Models ===
==== Transit Custom Nugget ====
The Ford Transit Custom Nugget is a small van designed as a camper (aka campervan) that is sold by Ford and converted by Westfalia. It has various features of overnight camping, such as a sink, stove, and foldout beds. The "Nugget" was launched in select European markets in the spring of 2019.

==== Swift Monza ====
The Swift Monza is a campervan conversion produced by Swift Leisure and based on the Tourneo version of the Transit Custom. It is available with the 2.0 EcoBlue 128PS turbodiesel engine. It is aimed at young families.

=== Markets ===
==== Vietnam ====
The Transit Custom was released in Vietnam on September 12, 2019 until June 2021 as the Tourneo. Assembled at Ford Vietnam manufacturing facility, it is offered in Trend and Titanium (7 seater, SWB) variants with 2.0 L EcoBoost inline-4 petrol engine (rated at 203 horsepower and 300 Nm) with 6-speed automatic transmission as the single powertrain option.

==== China ====
In February 2023, the Jiangling Ford joint venture launched a facelifted version of the outgoing first generation for the Chinese market called the Transit V362. A 2 litre turbo diesel engine is standard alongside two transmission options across the range: a 5 speed manual and a 9 speed automatic.

=== Gallery ===
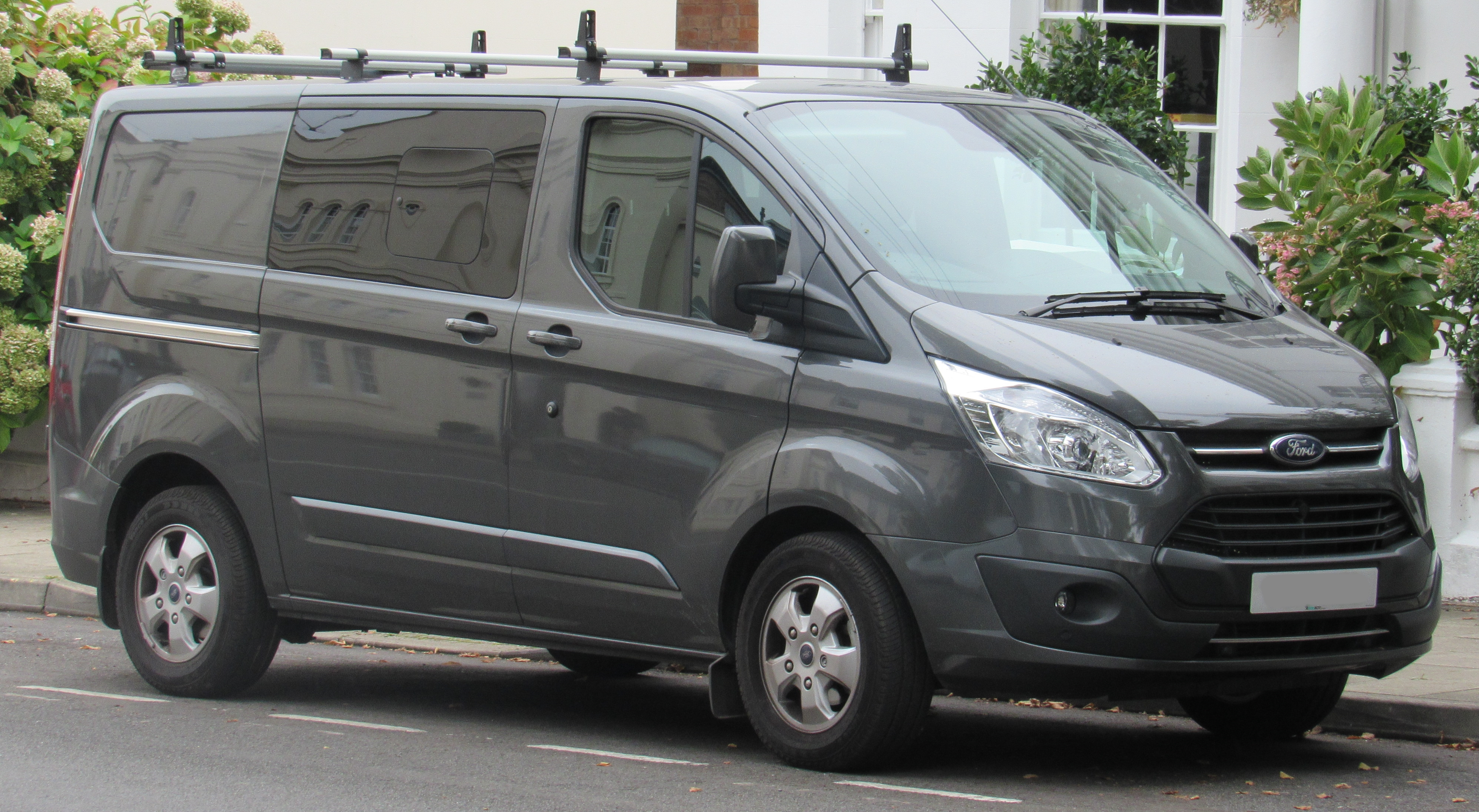
Ford Transit Custom Crew Cab (United Kingdom; pre-facelift)

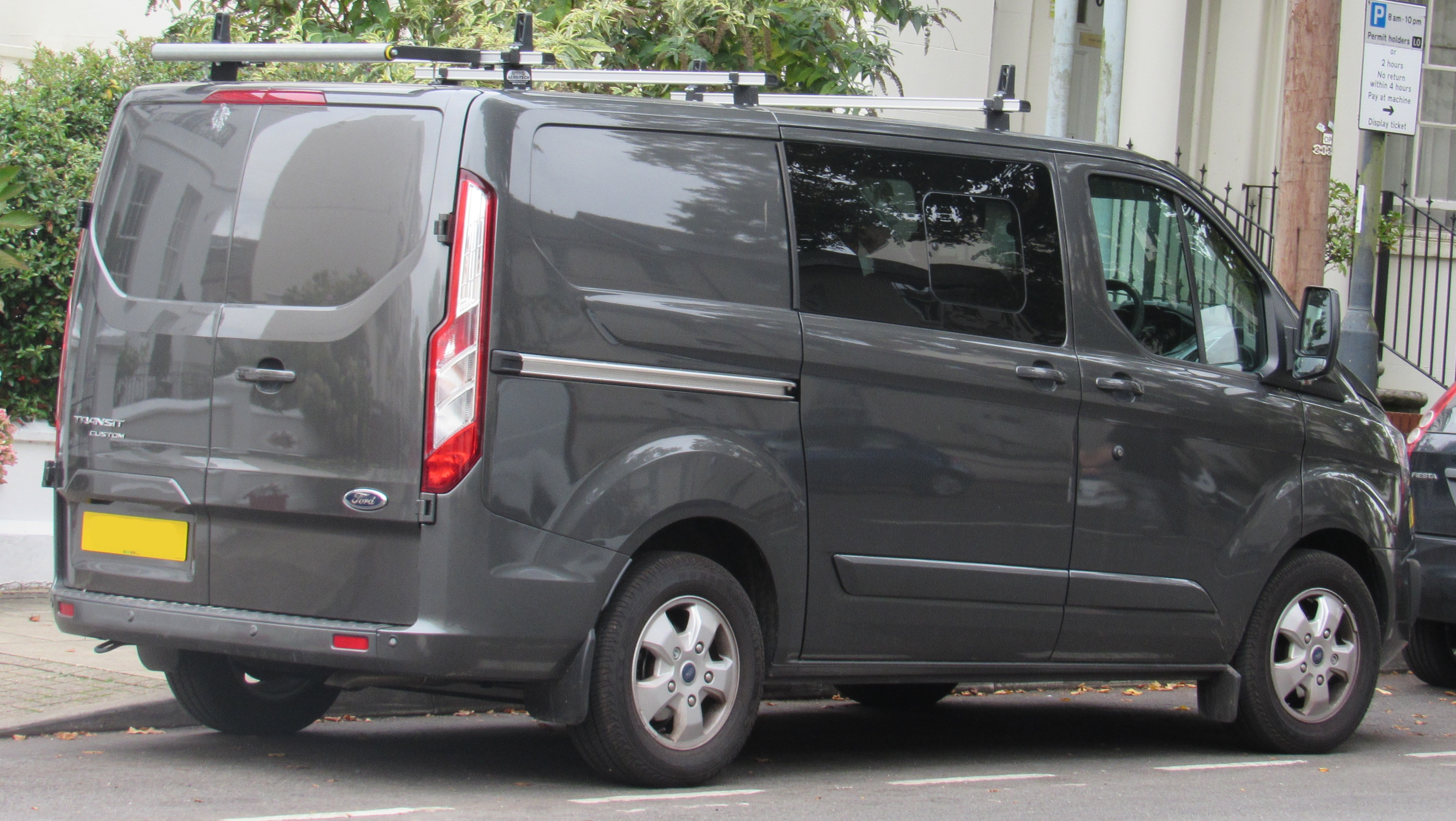
Ford Transit Custom Crew Cab (United Kingdom; pre-facelift)

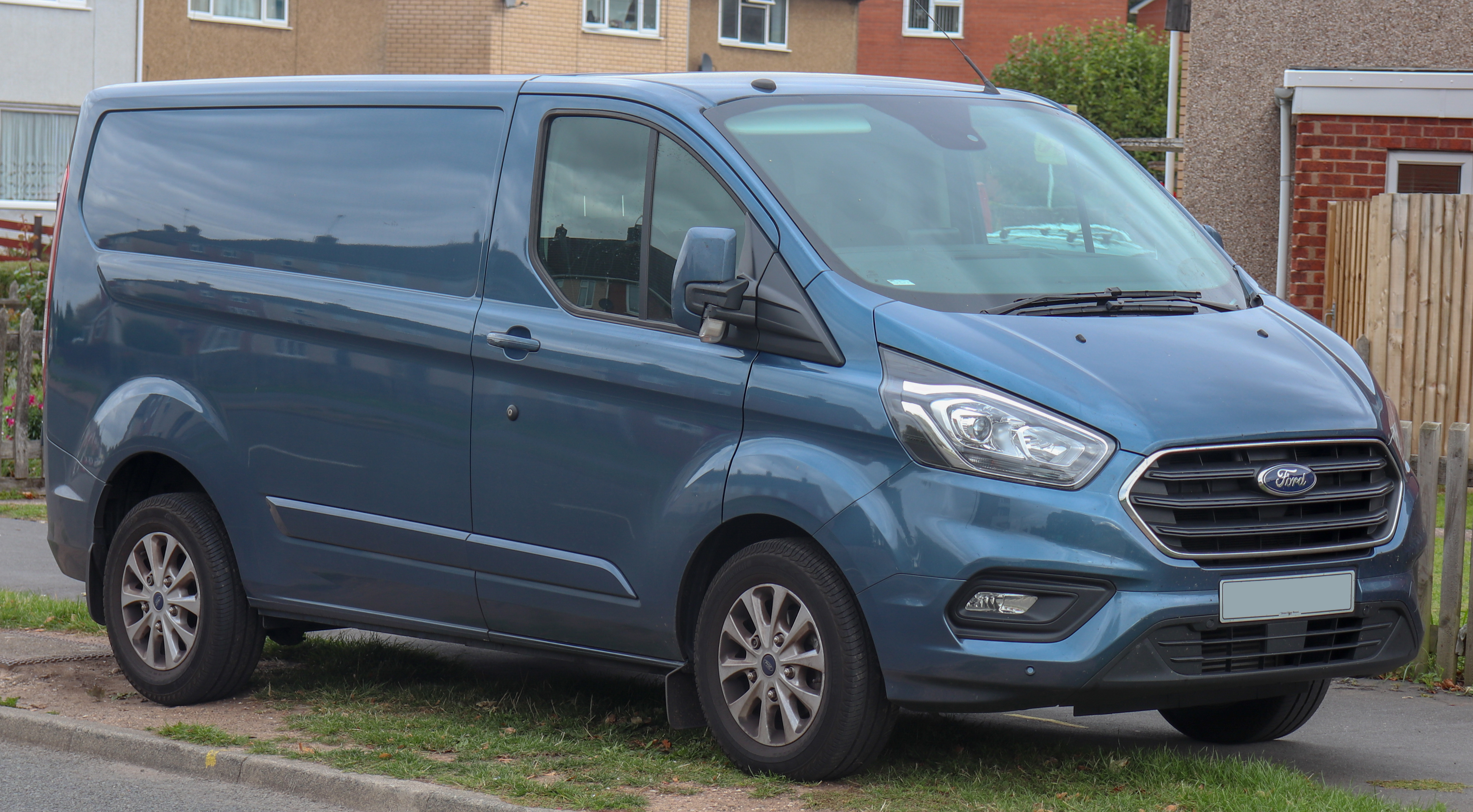
Ford Transit Custom (United Kingdom; facelift)

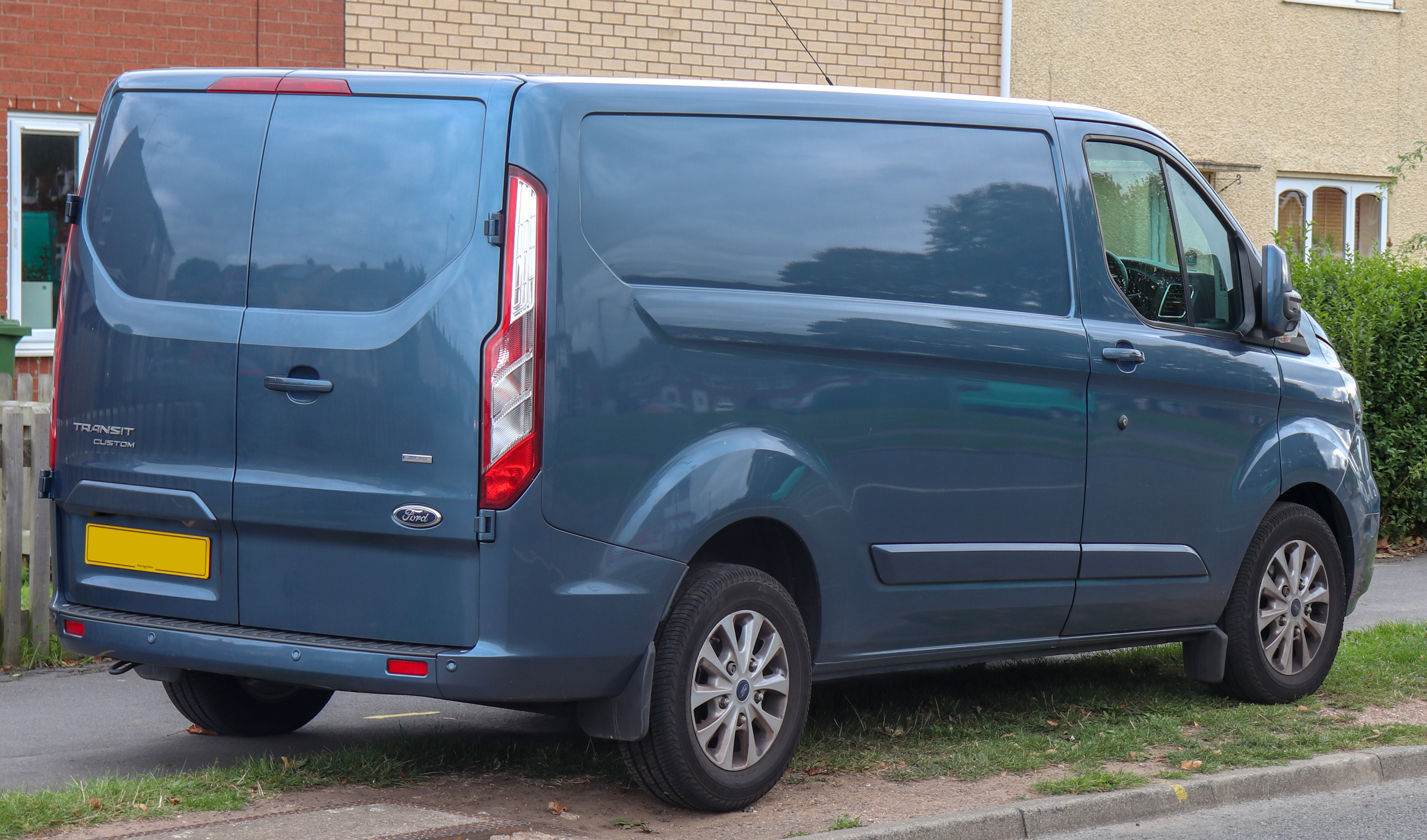
Ford Transit Custom (United Kingdom; facelift)

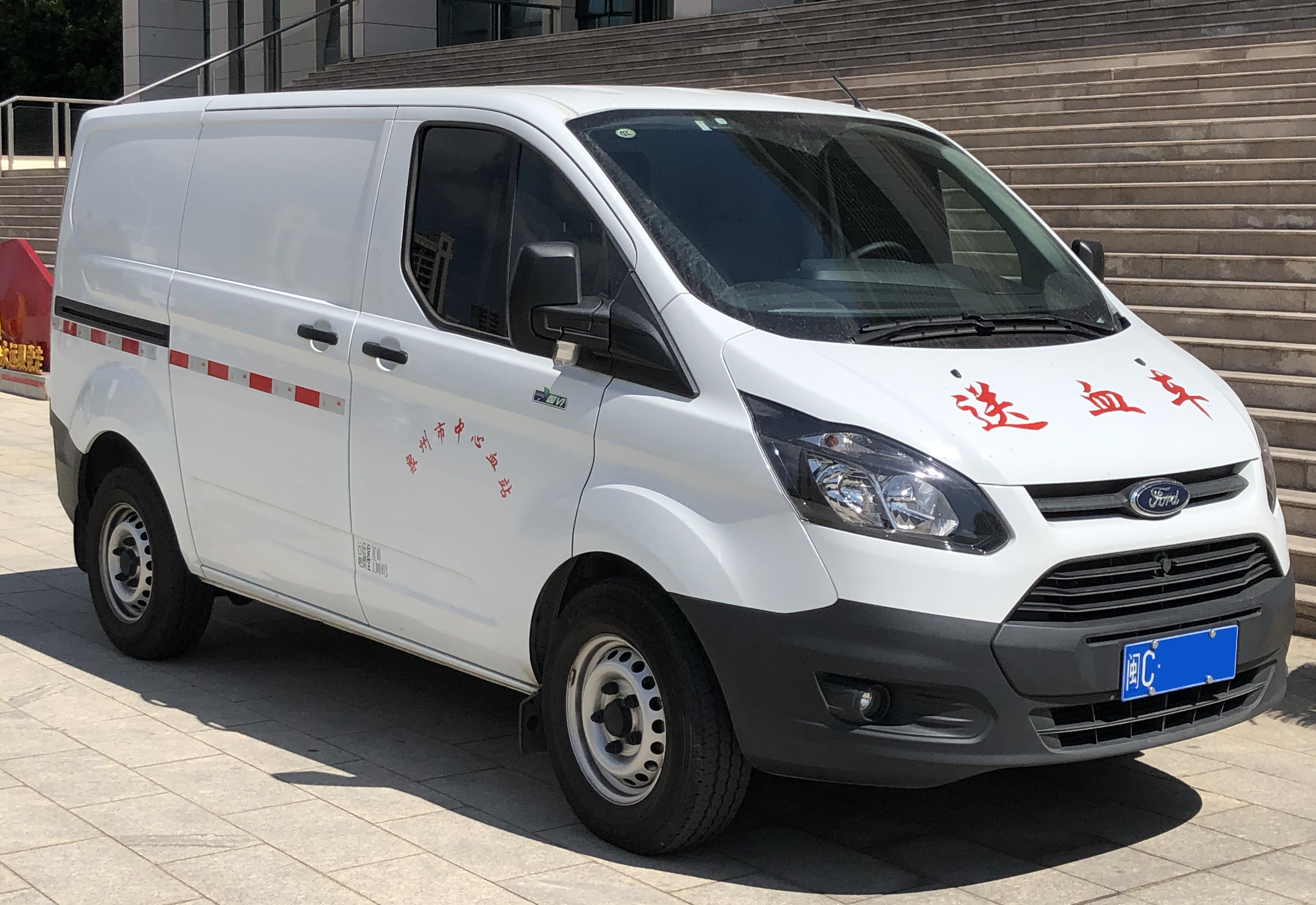
Ford Transit (China; pre-facelift)

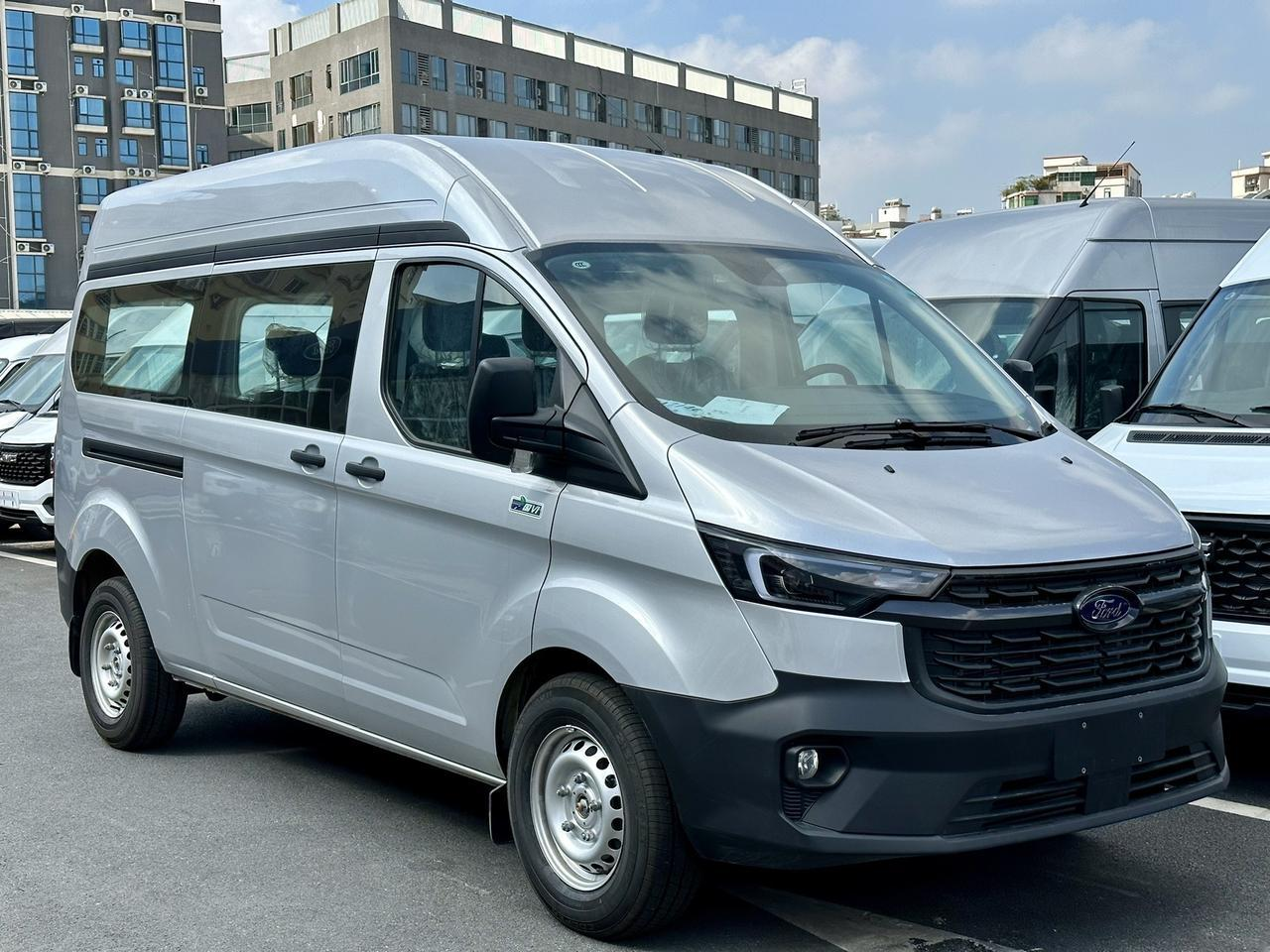
Ford Transit V362 (China; 2023 facelift)

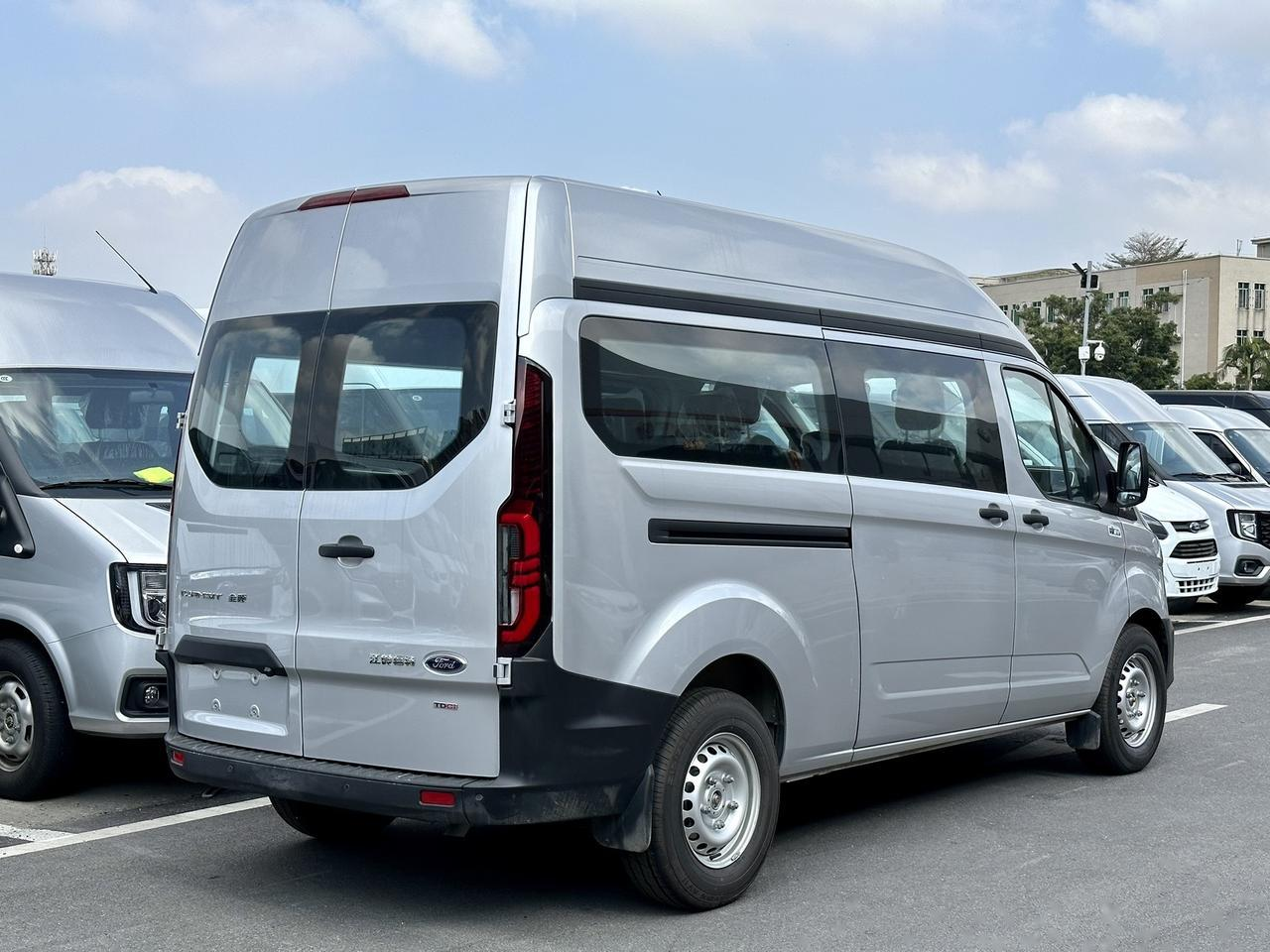
Ford Transit V362 (China; 2023 facelift)

=== Safety ===
ANCAP test results* Ford Transit Custom all Australian variants (Mar 2014-Aug 2019) & all New Zealand variants (Mar 2016-Apr 2018) (2012, aligned with Euro NCAP)
Test	Points	%
Overall:	5 /5 stars	
Adult occupant:	30.3	84%
Child occupant:	44	90%
Pedestrian:	14.2	48%
Safety assist:	5	71%

ANCAP test results* Ford Transit Custom all Australian MY19 & New Zealand MY18.5 variants (2012, aligned with Euro NCAP)
Test	Points	%
Overall:	5 /5 stars	
Adult occupant:	30.3	84%
Child occupant:	44	90%
Pedestrian:	14.2	48%
Safety assist:	5	71%

ANCAP test results Ford Transit Custom all first-generation variants (2022)
Overall
Grading:	63% (Gold)

Euro NCAP test results* Ford Transit Custom 2.2 diesel Trend Kombi (LHD) (2012)
Test	Points	%
Overall:	5 /5 stars	
Adult occupant:	30	84%
Child occupant:	44	90%
Pedestrian:	14	48%
Safety assist:	5	71%

== Second generation (2023) ==
Second generation
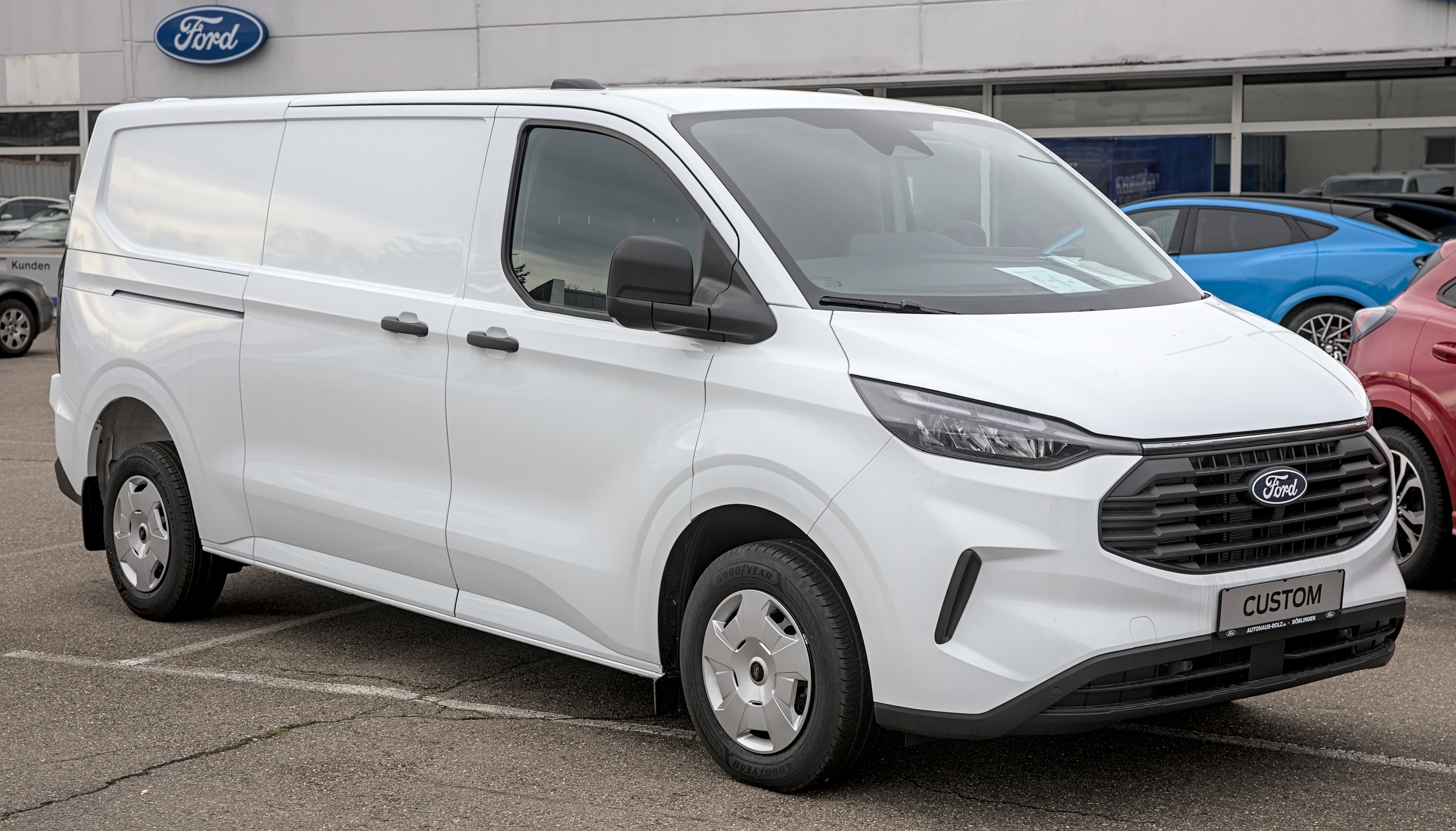

Overview
- Also called: Ford Tourneo Custom
- Production: 2023–present
- Assembly: Turkey: Gölcük, Kocaeli (Ford Otosan)

Body and chassis
- Body style: 5-door MPV
- Layout: Front-engine, front-wheel-drive Rear-motor, rear-wheel-drive (EV); Front-engine, four-wheel-drive Dual-motor, all-wheel-drive (EV)
- Platform: Ford Pro Platform
- Related: Volkswagen Transporter (2024)

Powertrain
- Engine: Diesel: 2.0 L EcoBlue I4; Petrol hybrid: 2.5 L Duratec PHEV I4
- Electric motor: EKRA Permanent magnet motor(s)
- Transmission: 6-speed manual 8-speed automatic
- Battery: 82.5 kWh (64 kWh usable) NMC (EV)

Dimensions
- Wheelbase: 3,100–3,500 mm (122.0–137.8 in)

The second generation Transit Custom was unveiled in September 2022, with production to commence at Ford Otosan in 2023. The Volkswagen Transporter will be a rebadge of the second generation Transit Custom. For the first time, the Transit Custom van is fitted with a new semi-trailing arm independent rear suspension design that contributes towards the lower floor height and handling . The front wheels and strut towers have been repositioned further forward resulting in better cross-cab access, improved foot space and footrests for occupants in the front, as well as a shorter front overhang.

On November 22, 2022, the passenger version, the Tourneo Custom, was revealed. Like the panel van, the MPV will be available in electric, plug-in hybrid and diesel versions, as well as the Active crossover variant.

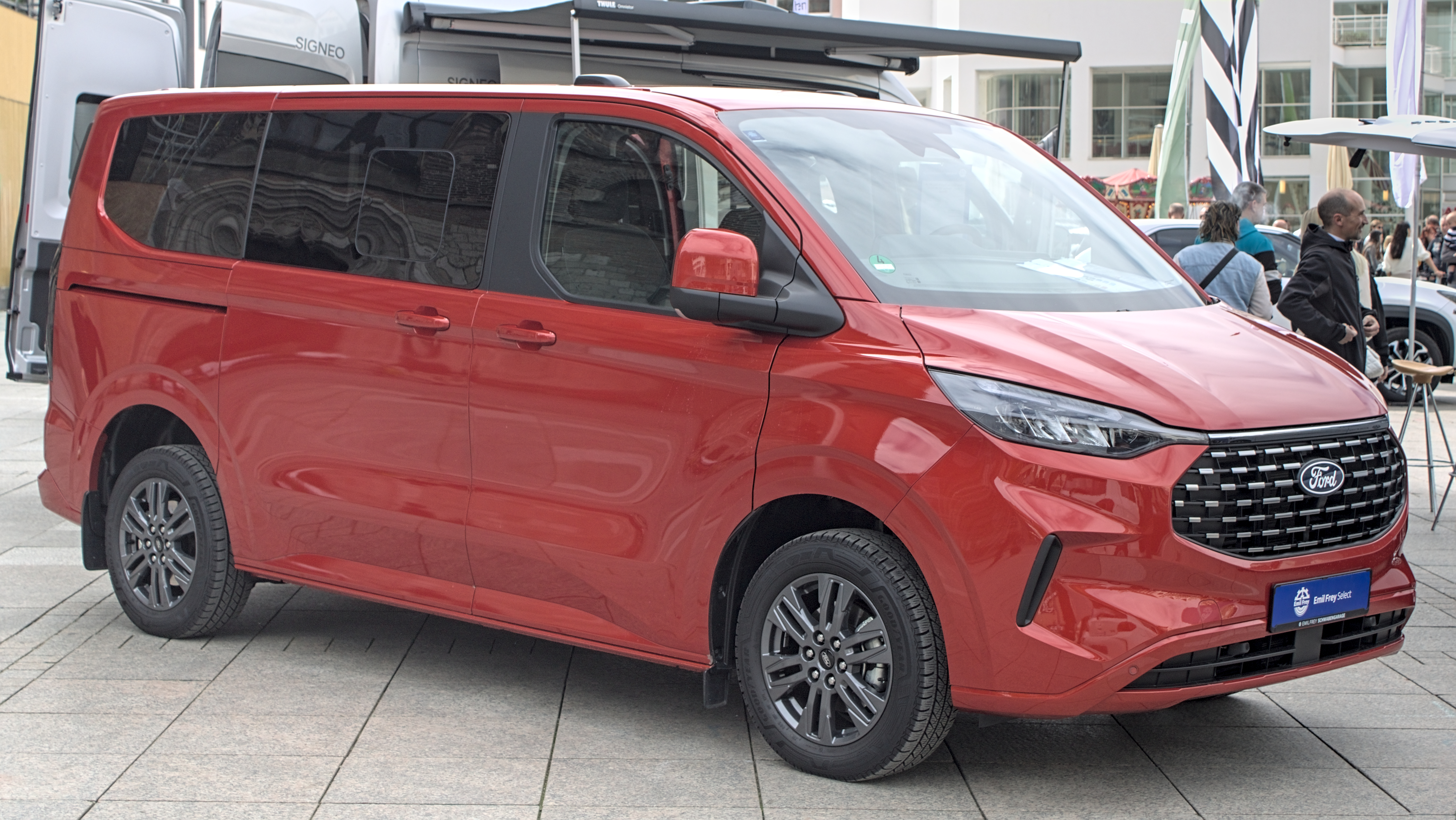
Tourneo Custom

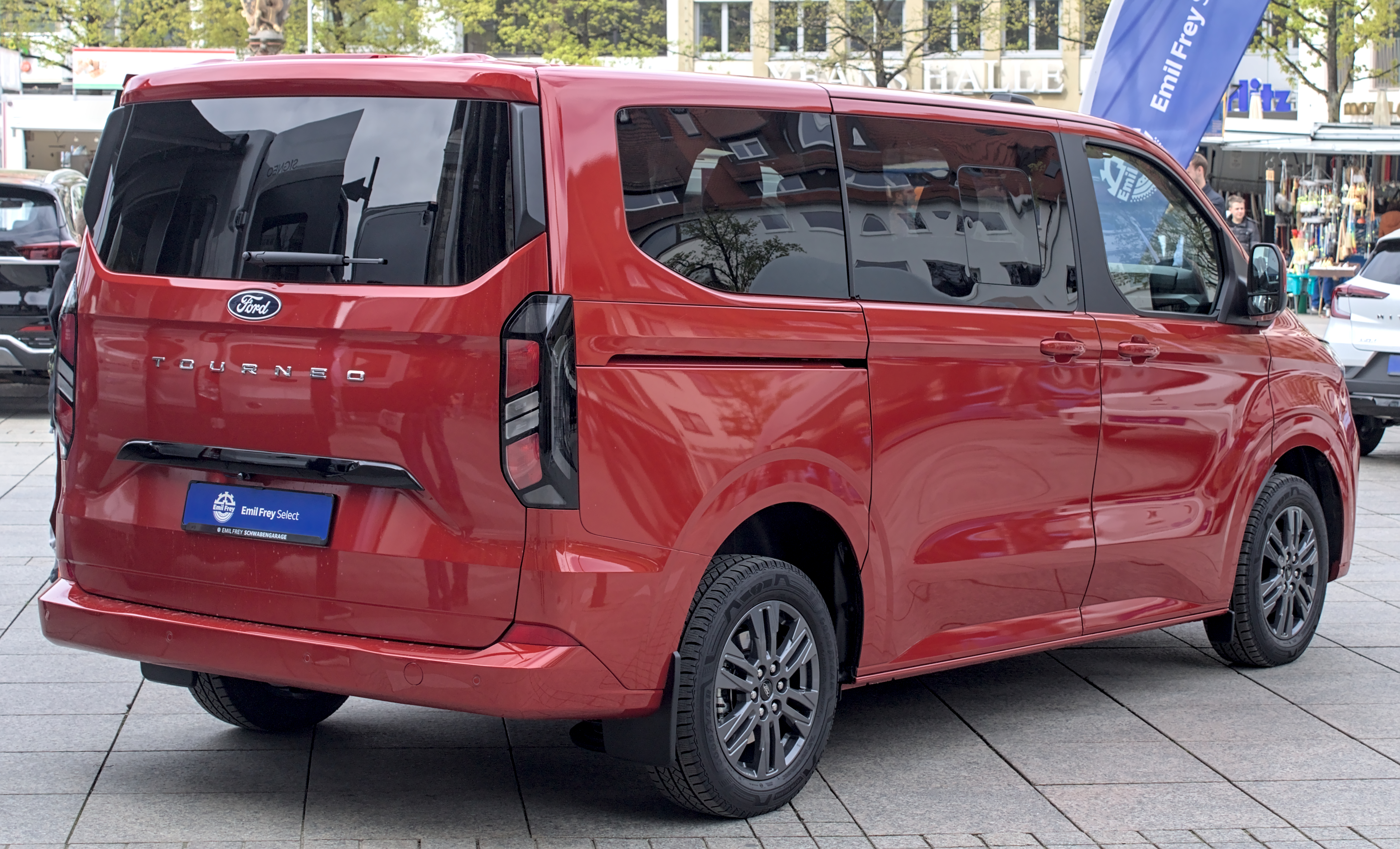
Rear view (Tourneo Custom)

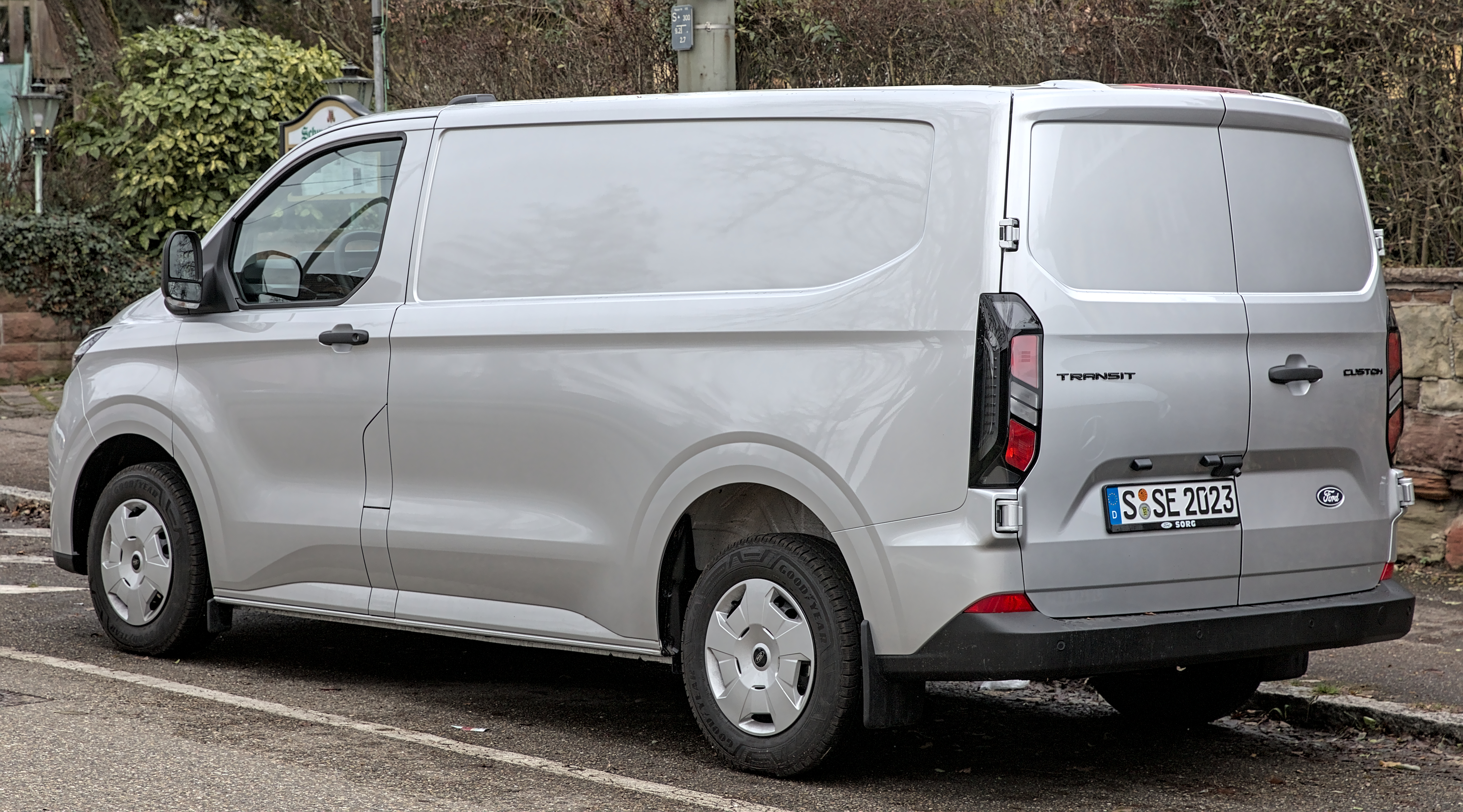
Rear view (Transit Custom)

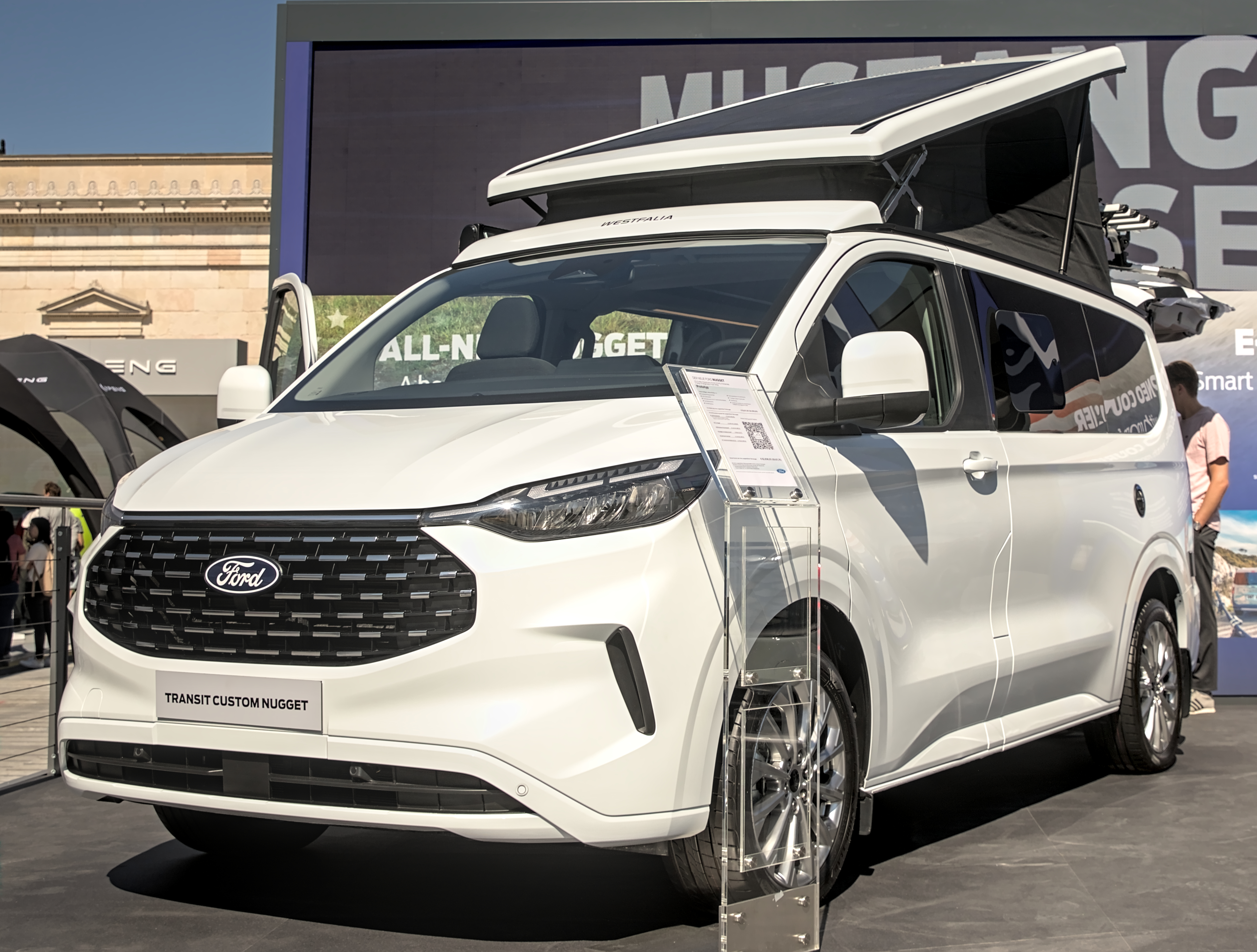
Tourneo Custom Nugget

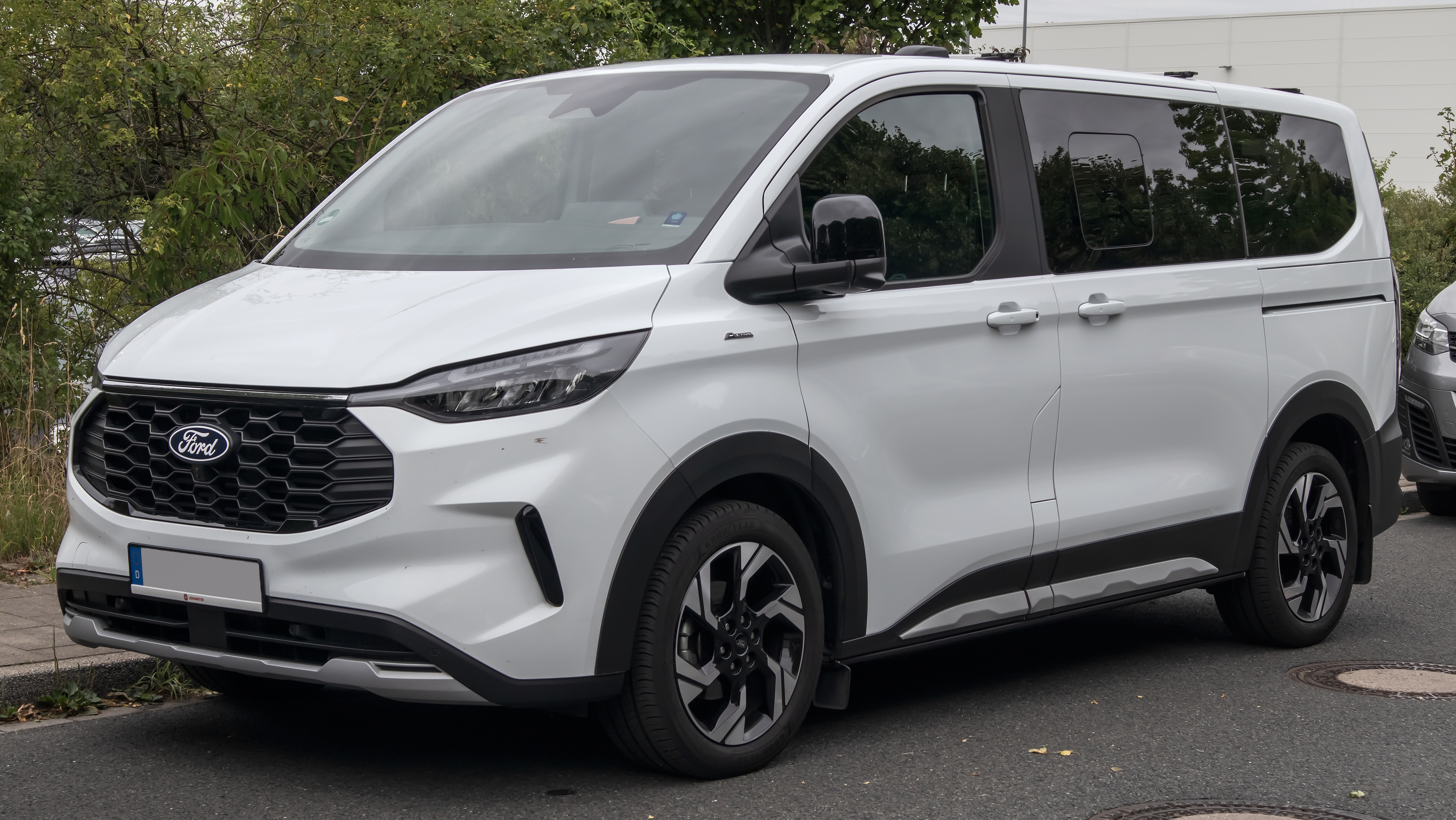
Tourneo Custom Active

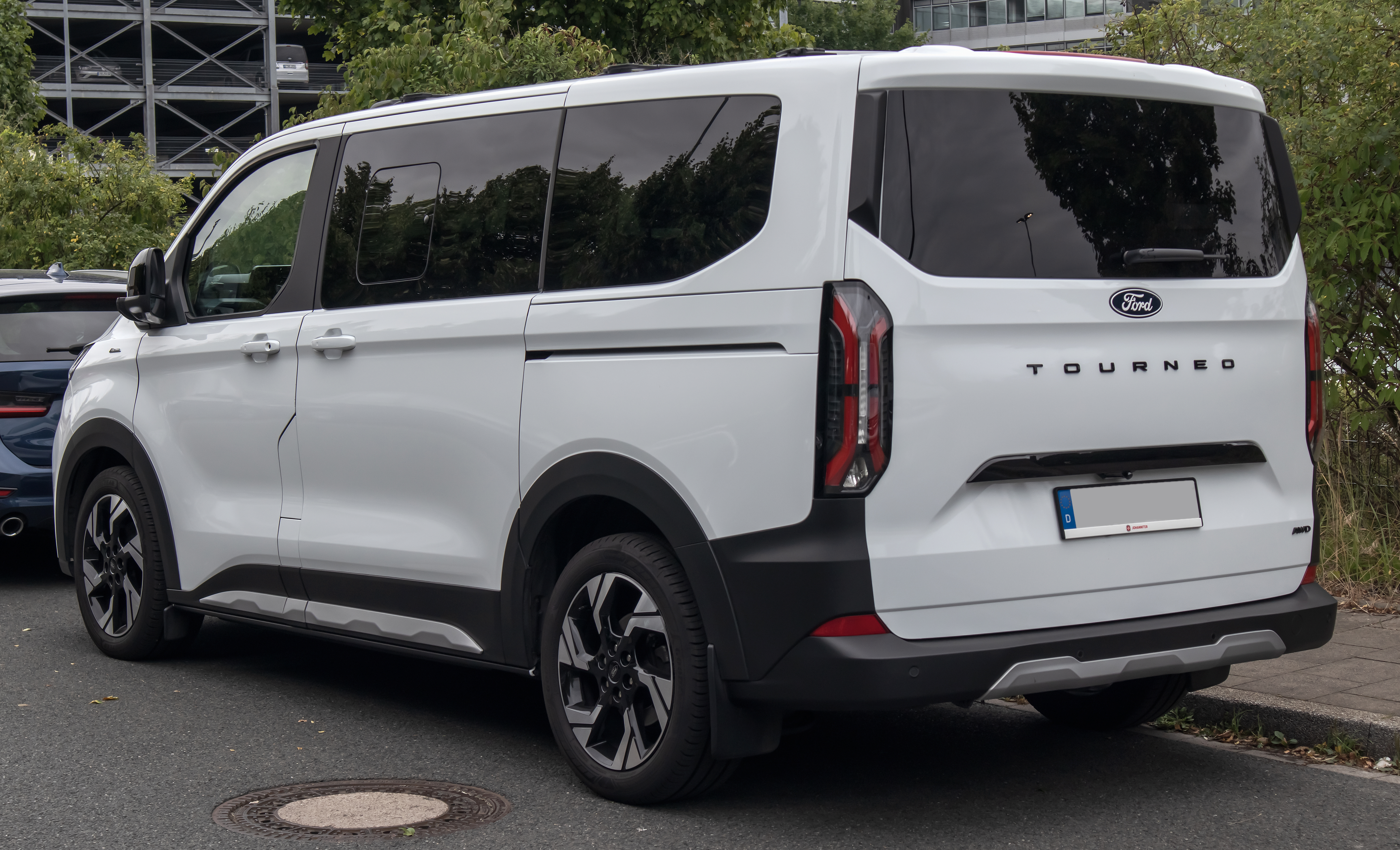
Rear view (Tourneo Custom Active)

=== E-Transit Custom ===
The E-Transit Custom is a battery-electric panel van variant announced in March 2021 alongside the second-generation Transit Custom and given its final name in May 2022. Key specifications include an estimated range of 263 mi (423 km) using the WLTP driving cycle. Production of the E-Transit Custom is expected to begin in the second half of 2023 at Ford Otosan. The all-electric E-Transit Custom adds another drivetrain option to both the VW T7 Transporter and the Ford Transit Custom, which are expected to continue offering mild hybrid, plug-in hybrid, and diesel options.

The 400 V traction battery of the E-Transit Custom uses the same pouch cells as the Ford F-150 Lightning, with a total useable capacity of 74 kW-hr. The revised target range is 380 km (240 mi). Charging at rates of up to 125 kW (DC) or 11 kW (AC) are possible. The traction motor output power is either 100 or 160 kW (130 or 210 hp), depending on the purchaser's choice, with a peak output torque of 415 N⋅m (306 lbf⋅ft) for both variants.

Maximum cargo volume ranges from 5.8 to 9.0 m^{3} (200 to 320 cu ft) carrying a load of up to 1,100 kg (2,400 lb); the maximum length of cargo that can be accommodated is 3,450 mm (136 in). The van will be offered with either short or long wheelbase, and low or high roof.

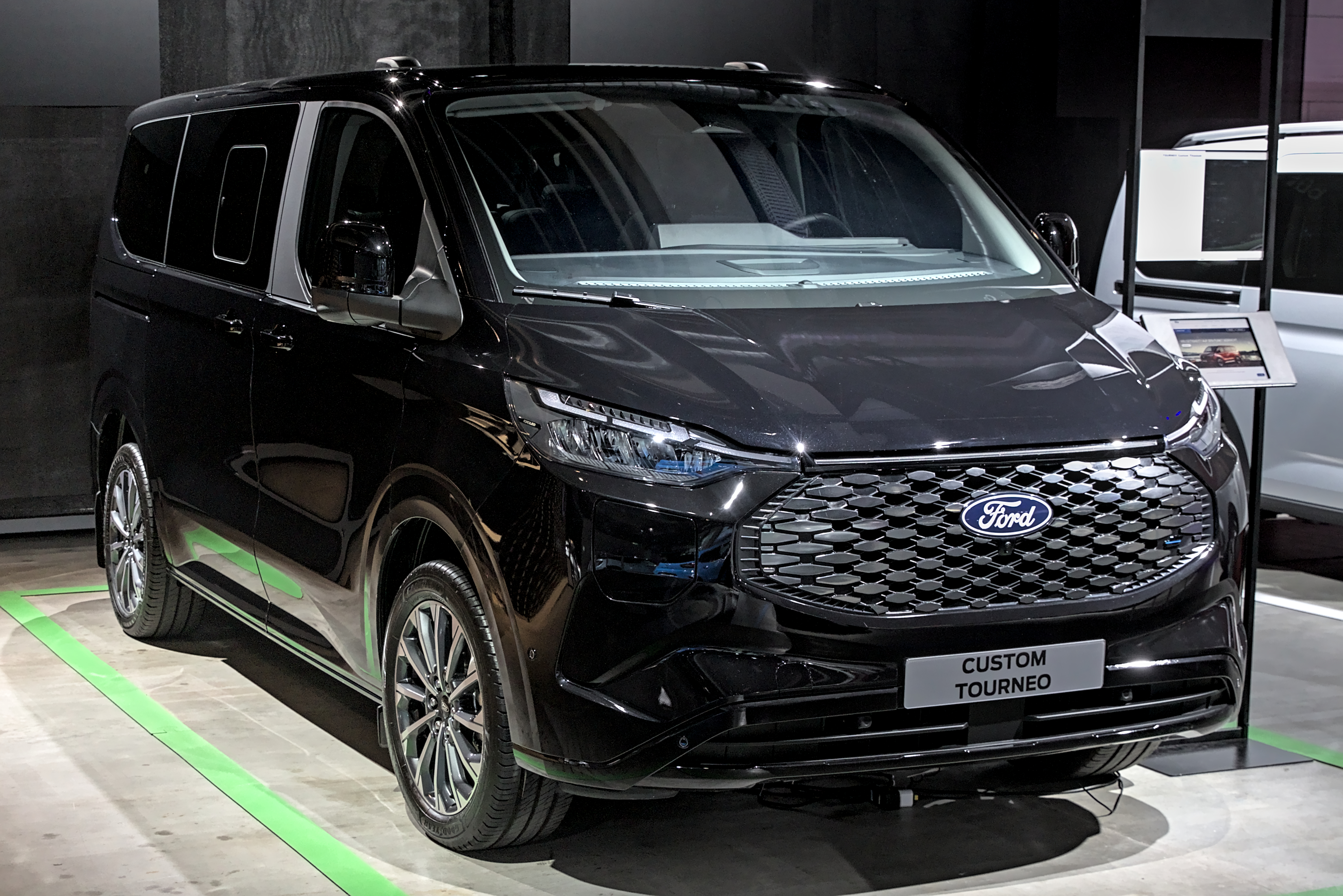
E-Tourneo Custom (front view)

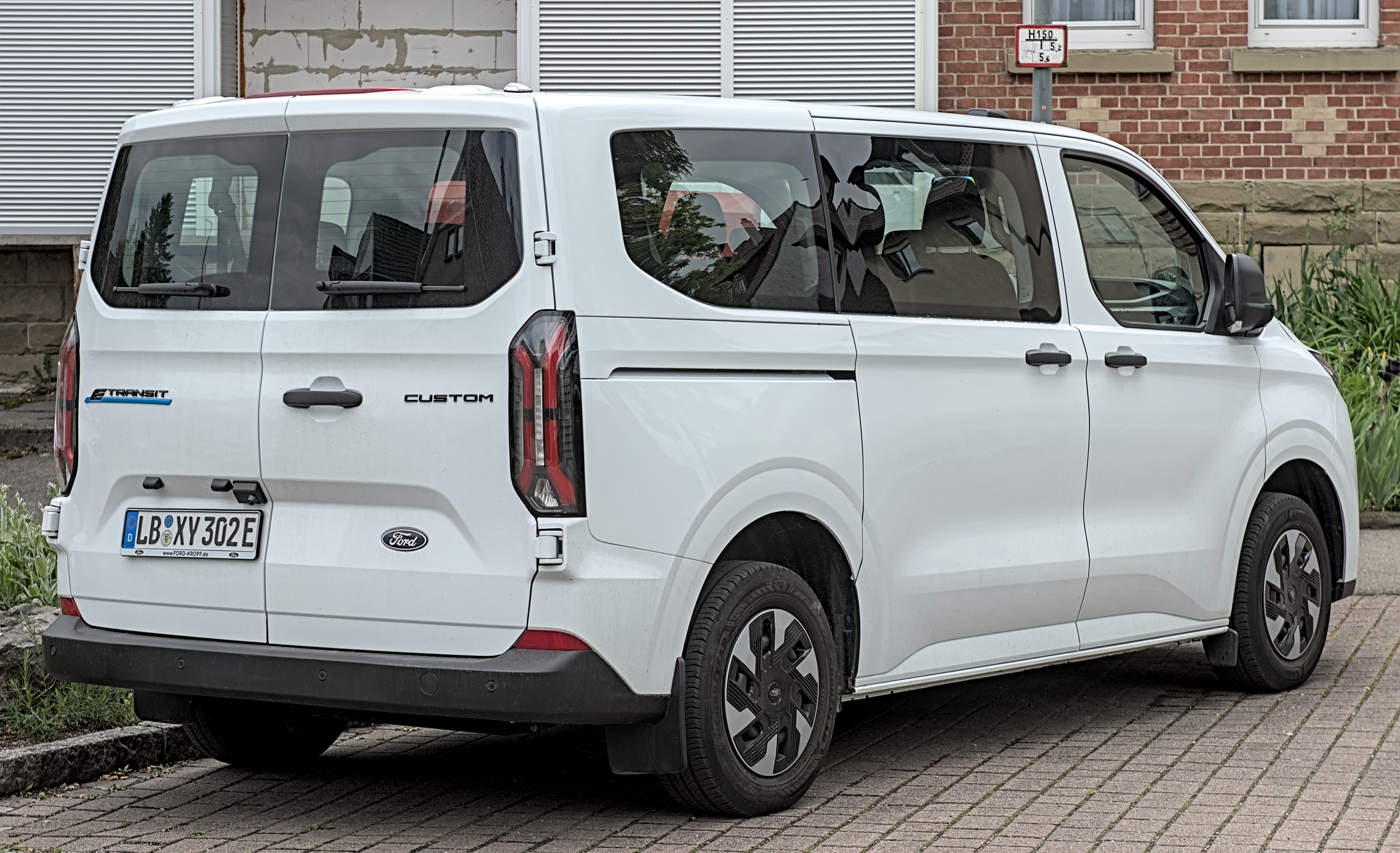
E-Transit Custom (rear view)

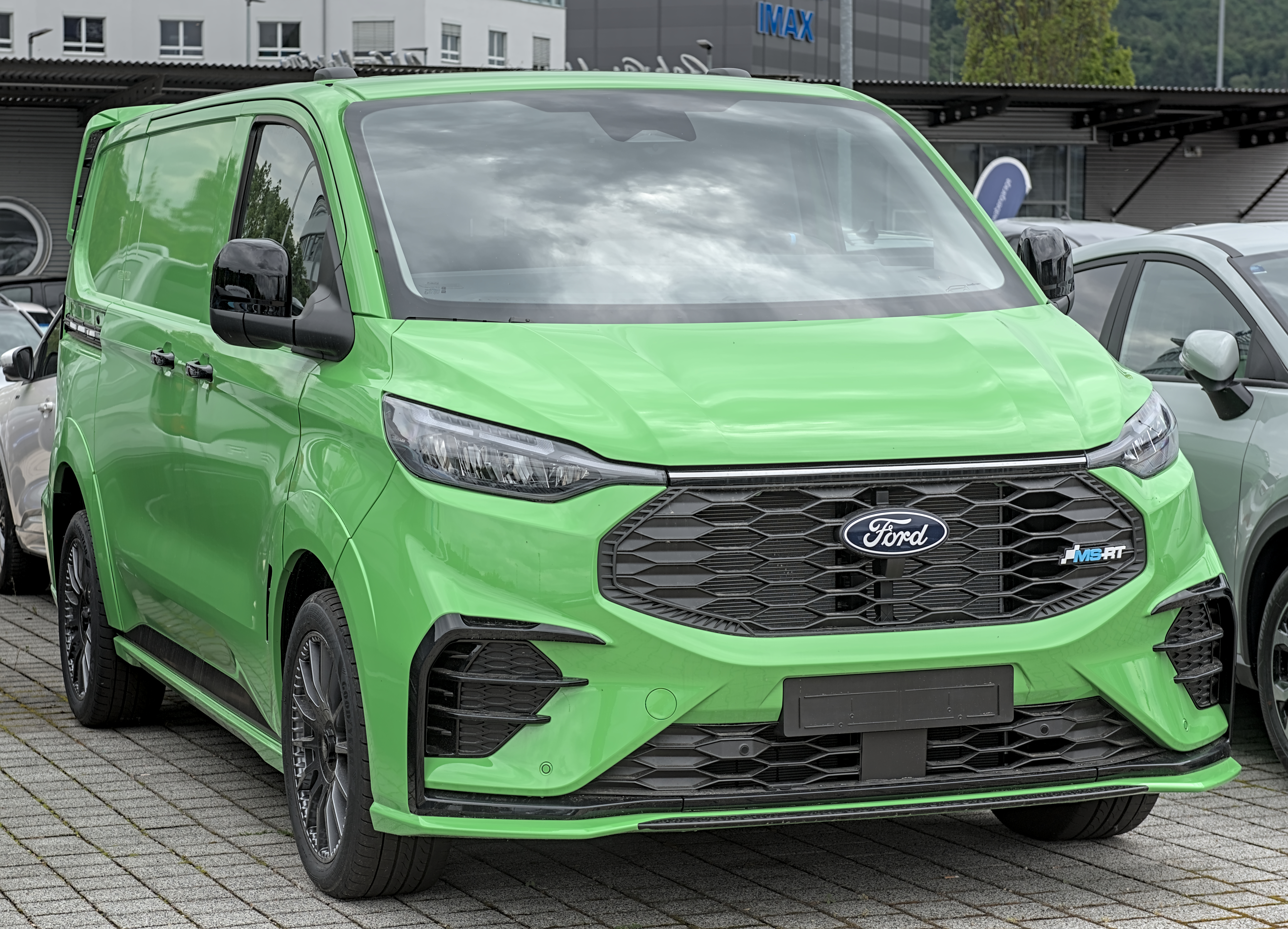
E-Transit Custom MS-RT

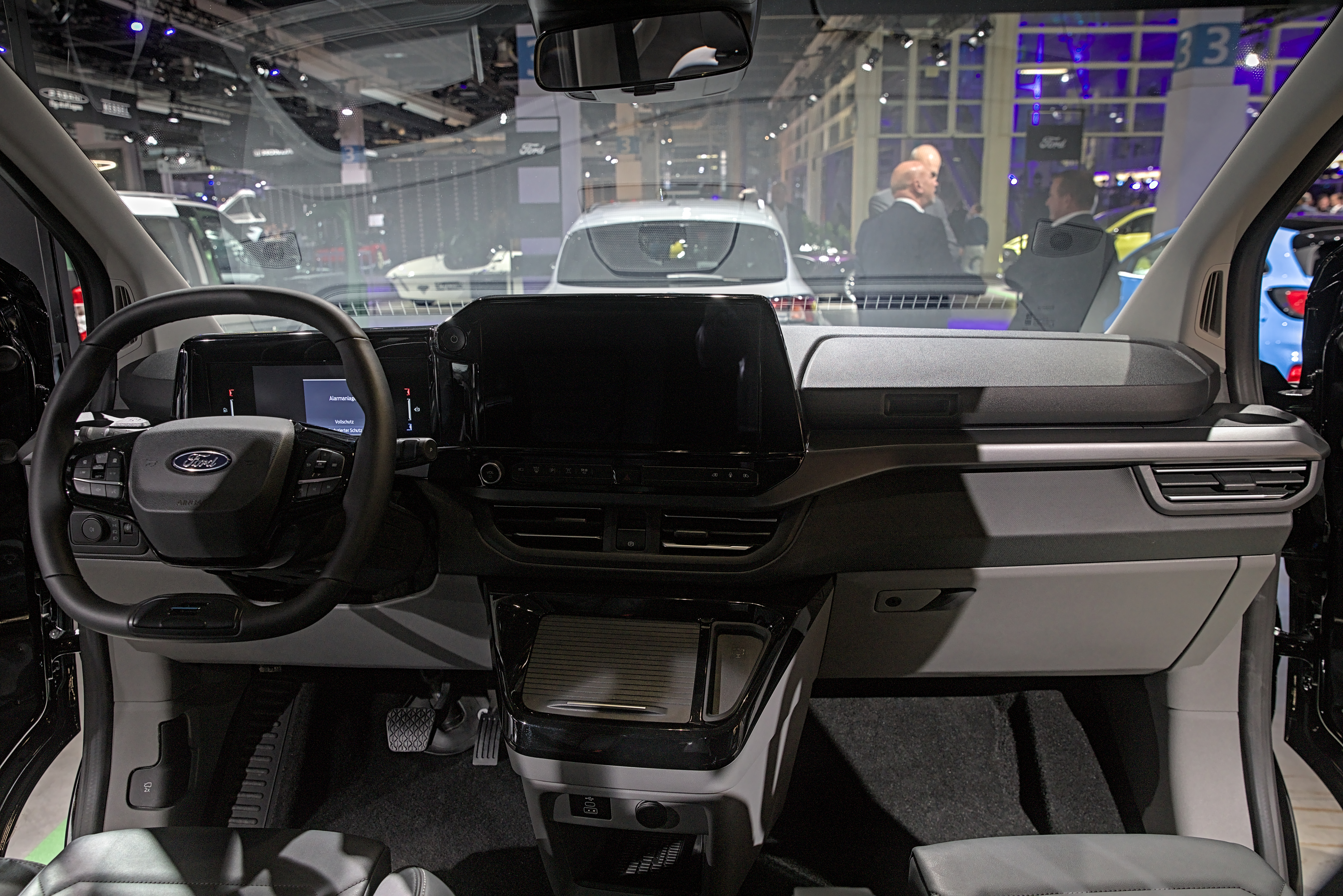
Interior

=== Safety ===
Euro NCAP test results Ford Tourneo Custom 2.0 EcoBlue Titanium (LHD) (2024)
Test	Points	%
Overall:	3 /5 stars	
Adult occupant:	30.2	75%
Child occupant:	42.6	86%
Pedestrian:	48.6	77%
Safety assist:	9.7	53%

Euro NCAP test results Ford Transit Custom (2025)
Test	Score
Overall:	5 /5 stars
Safe driving	80%
Crash avoidance	93%
Post crash	80%

ANCAP test results Ford Transit Custom second generation diesel variants (2024)
Overall
Grading:	96% (Platinum)

== Awards ==
Year	Award	Ref(s)
2013	International Van of the Year	
2019	What Van - Medium van of the year	
2018	Most Popular Medium Van	
