= Ümit Yılbar =

Turkish musician and guitarist

- Born: 1966; Kadıköy, Istanbul
- Died: 25 September 1993 (aged 26–27) Bağğöze, Eruh, Siirt
- Genres: Rock; Heavy metal Thrash metal
- Occupations: Performer, songwriter, arranger, record producer
- Instrument: Guitar
- Years active: 1987–1993
- Member of: Pentagram (1987–1989)

Ümit Yılbar (1966, Kadıköy, Istanbul – 25 September 1993, Bağgöze, Siirt) was a Turkish musician and guitarist. Yılbar, one of the guitarists of Mezarkabul (known as Pentagram in Turkey), one of Turkey's famous heavy metal bands, voluntarily became a commando while performing his military service as a sub-lieutenant, and died at the age of 27 during a conflict with the PKK in an operation he participated in on 25 September 1993. His body is in Edirnekapı Martyrdom.

In memory of Yılbar, who was also the guitar teacher of Gökhan Özoğuz from the Athena, Athena band dedicated the album One Last Breath and Pentagram band dedicated the song "Fly Forever" from their second album Trail Blazer to him. A street was named after him in Kadıköy, where he was born and raised, to keep his memory alive.
