= Türkcan =

Türkcan is a surname. Notable people with the surname include:

- Metin Türkcan (born 1971), Turkish musician
- Mirsad Türkcan (born 1976), Turkish basketball player
