= Ogun (disambiguation) =

Ogun may refer to:

- Ogun (also Ogún, Gu or Ogúm), a deity of iron and war in the Yoruba religion ad other religions of West Africa.
- Ogun River, a river in southwestern Nigeria.
- Ogun State, a state in southwestern Nigeria.
- Ogun Records, a record label
- Ogun (Marvel Comics), a comic book character.
- Ogun (ruler), Prince of Benin Kingdom crowned as Ewuare.

See also

- Ogün, Turkish name
