= Ogün Sanlısoy =

Turkish musician (born 1971)

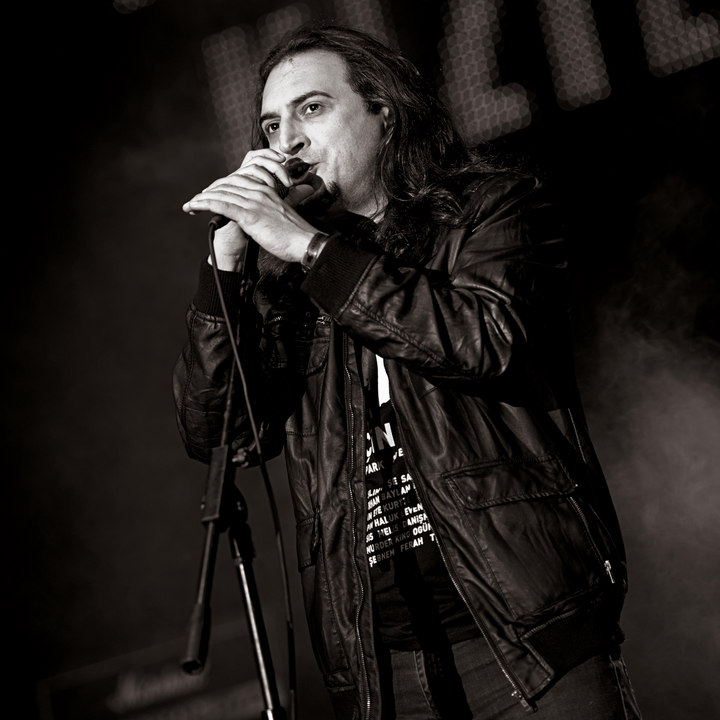

Background information
- Born: 12 March 1971 (age 55); Gölcük, Turkey
- Genres: Rock; Turkish folk music Heavy metal Thrash metal
- Occupations: Performer, songwriter, arranger, record producer
- Instruments: Vocals, guitar
- Years active: 1989–present
- Member of: Pentagram (1992–1995 / 2017–2026)
- Website: www.ogunsanlisoy.com.tr

Ogün Sanlısoy (born 12 March 1971 in Gölcük) is a Turkish musician, vocalist and guitarist for thrash metal band Mezarkabul (known as Pentagram in Turkey).

== Early life ==
Ogün Sanlısoy was born on March 12, 1971, in Gölcük, the son of a Marine officer. Since the 1971 Turkish military memorandum took place on the day he was born, his father named him Ogün —derived from 'O gün', meaning 'That day'— to reflect his belief in democracy.

After his primary school years spent in many different regions and cities due to his father's job, he attended secondary and high school at Fenerbahçe High School. He studied at Mimar Sinan University, Faculty of Architecture (industrial design).

His introduction to music came at the age of eight, when his mother exposed him to artists like Elvis Presley and The Beatles. When he was 10 years old, he attended a Barış Manço concert and had his first serious musical interaction at this concert.

== Music career ==
Sanlısoy started his music career by playing electric guitar at the age of 17, which was his first stage experience with the acoustic concert he prepared together with his close friend Kubilay Özvardar in 1989 during his university years. In the following years, he started working with the Sugar Mice band and recorded his first demo. During this time he performed as a vocalist for various amateur groups.

=== Pentagram (1992–1995) ===
In 1992, while the Turkish metal band Pentagram was preparing for its second studio album, vocalist Bartu Toptaş left the band and moved abroad. While searching for a new vocalist, the band made an offer to Ogün Sanlısoy. He was not interested in a metal band at first, as he pursued his career in acoustic and soft rock in those years. The band members said that their second album would be different from the first album and that they should not make a decision without listening to the recordings. After listening to the recordings and liking the music, he joined Pentagram in 1992 and took part in the Trail Blazer album, which was released the same year, with his vocals. He performed many concerts with Pentagram in Turkey and abroad. In 1993 and 1994, he was voted "Best Male Rock Singer Vocalist of the Year" by the readers of Hıbır and Rock magazines.

While he was working as a vocalist in Pentagram for 3 years, he had a disagreement with the band on the new songs to be produced. While he wanted the band to focus on Turkish songs in the new album, other members did not approve of this change, and as a result of this difference of opinion, Sanlısoy left the band because he wanted to work on a solo album. Pentagram replaced him with Murat İlkan.

=== Solo career (1995–1999) ===
After leaving Pentagram, he took part as a soloist in the Klips group founded by Gür Akad and gave various concerts with this group. He worked as a composer, instrumentalist and supervisor on Özlem Tekin's first album, Kime Ne, which was released in 1995. In 1995, he received an offer from Pentagram's former guitarist Murat Net's project of interpreting English songs in Turkish, but he rejected the offer.

=== Korkma Album (1999–2000) ===
He participated in music activities in different projects for four years after his separation from Pentagram, decided to release a solo album. For his first album, he received help from Tarkan Gözübüyük and Hakan Utangaç from Pentagram, and Deniz Yılmaz from the Kurban on electric guitar. The album was released in 1999 by Raks Music, the popular record company of the time.

However, after the album was released, the 1999 İzmit earthquake occurred and he did not have the opportunity to promote the album or give a concert. The album failed to make a splash. He completed his compulsory military service in 2000.

=== O Gün Album (2000–2006) ===
While he was on military service in Çanakkale in 2000, he laid the foundations of the song Saydım, which would later become one of Sanlısoy's hits. Influenced by the military environment, he produced the chorus and basic music of the song Saydım. He completed and recorded the song after his military service was completed. He worked on the album for 4 years. In this process, he completed the songs and recorded them on a CD without anyone's help. He submitted demo recordings to seven record companies. Ultimately, Sony Music decided to release the album. The album was released in 2004 under the name O Gün. The album also included Ferdi Tayfur's cover of Ben de Özledim. Ogün Sanlısoy made the following statement about the album name:

"5 years have passed between the first album and this album. I had a lot of question marks in my mind about the release date of this album, when I was very worried and wondering if it would be released, I said that this album will be released one day, of course it will be released one day and I said I will see THAT DAY and I said the album name should be O Gün, THAT DAY has come...."

During the recording of this album, Timur Kurşunoğlu on drums and tambourines, Faruk Kavi on electric, acoustic guitar and e-bow, and Umut Arabacı on bass guitar accompanied him.

=== Üç, Ben and Sen Uyurken Albums (2006–...) ===
He worked with his friends Metin Türkcan and Tarkan Gözübüyük from the Pentagram on his album Üç, which was released in 2006. With this album, he was chosen as the "Best Rock Music Vocalist of the Year" by many magazines. In 2007, he re-released the album Korkma with new versions of 3 tracks and a DVD of the footage he took with his handheld camera during the album recording. He performed a duet with Hayko Cepkin in the new version of the song Korkma. In 2008, he took part in the song Iyiler Siyah Giyer with his vocals in the rock band Almôra's album Kıyamet Senfonisi – The Symphony of Judgement. In 2009, the single named Büyüdük Aniden and later the single Yukarıya Bak were released. He also made a duet with rap singer Killa Hakan for his album Volume Maximum.

On 7 February 2011, he released his fourth solo album Ben. While the album was produced by Volkan Başaran, Sanlısoy was accompanied by Aytek Akçakaya on guitar, Sertan Coşkun on bass guitar, and Sertan Soğukpınar on drums. The album was recorded in 5 different studios. The mastering was done by Mika Jussila at Helsinki Finnvox Studios, which masters world-famous bands. Uğur Memiş made the mixes. There are 13 tracks in the album, and the lyrics and music of 12 of these tracks belong to him. In addition, the new arrangement of Anma Dost, one of the songs engraved in our minds with the lyrics and music of Selahattin Sarıkaya and the voice of Erkin Koray, is also included in the album. The first video clip of the album was shot by Mahir Akyol for the song Avunmak Zor. The image photographs of the album are also signed by Mehmet Turgut.

In 2011, she took part with her vocals in the song Girdap from the album Girdap by the Turkish rock metal band İklim. In the same year, Sanlısoy performed a duet with Nilüfer in the song Hey Gidi Günler in the rock album named 12 Düet.

In April 2016, he took part in Metin Türkcan's solo album Vakti Geldi with his vocals in the song Beynim Çatlamış.

In 2017, he again took part with his vocals in the Acoustik album released for Pentagram's 30th anniversary. Subsequently, he rejoined Pentagram together with Demir Demirkan and Murat İlkan.

On February 24, 2021, he attended an online event at Ekşi Sözlük where he stated that "he directed the first video clip of his latest album, Yaşamaya Devam, he loved this job very much and wanted to direct the video clips of other bands."

While he was preparing for a new album in 2019, his album was postponed due to the COVID-19 pandemic. He released an acoustic album called Yaşamaya Devam in 2021 to evaluate the pandemic period. He announced that his new album will be released in 2023 and that he will try a first and release the albums as two EP albums consisting of five songs each. His first EP album called Gel was released on April 14, 2023. The first single from the album, İnan Olma, was released on March 31, 2023.

== Albums ==
with Pentagram

- 1990: Pentagram
- 1992: Trail Blazer
- 1997: Anatolia
- 2001: Unspoken
- 2002: Bir
- 2012: MMXII
- 2017: Trail Blazer Acoustic
- 2020: Bu Düzen Yıkılsın (Single)
- 2021: Sur (Single)
- 2021: Pride (Single)
- 2022: Makina Elektrika

Solo

- 1999: Korkma
- 2004: O Gün
- 2006: Üç
- 2007: Korkma 07
- 2011: Ben
- 2012: Akustik
- 2015: Sen Uyurken
- 2021: Yaşamaya Devam

EP's

- 2023: Gel
- 2024: Git

Singles

- 1999: Başkoyduk
- 1999: Kaybettik Severken
- 2004: Pencere
- 2004: Saydım
- 2004: Ben De Özledim
- 2004: Bana Bi Sor
- 2006: Bilmece
- 2006: Hadi Beni Güldür
- 2006: Sınav (Koşu Basladı)
- 2007: Korkma'07 (feat Hayko Cepkin)
- 2008: İyiler Siyah Giyer (feat Almora)
- 2009: Dayanamazsın (feat Killa Hakan)
- 2009: Büyüdük Aniden
- 2009: Yukarıya Bak
- 2011: Avunmak Zor
- 2011: Anma Arkadaş
- 2011: Bu Ne Biçim Aşk
- 2011: Dikenli Menzil
- 2011: Girdap (feat İklim)
- 2011: Kol Düğmeleri (feat Kurtalan Ekspres)
- 2011: Hey Gidi Günler (feat Nilüfer)
- 2012: Dayanamam (feat Özlem Tekin)
- 2012: Geçer Zaman
- 2014: Sonra Git
- 2015: Merhem
- 2015: Son Defa
- 2015: Sen
- 2015: Akacak Kan Yerinde Durmaz
- 2016: Beynim Çatladı (feat Metin Türkcan)
- 2017: Öğretecek Zaman (feat Sansar Salvo)
- 2018: Yağmur Çocuk (feat Ozan Barış Sanlısoy)
- 2019: Aslında Gülmek Gerek
- 2019: Hep Aklımdasın
- 2019: Gel Dünyama
- 2020: 7 Kişi
- 2021: Kaldım İstanbul'da
- 2021: Geri Dönemem
- 2023: İnan Buna
- 2024: Şarkılar Söyle
