= Diolkides =

Town of ancient Bithynia

Coordinates: 40°43′22″N 29°51′37″E

Diolkides was a town of ancient Bithynia.

Its site is located opposite Zeytin Burnu, Gölcük, in Asiatic Turkey.
