= Soner Canözer =

Turkish composer, musician, and writer

Soner Canozer is a Turkish composer, musician, and writer. He has founded the symphonic rock project Almora in 2001. The albums within this project have been released in Turkey, Japan, Mexico. In 2005, Soner Canözer's songs has been performed in “Revue of Dreams – Jazzy Fairies musical. This musical has been published by TCA Pictures in Japan and abroad.

Canozer's 15 years celebration album called "Masalcinin On Bes Yili - Fifteen Years of the Storyteller" was performed by City of Prague Philharmonic Orchestra. "Albatros Suvarisi - Albatross Cavalry" album has been performed by Budapest Symphony Orchestra. "Hayalperest - Dreamer" album has been performed by Budapest Symphony Orchestra.

== Albums ==
- Hayalperest / Dreamer (Budapest Symphony Orchestra - LP / 2016)
- Albatros Süvarisi / Albatross Cavalry (Budapest Symphony Orchestra - LP / 2014)
- Düş Irmakları / Rivers of Dream (EP / 2012). Cover Art: Leszek Kostuj
- Masalcı'nın On Beş Yılı / Fifteen Years of the Storyteller (City of Prague Philharmonic Orchestra - LP / 2009)
- Kıyamet Senfonisi (LP / 2008)
- 1945 (LP / 2006)
- Shehrazad (LP / 2004)
- Kalihora's Song (LP / 2003)
- Gates of Time (LP / 2002)

== Books and Stories ==
- Atlas Ulusu / Atlas Nation (Novel / 2018)
- Zemheri Sahi'nin Hazinesi / Treasure of Zemheri Shah (Novel / 2017)
- Albatros Süvarisi / Albatross Cavalry (Novel / 2014)
- Almora'nın Öyküsü / The Story of Almora (Short Story / 2002)
- Kalihora'nın Şarkısı / Kalihora's Song (Short Story / 2003)
- Kıyamet Senfonisi / The Judgement Symphony (Short Story / 2008)
- Okyanus Perisi / The Ocean Fairy (Short Story / 2009)
