= Değirmendere Merkez, Gölcük =

Değirmendere Merkez
- Neighbourhood
- Location in Turkey Değirmendere Merkez (Marmara)
- Coordinates: 40°43′17″N 29°46′59″E
- Country: Turkey
- Province: Kocaeli
- District: Gölcük
- Population (2022): 6,226
- Time zone: UTC+3 (TRT)

Değirmendere Merkez is a neighbourhood in the municipality and district of Gölcük, Kocaeli Province, Turkey. Its population is 6,226 (2022). Değirmendere was an independent municipality until it was merged into the municipality of Gölcük in 2008. The town is located on the south coast of Izmit Bay, between Gölcük and Halidere. It was the epicenter of the 1999 Marmara earthquake that almost wiped out the town as well as neighboring towns. Değirmendere is well known for its hazelnuts, sweet cherries, and public cultural activities.
