= Ogün =

Ogün is a Turkish given name for males. People named Ogün include:

- Ogün Altıparmak (1938–2025), Turkish footballer
- Ogün Özçiçek (born 1999), Turkish footballer
- Ogün Samast, Turkish ultra-nationalist
- Ogün Sanlısoy (born 1971), Turkish rock musician
- Ogün Temizkanoğlu (born 1969), Turkish footballer
