= Almôra =

- Origin: Istanbul, Turkey
- Genres: Symphonic metal, folk metal, gothic metal
- Years active: 2001–present
- Labels: Zihni Müzik; Esen Plak/Eznora Music
- Members: Soner Canözer
- Website: www.almora.net

Almôra is a one-man Turkish symphonic/gothic metal project, maintained by Soner Canözer.

== History ==
Almôra was founded in 2001 as a musical project of Turkish musician Soner Canözer. After the release of the EP Standing Still & Cyrano they published their debut album, Gates of Time, in 2002 on the Turkish label Zihni Müzik. The follow-up album, Kalihora's Song, was released in 2003 and also received attention abroad.

The release of their third studio album, Shehrâzad, in 2004 was followed by positive reactions from all over the world. The newspaper Milliyet and Blue Jean magazine referred to it as one of the five best Turkish rock albums ever. Particularly in Japan the album got recognized and two songs were even included in the musical Jazzy Fairies/Revue of Dreams by the popular Japanese theater group Takarazuka Revue.

In 2006 the band released their fourth studio album, 1945, in collaboration with the Turkish opera tenor Hakan Aysev. In 2008 it was followed by their latest album, Kıyamet Senfonisi, which features a guest appearance of the Turkish rock musician Ogün Sanlısoy.

== Singles and albums released in Turkey ==
- Gates of Time (album 2002)
- "Standing Still" & "Cyrano" (single 2002)
- Kalihora's Song (album 2003)
- Shehrazad (album 2004)
- 1945 (album 2006)
- "Cehennem Geceleri – Hell Nights" (single 2007)
- Kıyamet Senfonisi – The Symphony of Judgement (album 2008)

== Albums released abroad ==
- Gates of Time / Mexico (Moon Records 2007)
- 1945 / Mexico (Moon Records 2006)
- 1945 / Japan (M&I Records 2006)
- Kalihora's Song / Mexico (Moon Records 2006)
- Shehrazad / Mexico (Moon Records 2006)
- Shehrazad / Japan (M&I Records 2005)

== Video clips ==
- Shehrazad (Shehrazad album)
- Cehennem Geceleri – Hell Nights (Cehennem Geceleri Single 2007 )
- Su Masalı – The River's Tale (Kıyamet Senfonisi album – The Symphony of Judgement )
- Kıyamet Senfonisi Albüm Kayıt Belgeseli (The Symphony of Judgement album recording sessions)
- Tılsım – Talisman (Kıyamet Senfonisi album – The Symphony of Judgement )
