= Unspoken (Pentagram album) =

Studio album by Mezarkabul
- Released: September 2001
- Recorded: 2001
- Studios: Sierra Studios, Athens
- Genre: Heavy metal
- Length: 63:33
- Labels: Sanctuary; Noise (international)

Mezarkabul chronology
Popçular Dışarı (1997)	Unspoken (2001)	Bir (2002)

Unspoken, released in 2001, is the fifth album by Mezarkabul. In Turkey, the band was still known as Pentagram. The album was recorded at Sierra Studios in Athens. The band signed with Sanctuary Records and was marketed as Mezarkabul outside Turkey.

In 2008, the album was re-released by Sony BMG together with the rest of Mezarkabul's back catalogue until then.

== Reception ==
Rock Hard bestowed the grade 8.5 out of 10 upon Unspoken. Metal.de gave a more modest review, 7 out of 10, deducting points for "the often somewhat boring melodies". The vocals were "excellent", and there were "some great songs that give the whole album the right boost to lift Mezarkabul from mediocrity". Powermetal.de praised the songwriting, giving the band a varied style with appropriate amounts of experimentation. The self-titled instrumental track was "particularly noteworthy" and one of the standout songs on the album. With more aggressive vocals, the reviewer noted, Unspoken would have reached the rank of "a top album".

While the music contained a few "Eastern" elements "from the former Ottoman Empire", the band did not "try to force all the songs to have a Turkish flair". In addition to the "mid-eastern/ Asian oriental influence", Metal Temple noted elements of progressive metal and some melodic death metal, finding the album "simply but amazing". The reviewer for Vampster reckoned that Unspoken also contained traces of Swedish bands such as Hexenhaus, Pathos and Candlemass. The reviewer suspected that a kinship had been formed due to the Turkish cuisine in Sweden exterting a "kebab influence" on the Swedish musicians. All in all, Unspoken was "a really excellent, interesting and timeless metal album" with only one or two duds among the tracks.

== Track listing ==
1. "We Come from Nowhere"
2. "In Esir Like an Eagle"
3. "Unspoken"
4. "Lions in a Cage"
5. "For the One Unchanging"
6. "Mezarkabul" (instrumental)
7. "Take My Time"
8. "Pain"
9. "Puratu"
10. "This Too Will Pass"
11. "For Those Who Died Alone" (instrumental)
