= Bir (Mezarkabul album) =

Studio album by Mezarkabul
- Released: 2002
- Genre: Heavy metal
- Length: 44:08
- Producer: Universal

Mezarkabul chronology
Unspoken (2001)	Bir (2002)	MMXII (2012)

Bir is the fifth studio album by Turkish heavy metal band Mezarkabul (also known as Pentagram). It is the band's first album with all lyrics in Turkish.

== Track listing ==
No.	Title	Length
1.	"Tigris"	1:36
2.	"Bir"	4:05
3.	"Şeytan Bunun Neresinde"	3:00
4.	"Bu Alemi Gören Sensin"	6:36
5.	"Mezarkabul"	7:52
6.	"Sir"	5:05
7.	"Kam"	3:42
8.	"Ölümlü"	5:17
9.	"For Those Who Died Alone"	8:15
Total length:		44:08

== Personnel ==
Pentagram

- Murat İlkan – vocals
- Hakan Utangaç – guitar
- Metin Türkcan – guitar
- Tarkan Gözübüyük – bass guitars
- Cenk Ünnü – drums
