= Bağgöze, Eruh =

Village in Siirt Province, Turkey

Bağgöze
- Village
- Location within Turkey
- Coordinates: 37.711°N 41.917°E
- Country: Turkey
- Province: Siirt
- District: Eruh
- Population (2021): 523
- Time zone: UTC+3 (TRT)

Bağgöze (Kurdish: Ayne) is a village in the Eruh District of Siirt Province in Turkey. The village is populated by Kurds of the Jilyan tribe and had a population of 523 in 2021.

== Name ==
Bağgöze means literally "garden spring" (Turkish: bağ, "garden, orchard, vineyard," + göze, "spring, water source").

In a list compiled by the Turkish government in 1928, the village's name is given as Lodi or لادى. In a 1968 list, the name is given as Bağgöze, with a note that the previous name was Ayni.

== History ==
In 1948, the village (then called Lodi) included a primary school and a "people's room" (halk odası).

== Notable natives ==
Sheikh Muhammed Ayni was born in the village and provided spiritual guidance there and in the village of Basret (İnceler). Before his death, he requested that his children and followers bury him on a hill near the village in a tomb open to the sky with a terebinth tree planted in the tomb. He died in 1859. The villagers are reported to have built a domed tomb over his grave; the dome collapsed, was rebuilt, and collapsed again; so finally, they obeyed. The terebinth tree can still be seen over the grave.
