= Mezarkabul =

Turkish metal band

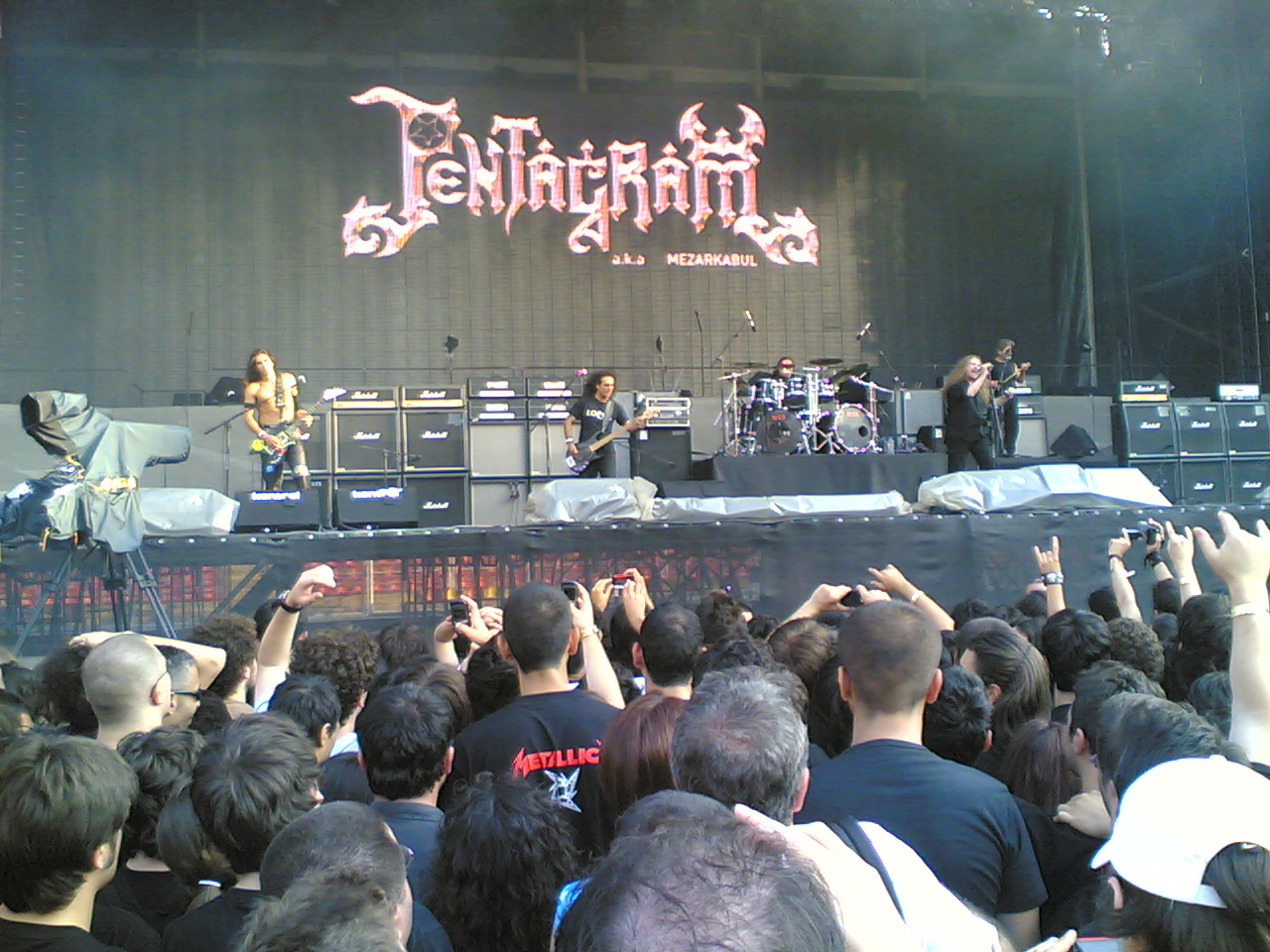
- Pentagram's performance in 2008

Background information
- Also known as: Pentagram
- Origin: Istanbul, Turkey
- Genres: Heavy metal, progressive metal, folk metal, thrash metal (early)
- Years active: 1986–present
- Labels: RMP/Nuclear Blast, Noise, Century Media, Sanctuary, Nepa Müzik, Raks Müzik, Böcek Yapim; Sony Music Entertainment (2012–current)
- Members: Hakan Utangaç; Cenk Ünnü; Tarkan Gözübüyük; Demir Demirkan; Ozan Tügen; Gökalp Ergen
- Past members: Engin Tümer; Ümit Yılbar; Murat Net; Ogün Sanlısoy; Bartu Toptaş; Murat İlkan; Metin Türkcan; Onur Pamukçu
- Website: thepentagram.net

Mezarkabul (also known as Pentagram in Turkey) is a Turkish metal band formed by Hakan Utangaç and Cenk Ünnü. Mezarkabul is known for integrating Anatolian elements into their music.

== History ==
Mezarkabul was formed in Istanbul in 1986 by guitarist Hakan Utangaç and drummer Cenk Ünnü. In 1987, bassist Tarkan Gözübüyük joined, and they started doing live shows. Their first show was performed at a wedding hall in Istanbul, Bağcılar. Tarkan Gozubuyuk could not make it to the concert and instead Ozgunay Unal joined the line up for the concert. By the time they made to their fifth song most of chairs and tables had been destroyed by the audience. Turkey was meeting metal music and by their crazy emotions this chaotic action happened. Their first songs were released in 1990 on the self-titled Pentagram album. In 1992, a second guitarist Demir Demirkan joined the band, as well as a new lead singer, Bartu Toptas, helping Hakan to concentrate on his guitar duties. The new line-up played several gigs until Bartu decided to move back to Sweden. He left the band in March 1992 just when they had started to record the Trail Blazer album. The voice in the beginning of "Secret Missile" is Bartu's. To fill Bartu's void, the Mezarkabul members hired vocalist Ogün Sanlısoy. They released their second album Trail Blazer in the same year and enjoyed growing popularity, both in Turkey and across the world. In 1993 guitarist Ümit Yılbar was killed by terrorists on the mountain of Cıraf while he was serving the Turkish army. The remaining members recorded "Fly Forever" in memory of Ümit Yılbar, but the band recorded more songs that dealt with Yılbar's death: "1,000 in the Eastland" and "Anatolia" (both from the album Anatolia).

For the next three years, the band toured in Turkey and other countries. In 1995, vocalist Murat İlkan replaced Ogün, and they started working on their next album, Anatolia, which was released in Turkey in 1997. Several weeks after the release, Century Media approached Mezarkabul for a worldwide release. The lyrics of Anatolia addressed war, pain and ignorance, often in an unusual way. In "1,000 in the Eastland" the lyrics stress that "thousands of people are dying in the East, all ignored by the West, where one death becomes a tragedy", at the same time emphasizing that "fighting with hatred feeds the rich men". The album has been praised by Sea of Tranquility.

They released a live album in 1997 titled Popçular Dışarı (‘Pop Singers Out’). Guitarist Demir Demirkan departed, and was temporarily replaced with Onur "Mr.Cat" Pamukcu.

The band started recording its next album in 2000 in its own studio in Istanbul. Guitarist Metin Türkcan officially joined the band during the recording session. They composed 17 songs, and decided to split it into two different CDs. In 2001, Unspoken was released worldwide. In 2002, Bir was released in Turkey.

For their releases in Turkey, they use the name "Pentagram". However, due to an American doom metal band called Pentagram, they go by the name "Mezarkabul" for international releases.

Sony Music released in 2008 Mezarkabul's concert album 1987, which includes the band's 20th anniversary concert in Bostancı Gösteri Merkezi on 4 February 2007.

The band celebrated their 25th year with their album MMXII. In 2014 they released their live album "Live MMXII" which consisted of live performances of the band since 2012.

In 2017, past members Demir Demirkan, Ogün Sanlısoy and Murat İlkan rejoined the band for their 30th anniversary release "Akustik" where Turkish musician Şebnem Ferah features as well. They also played live shows as an octet with acoustic instruments, before reverting to electric instruments. The band usually plays live shows as a septet; with Demir only occasionally appearing in live shows, however it has been confirmed on Demir's Instagram page that he will feature on their upcoming album.

With the reunited members, the band released the first single Bu Düzen Yıkılsın on digital music platforms on 30 October 2020 and a video clip of the song was released on YouTube on 1 November 2020. On 29 January and 4 June 2022 respectively, "Sur" and "Pride" were released on music and video platforms. On 9 September 2022 Makina Elektrika their newest album released.

In 2023 the band managed to play at the Turock Festival in Bochum, as well as 2 headlining shows in Cologne and Berlin. They are still creative and plan to bring out a new album in 2025.

== Influence on Turkish music ==
Mezarkabul is often considered to be the pioneers of heavy metal in Turkey. The band's work has inspired all forms of rock music and helped it to gain popularity in Turkey. They were known to collaborate with the late vocalist of Vitamin, Gökhan Semiz, and Vitamin itself. Also, Tarkan Gözübüyük has produced, arranged and performed with numerous artists and bands. Early examples of his work as a contributing artist includes Şebnem Ferah's debut album titled Kadın which was a success in Turkey. Later on in 2005, Gözübüyük produced Ferah's album titled Can Kırıkları. Another example, Mor ve Ötesi's groundbreaking album Dünya Yalan Söylüyor was produced by Gözübüyük. In addition to contributions to rock music, Mezarkabul members have contributed to popular music as well. Demir Demirkan, as he pursued his solo career, wrote the lyrics and produced the first Turkish song ever to win the Eurovision song contest. Tuna Kiremitçi, of the Vatan newspaper, wrote an article about the band, praising their contributions.

== Members ==
=== Current members ===
- Hakan Utangaç – rhythm guitar, vocals (1986–present), lead vocals (1986–1990)
- Cenk Ünnü – drums (1986–present)
- Tarkan Gözübüyük – bass guitar, backing vocals (1987–present)
- Demir Demirkan – lead guitar (1990–1992, 1996–1998, 2017–present)
- Ozan Tügen – keyboards (2008, 2010–present), guitars, cura, backing vocals (2017–present)
- Gökalp Ergen – lead vocals (2010–present), occasional acoustic guitar (2017–present)

=== Former members ===
- Engin Tümer – lead guitar (1988)
- Ümit Yılbar – lead guitar (1988–1989)
- Burak Kalaycı – lead guitar (1989)
- Murat Net – lead guitar (1989–1990)
- Bartu Toptaş – lead vocals (1990–1992)
- Ogün Sanlısoy - lead vocals (1992-1995/2017-2026)
- Metin Türkcan - lead guitar (1992/1993-1996/2000-2026)
- Murat İlkan - lead vocals (1995-2010/2017-2026)
- İhsan Şen – lead guitar (1992–1993)
- Onur "Mr. Cat" Pamukçu – lead guitar (1998–2000)

== Discography ==
=== Albums ===
- Pentagram (1990)
- Trail Blazer (1992)
- Anatolia (1997)
- Unspoken (2001)
- Bir (2002)
- MMXII (2012)
- Akustik (2017)
- Makina Elektrika (2022, Sony Music)

=== Live albums ===
- Popçular Dışarı (1997)
- Pentagram 1987 (2008)
- Live MMXIV (2014)
- Akustik (2022/Live at Zorlu PSM 2017)

=== Demo ===
- Live at the Trail (1991)

=== DVD ===
- Pentagram 1987 (2008)
