= Gölcük, Kocaeli =

Gölcük
- District and municipality
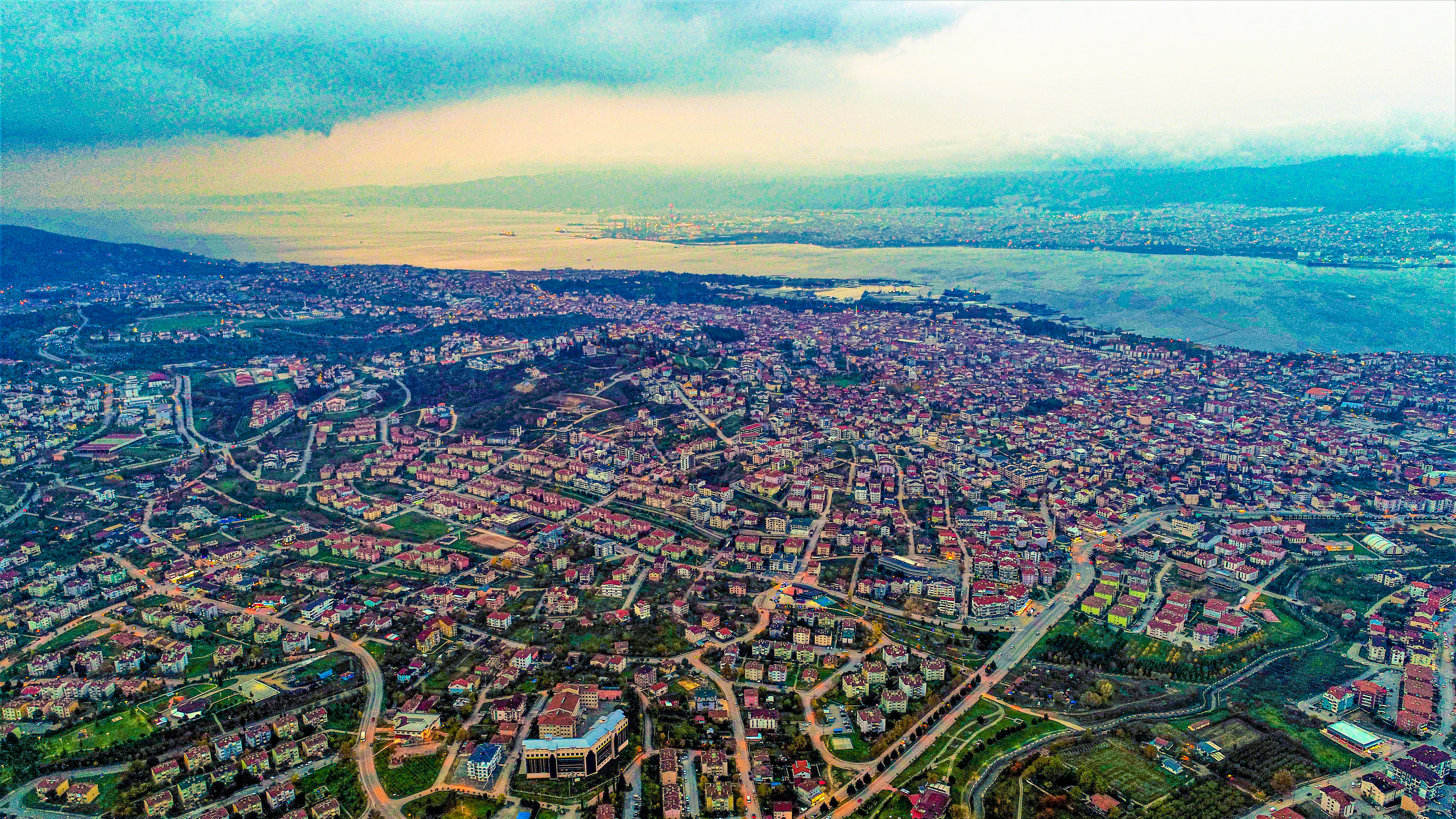

- Logo

- Map showing Gölcük District in Kocaeli Province

- Location within Turkey Location within Marmara
- Coordinates: 40°43′02″N 29°49′22″E
- Country: Turkey
- Province: Kocaeli

Government
  - Mayor: Ali Yıldırım Sezer (AKP)
- Area: 217 km^{2} (84 sq mi)
- Population (2022): 175,940
  - Density: 811/km^{2} (2,100/sq mi)
- Time zone: UTC+3 (TRT)
- Postal code: 41650
- Area code: 0262
- Website: www.golcuk.bel.tr

Gölcük is a municipality and district of Kocaeli Province, Turkey. Its area is 217 km^{2}, and its population is 175,940 (2022). Gölcük is located on the southern shore of the Gulf of İzmit, which is the easternmost inlet of the Sea of Marmara.

Gölcük is home to the Gölcük Naval Base and Gölcük Naval Shipyard of the Turkish Navy. A Ford Otosan automobile plant is also located in the district.

== History ==
The historical development of Gölcük started in the region that the ancient Greeks and Romans called Bithynia, which also included the nearby city of İzmit (ancient Nicomedia) and its surroundings. It is thought that Gölcük was historically known as Diolkides (Diolkídis in classical antiquity).

In the late Ottoman period, 21 out of the 24 villages within the borders of present-day Gölcük district (except for the Halıdere, Ulaşlı and Yazlık villages) were administered by the Bahçecik Sub-district Directorate of the Sanjak of Kocaeli.

Georgian Muslims from the Adjara region fleeing the Russian conquest of the Caucasus, especially during the Russo-Turkish War (1877–1878), were settled in the villages of the Samanlı Mountains near Gölcük.

After the proclamation of the Turkish Republic in 1923, the first step for Gölcük to become a garrison city was taken in 1927. The technical need that emerged with the decision to repair the Turkish Navy battlecruiser TCG Yavuz, which was damaged in 1925, led to the establishment of the Gölcük Naval Shipyard. A pool was built in the same year and a floating drydock was purchased. The town center and the Gendarmerie were established in the village of İhsaniye in 1930. The population of Gölcük started to increase rapidly with the arrival of the workers from the shipyards in Istanbul, who were employed for repairing the battlecruiser TCG Yavuz at the Gölcük Naval Shipyard. In the meantime, Gölcük district was established with the law numbered 3012, which was adopted on June 9, 1936 and entered into force on June 15, 1936. Due to the absence of a building suitable for government offices in Gölcük, the district governorship started to work temporarily in the rented buildings in the town of Değirmendere. The Government Mansion, the construction of which was completed in a short time, was opened in 1938 and the offices of the district governorship moved to Gölcük.

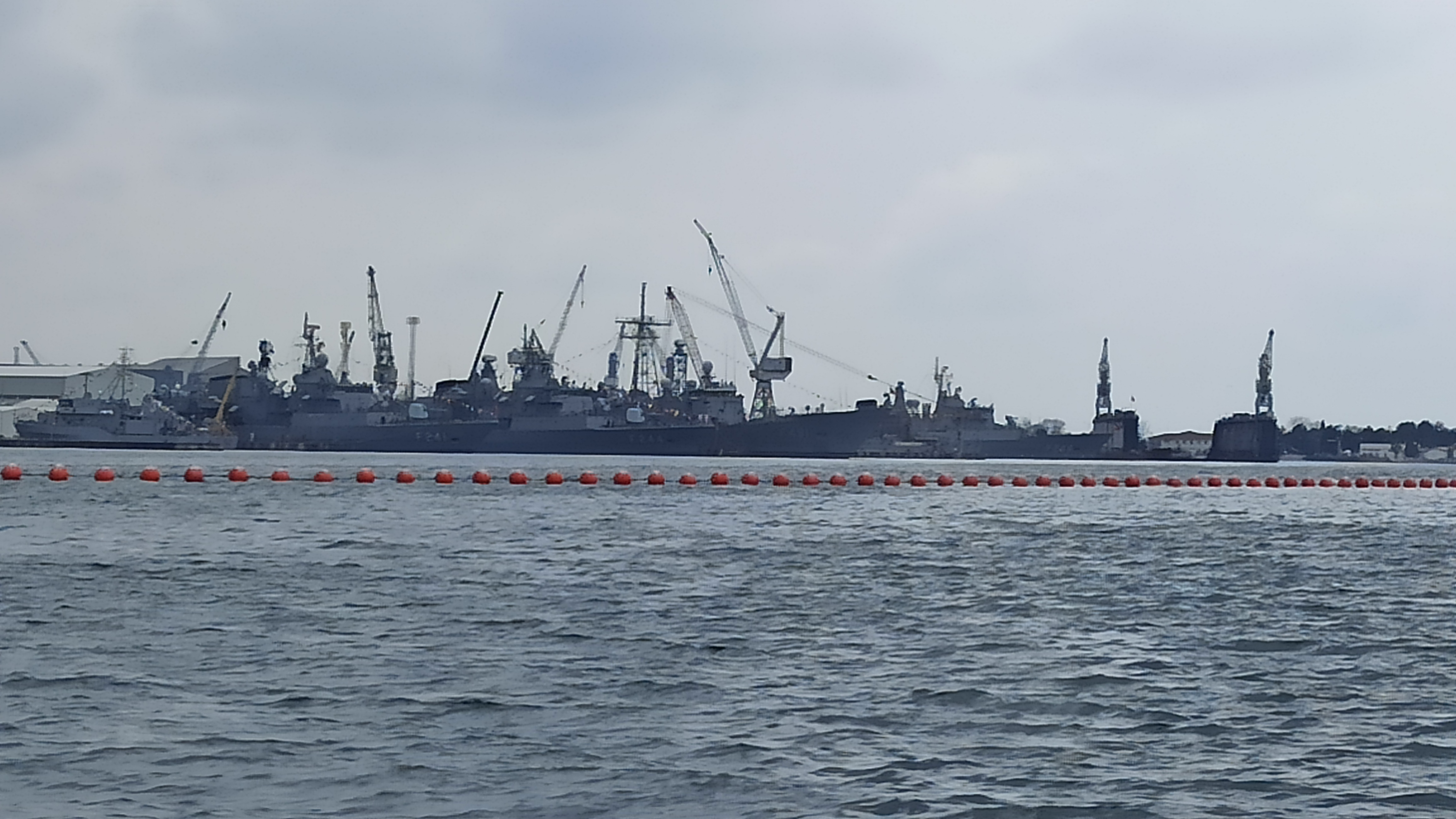
Gölcük Naval Shipyard

Although the fundamental studies for enlarging the Gölcük Naval Shipyard were started in 1938, World War II prevented these works, and the real development and expansion of its facilities began in 1947, especially after Turkey's membership of NATO in 1952. As a result, the population of the town of Gölcük expanded significantly starting from the 1950s.

In the expropriations made with the Special Expropriation Law No. 3887 enacted in 1942, the Government Organization was transferred to Değirmendere in February 1944, with a decision taken by the Provincial General Assembly, since the Government Mansion remained within the expropriation area. After staying in Değirmendere for 10 years, the government moved back to Gölcük in accordance with the law no. 6322 enacted on March 4, 1954.

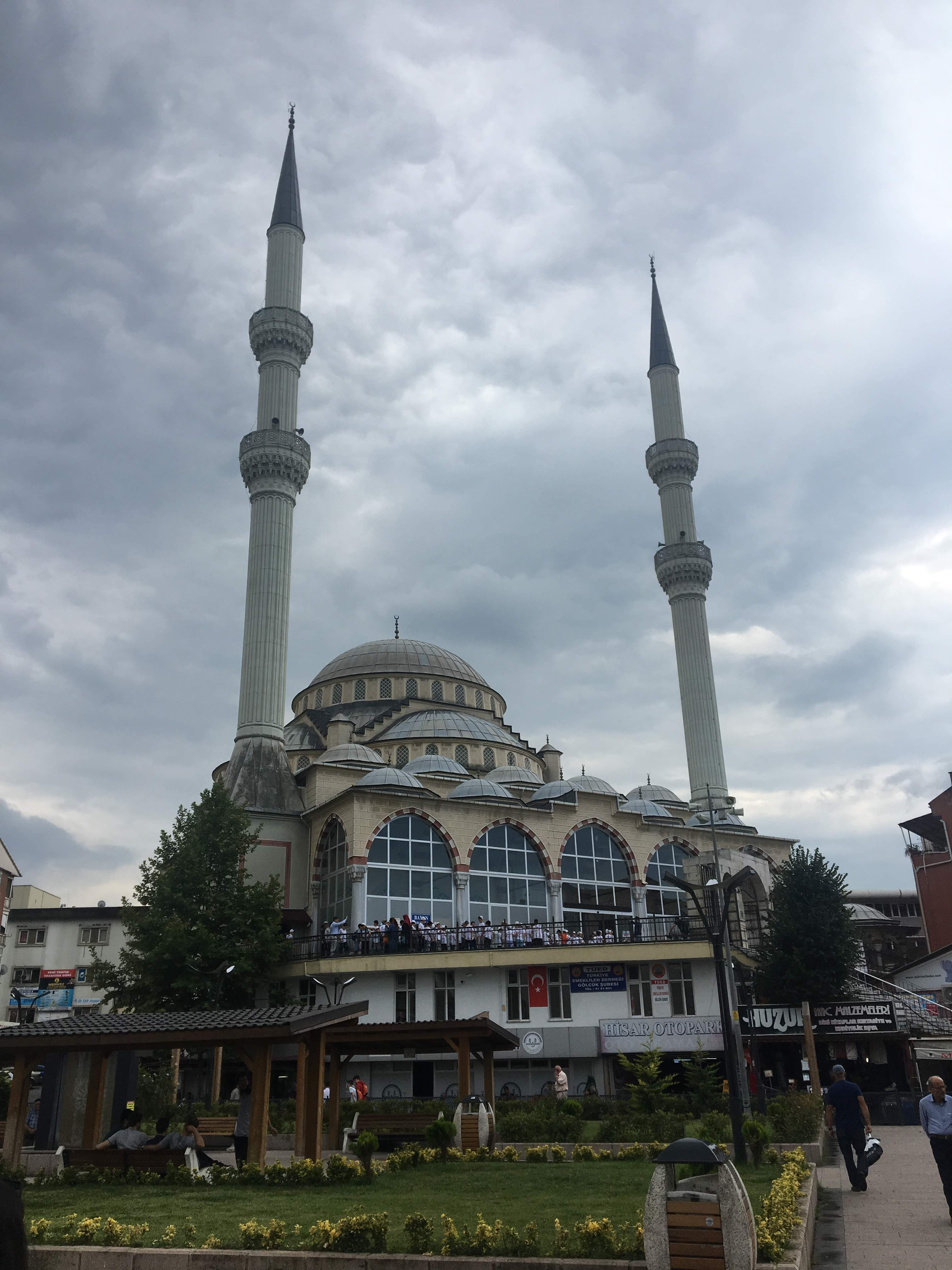
Gölcük Mosque

Following the establishment of the District Governorship of Gölcük, the District and Population Organization and the Police Department were established in Değirmendere. The number of villages in the district of Gölcük was increased to 23 by taking the Halıdere and Ulaşlı villages from the district of Karamürsel. However, with Değirmendere becoming a township, the number of villages decreased to 22. When the Damlar neighbourhood of the Saraylı village became a detached village in 1959, the number of villages in the district of Gölcük increased to 23 again.

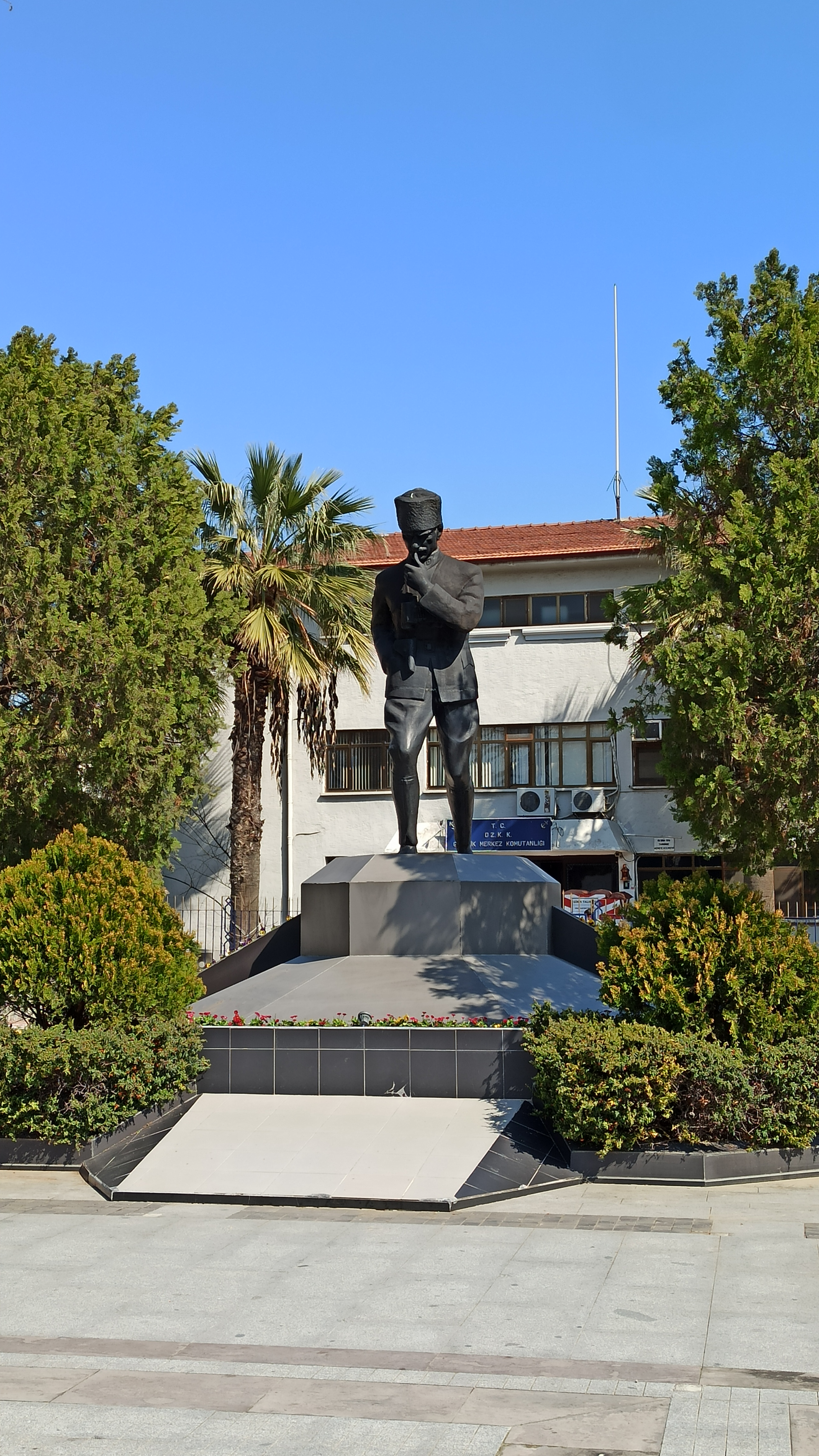
Statue of Mustafa Kemal Atatürk in Gölcük

The Municipality Organization was established in the İhsaniye village with the decision of the Council of Ministers dated 06/09/1966 and numbered 4636. Today, the Gölcük district comprises the town (centrum) of Gölcük and 6 other towns, namely Değirmendere, İhsaniye, Halıdere, Ulaşlı, Hisareyn and Yazlık, as well as a total of 23 villages.

=== 17 August 1999 earthquake ===
The İzmit earthquake of 17 August 1999, which had a moment magnitude of 7.6 M_{w} and a surface-wave magnitude of 7.8 M_{s} had its epicenter in Gölcük and caused severe damage in the eastern part of the Marmara Region. According to official figures, at least 18,373 people died and 48,901 people were injured during the earthquake, and 5,840 people are missing. At least 155 deaths were associated with the tsunami. The damage was estimated at between $12 billion and $20 billion (in 1999 U.S. dollars) according to various sources such as the World Bank. Reports from September 1999 stated 127,251 buildings were damaged to varying extents and at least 60,434 others collapsed, while an American Red Cross report from 2003 estimated that 320,000 homes and businesses were destroyed. More than 250,000 people became homeless. Many people who experienced the earthquake in a wide geographical area were psychologically affected by the trauma.

== Composition ==
There are 54 neighbourhoods in Gölcük District:

- Ayvazpınarı
- Değirmendere-Atatürk
- Değirmendere-Bucak
- Değirmendere-Cumhuriyet
- Değirmendere Merkez
- Değirmendere-Topçular
- Değirmendere-Yalı
- Değirmendere-Yukarı
- Değirmendere-Yüzbaşılar
- Donanma
- Dumlupınar
- Düzağaç
- Eskiferhadiye
- Ferhadiye
- Halıdere-Körfez
- Halıdere-Yalı
- Halıdere-Yeni
- Hamidiye
- Hasaneyn
- Hisareyn
- Hisareyn-Karaköprü
- Hisareyn-Merkez
- İcadiye
- İhsaniye
- İhsaniye-Çiftlik
- İhsaniye-Denizevler
- İhsaniye-Merkez
- İpekyolu
- İrşadiye
- Kavaklı
- Lütfiye
- Mamuriye
- Merkez
- Mesruriye
- Nimetiye
- Nüzhetiye
- Örcün
- Panayır
- Piyalepaşa
- Saraylı
- Şehitler
- Selimiye
- Şevketiye
- Şirinköy
- Siyretiye
- Sofular
- Ulaşlı-Yalı
- Ulaşlı-Yavuz Sultan Selim
- Ümmiye
- Yalı
- Yazlık Merkez
- Yazlık-Yenimahalle
- Yeni Mahalle
- Yunusemre

== See also ==
- Gölcük Naval Base
- Gölcük Naval Shipyard
