= List of hip-hop musicians =

This is a list of notable hip-hop musicians.

== 0–9 ==
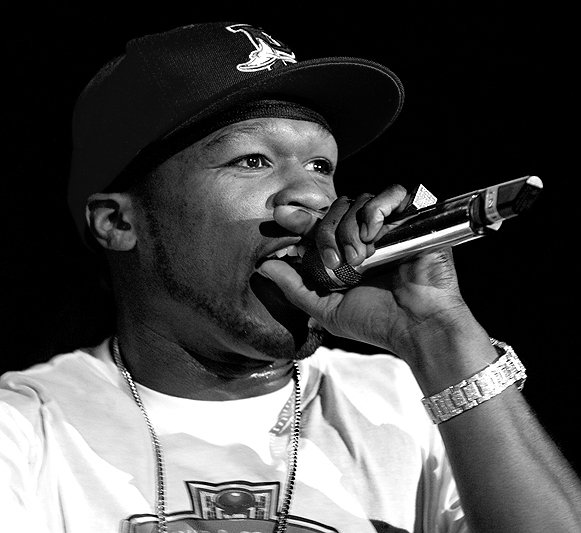
50 Cent

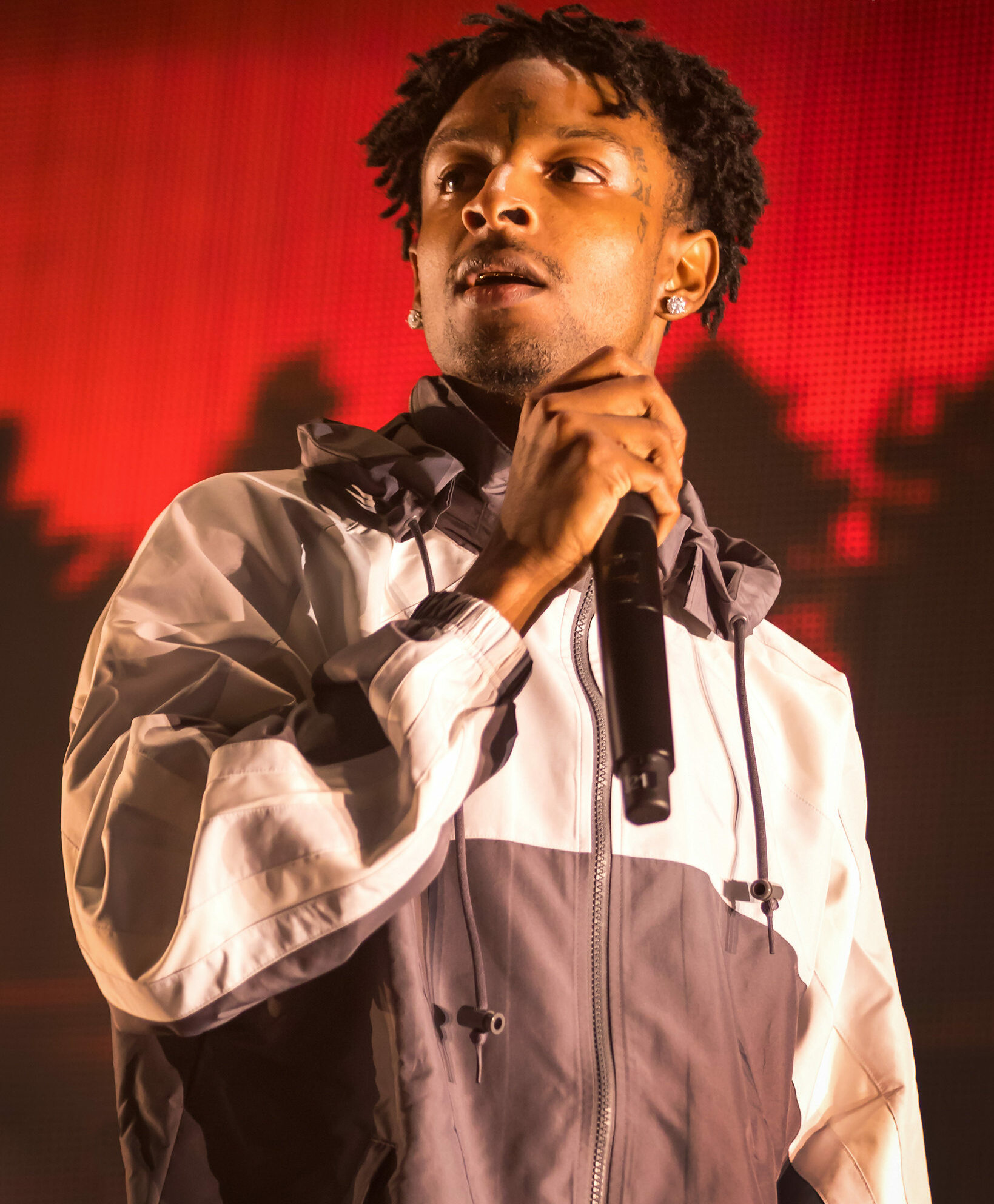
21 Savage

- 03 Greedo
- 070 Shake
- 1.Cuz
- 1nonly
- 12 Gauge
- 12 O'Clock
- 1900Rugrat
- 199X
- 2 Black 2 Strong
- 2 Chainz
- 2 Pistols
- 2hollis
- 2Slimey
- 2Sdxrt3all
- 20syl
- 21 Savage
- 22Gz
- 24hrs
- 24kGoldn
- 25K
- 2Baba
- 2Mex
- 2Rare
- 3Breezy
- 3robi
- 30 Roc
- 310babii
- 347aidan
- 360
- 38 Spesh
- 3D Na'Tee
- 40
- 40 Cal.
- 40 Glocc
- 42 Dugg
- 454
- 4Batz
- 4th Disciple
- 5ft
- 50 Cent
- 6 Dogs
- 60 Second Assassin
- 645AR
- 6arelyhuman
- 6ix
- 6ix9ine
- 6lack
- 7liwa
- 808Melo
- 80purppp
- 88Camino
- 88-Keys
- 9ice
- 9lives
- 9lokkNine
- 9m88
- 9th Prince
- 9th Wonder

== A ==
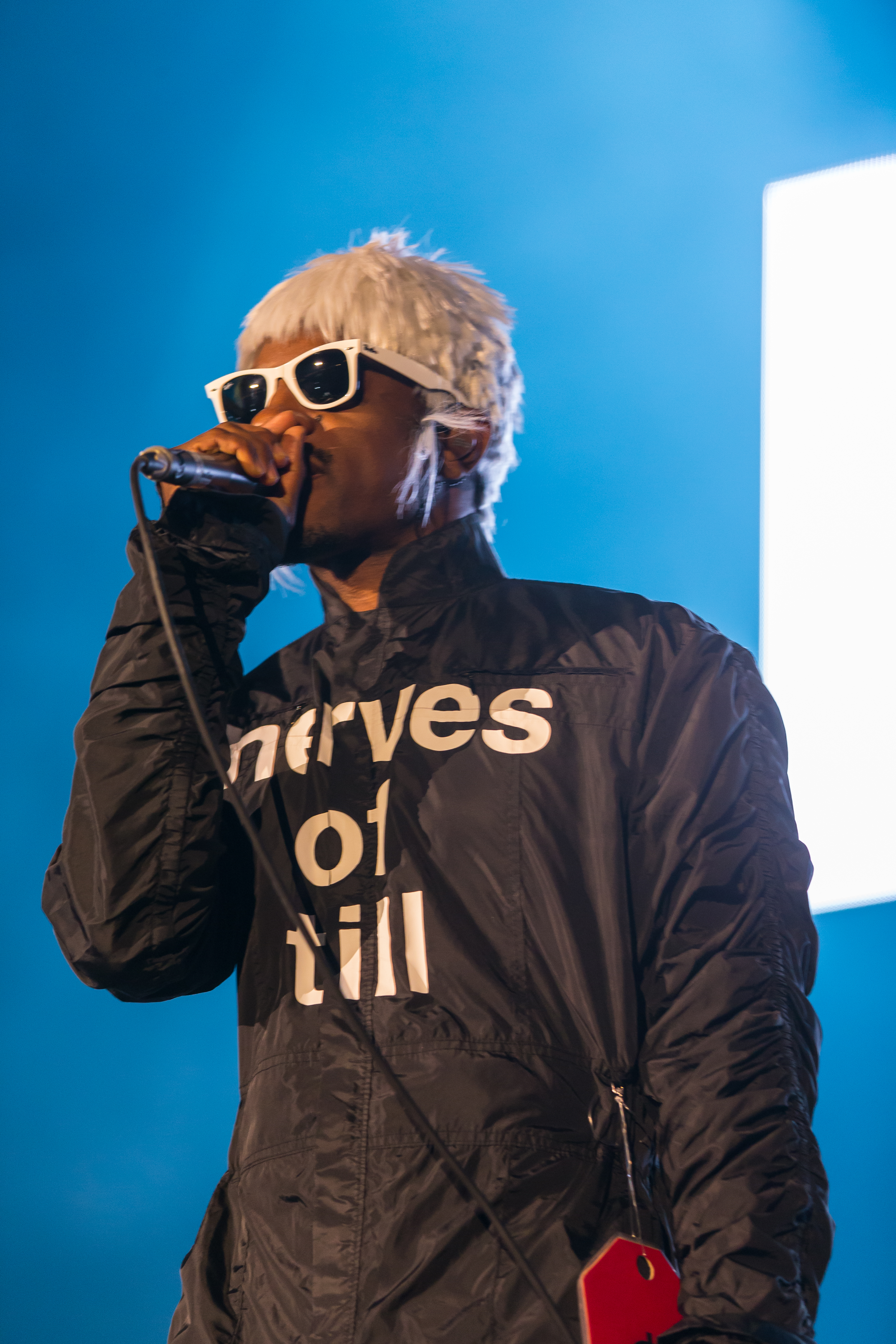
André 3000

- A36
- A Boogie wit da Hoodie
- A+
- A. Chal
- A.D.O.R.
- A.L.T.
- A-Plus
- A-Q
- A-Reece
- A-Trak
- Aaliyah
- Aaron Carter
- Aaron Cohen
- Aaron Cole
- Aaron May
- Ab-Soul
- Abbas Kubaff
- Abd al Malik
- Abena Rockstar
- Abdominal
- Abhi the Nomad
- Abigail Asante
- Aboubakr Bensaihi
- Abra (rapper)
- Abra (singer)
- Abra Cadabra
- Abradab
- Abraham Mateo
- Abstract Rude
- Ace Hood
- AcebergTM
- Aceyalone
- Achille Lauro
- Action Bronson
- Ad-Rock
- Adaam
- Adam Calhoun
- Adam Ro
- Adam Saleh
- Adam Tensta
- Adamn Killa
- Adán Zapata
- Add-2
- Adeem
- Ademo
- Adil Omar
- Admiral T
- Adrian Julius Tillmann
- Adrian Marcel
- Aesja
- Aesop Rock
- Affion Crockett
- Afrika Baby Bam
- Afrika Bambaataa
- Afrikan Boy
- Afrob
- Afroman
- Afu-Ra
- Agallah
- Aggro Santos
- Agus Padilla
- Aha Gazelle
- Ahmad
- Ahn Byeong-woong
- Aidan Davis
- Ai
- Aid
- Aina More
- Aitch
- AJ Tracey
- Aja
- Ajs Nigrutin
- AK Ausserkontrolle
- AK the Savior
- AKA
- Akai Osei
- Akala
- Akari Hayami
- Akheim Allen
- Akhenaton
- Akillezz
- Akintoye
- Akinyele
- Akir
- Akiva Schaffer
- Akon
- Akriila
- Akrobatik
- Akua Naru
- Ak'Sent
- Al B. Sure!
- Al James
- Al Kapone
- Al Sherrod Lambert
- The Alchemist
- Alemán
- Alex Wiley
- Alexander Yakovlev
- Alexandra Reid
- Alfa
- Alfa Mist
- L'Algérino
- Ali
- Ali Jones
- Ali Gul Pir
- Ali Shaheed Muhammad
- Ali Tabatabaee
- Ali Vegas
- Alias
- Alibi Montana
- Alison Goldfrapp
- Aliyah's Interlude
- Alizzz
- All Ok
- Allâme
- Allan Kingdom
- ALLBLACK
- Allday
- Alligatoah
- Almighty
- Almighty Jay
- Aloe Blacc
- Alonzo
- Alpa Gun
- Alpha Ojini
- Alpha P
- Alpha Wann
- Alrad Lewis
- Alvin Risk
- Alyona Alyona
- AMG
- Amanda Blank
- The Ambassador
- Amber Liu
- Ambush Buzzworl
- Ameer Vann
- Amerado
- Amerie
- Amil
- Aminé
- Amir Almuarri
- Amir Obè
- Amir Tataloo
- Amira Unplugged
- AmirSaysNothing
- Ampichino
- Amplify Dot
- AmpLive
- Amy Harvey
- Ana Diaz
- Anas Basbousi
- Anatii
- Anderson .Paak
- André 3000
- Andre Blaze
- Andre Harrell
- Andre Nickatina
- Andrey Batt
- Andro
- Andy Milonakis
- Andy Mineo
- Andy Samberg
- Angel
- Angel Haze
- Angie Martinez
- Anhayla
- Ani Hoang
- Aniff Akinola
- Anike
- Anıl Piyancı
- Anis Don Demina
- Anitta
- Ankerstjerne
- Ann Marie
- Anna
- Anotha Level
- Ant
- Ant Banks
- Ant Wan
- Antimc
- Antix
- Antoinette
- Antwon
- Anycia
- Anuel AA
- Anybody Killa
- Aone Beats
- AP
- AP Dhillon
- Apache
- Apache 207
- Apathy
- apl.de.ap
- Apollo Brown
- Applejaxx
- Aqil Davidson
- AR Paisley
- AR-Ab
- AraabMuzik
- Arabian Prince
- Arca
- Arcángel
- Archie Eversole
- Arden Jones
- Ari Lennox
- Arif Zahir
- Ariie West
- Arivu
- Arizona Zervas
- Arkano
- Arkatech Beatz
- Armani White
- Aron
- Aron Can
- ArrDee
- Arthur Dubois
- Artie 5ive
- Artyom Kacher
- ARTZ
- Arz
- Asake
- ASAP Ferg
- ASAP Nast
- ASAP Rocky
- ASAP Twelvyy
- ASAP TyY
- ASAP Yams
- Ash Island
- Ashanti
- Asher Roth
- Asheru
- Ashnikko
- Asaiah Ziv
- Asian Doll
- Aston Matthews
- Astro
- Astronautalis
- Asuquomo
- Atari Blitzkrieg
- Ateyaba
- ATL Jacob
- Attrell Cordes
- The Audible Doctor
- Audra the Rapper
- Audrey Nuna
- August 08
- August Alsina
- Austin Gunn
- Autumn
- Avelino
- Awich
- Awkwafina
- Awol One
- Axel Foley
- Ayesha Erotica
- AZ
- Azad
- AzChike
- Azealia Banks
- Azet

== B ==
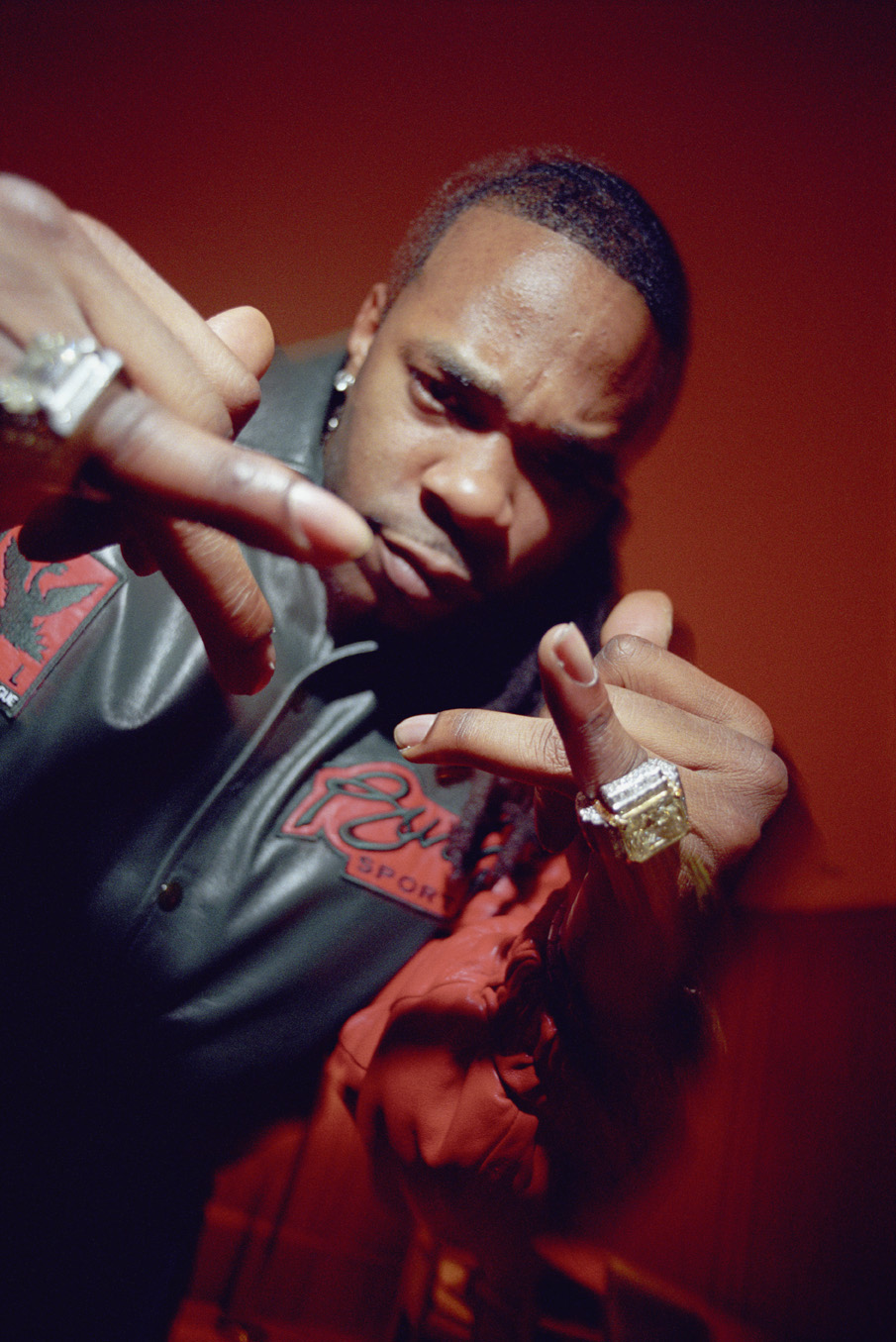
Busta Rhymes

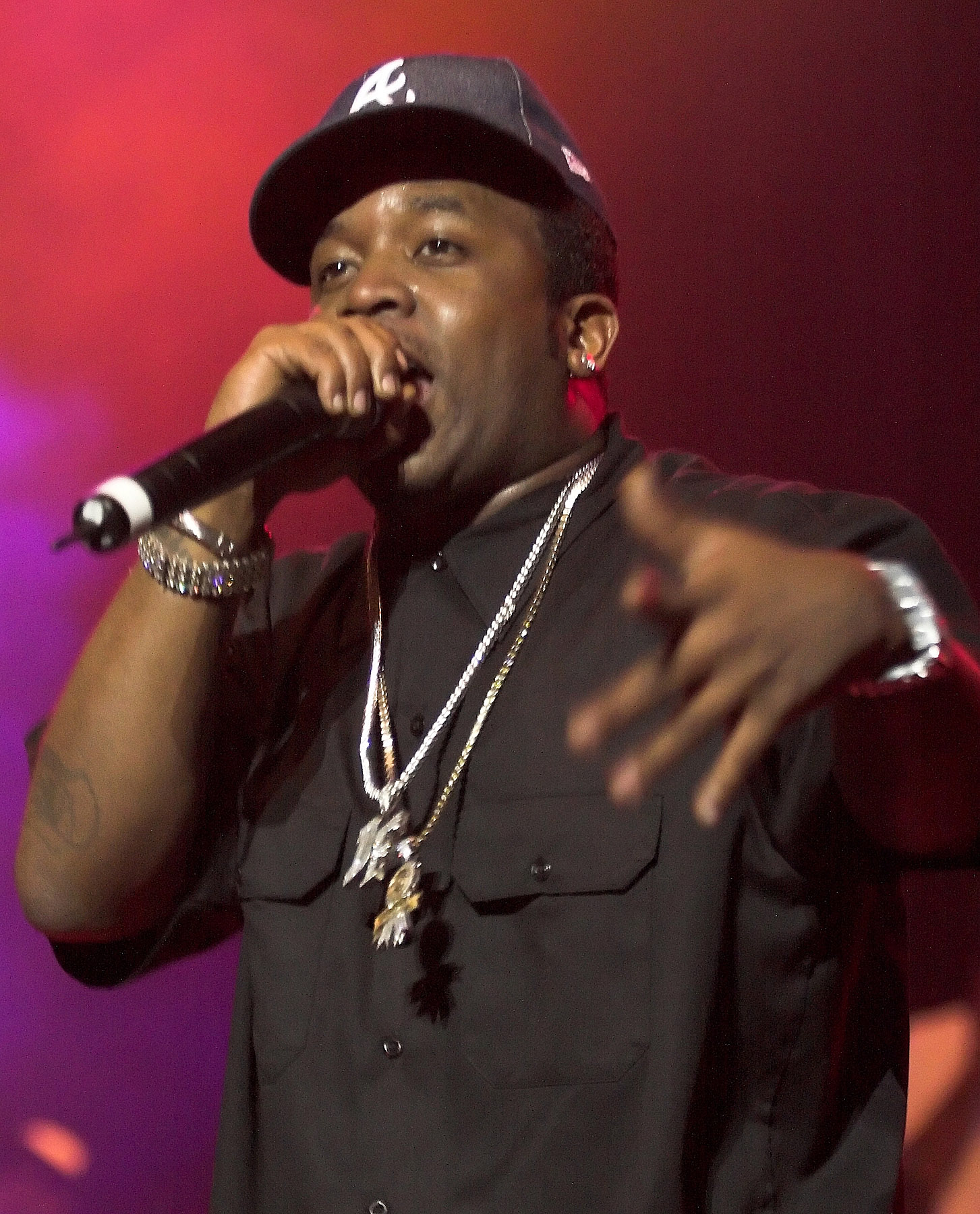
Big Boi

- B Wise
- B Young
- B-Legit
- B-Lovee
- B-Real
- B-Tight
- B'Flow
- B. Cooper
- B. Dolan
- B. Smyth
- B.G.
- B.G., the Prince of Rap
- B.G. Knocc Out
- B.o.B
- Baauer
- Baba Saad
- Baba Sehgal
- BabiBoi
- Baby Bash
- Baby Boy da Prince
- Baby D
- Baby Gang
- Baby Jay
- Baby Keem
- Baby Money
- Baby Smoove
- Baby Tate
- BabyChiefDoit
- Babyface Ray
- Babyfxce E
- BabyJake
- Babylon
- BabyTron
- Babyxsosa
- Baco Exu do Blues
- Backxwash
- Bad Azz
- Bad Boy Timz
- Bad Bunny
- Bad News Brown
- Badshah
- Baeza
- Bahamadia
- Bahar Dehkordi
- Bahram Nouraei
- Baka Not Nice
- Baka Prase
- Baker Boy
- Balen Shah
- Bali Baby
- Baloji
- BamBam
- Bambaata Marley
- Bamboo
- Bandmanrill
- Bandokay
- Bankrol Hayden
- Bankroll Freddie
- Bankroll Fresh
- Banky W.
- Bang Belushi
- Bangs
- Bardhi
- Barkaa
- Eddie Barnz
- Baro
- Bas
- Basick
- Bassagong
- Bassi Maestro
- Basta
- Batsauce
- Battlecat
- Bausa
- BB Jay
- BB Trickz
- bbno$
- BbyMutha
- B. D. Foxmoor
- Be'O
- Beach Boii
- Beam
- Beanie Sigel
- Beans
- Beat Assailant
- Beat Butcha
- The Beat Bully
- Beau Young Prince
- Bedoes
- Becky G
- Beedie
- Beefy
- Beenzino
- Beetlejuice
- Belén Barenys
- Bella Alubo
- Bella Thorne
- Bello FiGo
- Bello Sisqo
- Belly
- Belly Gang Kushington
- Ben Dupree
- Ben Fero
- Benash
- Benee
- Benjamin Flores Jr.
- Benny Blanco
- Benny Jamz
- Benny the Butcher
- Benzino
- Berkcan Güven
- Berner
- Berwyn
- Betty Boo
- Beyoncé
- Bewhy
- Bez
- Bfb Da Packman
- Bhad Bhabie
- B.I
- Bia
- Bianca Bonnie
- Bibi
- Biel
- Big30
- BigTril
- Big B
- Big Baby Gandhi
- Big Baby Tape
- Big Bank Hank
- Big Body Bes
- Big Boi
- Big Boss Vette
- Big Buff
- Big Daddy Kane
- Big DS
- Big Ed
- Big Fase 100
- Big Freedia
- Big Gipp
- Big H
- Big Hawk
- Big K.R.I.T.
- Big Kuntry King
- Big L
- Big Lean
- Big Lurch
- Big Mello
- Big Mike
- Big Moe
- Big Narstie
- Big Naughty
- Big Noyd
- Big Pokey
- Big Pooh
- Big Pun
- Big Reese
- Big Rube
- Big Scarr
- Big Scoob
- Big Sean
- Big Sha
- Big Shug
- Big Smo
- Big Soto
- Big Syke
- Big Zulu
- Big Zuu
- Bigg D
- Bigg Jus
- Bigidagoe
- BigMama
- BigXthaPlug
- Biig Piig
- Bilal Wahib
- Bill Nass
- Bill Stax
- Billy Drease Williams
- Billy Woods
- Bink
- Binki
- Bipolar Sunshine
- Birdman
- Birdz
- Bishop Lamont
- Bishop Nehru
- Bispo
- Biz Markie
- Bizarrap
- Bizarre
- Bizniz
- Bizzle
- Bizzey
- Bizzy
- Bizzy Bone
- Bizzy Crook
- BJ the Chicago Kid
- Bkorn
- Bktherula
- Blaaze
- Blac Chyna
- Blac Youngsta
- Blacc Zacc
- Black Cobain
- Black M
- Black Milk
- Black Nut
- Black Radical Mk II
- Black the Ripper
- Black Rob
- Black Sherif
- Black Thought
- Blackbear
- Blackie
- Blackmagic
- Blacko
- BlackOwned C-Bone
- Blackway
- Blak Jak
- Blak Twang
- Blade Brown
- Bladee
- Blago White
- Blanco (British rapper)
- Blanco (singer)
- Blanco Brown
- Blaq Poet
- Blaqbonez
- Blaqstarr
- Blaze Ya Dead Homie
- Bleubird
- Blind
- BlocBoy JB
- Blockhead
- Bloo
- Blood Raw
- BloodHound Q50
- Blowfly
- BLP Kosher
- Blu
- Blueface
- Blueprint
- Blxckie
- Blxst
- BM
- Bnyx
- Bobb'e J. Thompson
- Bobbito Garcia
- Bobby
- Bobby Brackins
- Bobby Brown
- Bobby Creekwater
- Bobby Raps
- Bobby Sessions
- Bobby Shmurda
- Bobby Soxer
- Bodega Bamz
- Boef
- Bogdan Titomir
- Bohan Phoenix
- Bohemia
- Boi-1da
- Boi B
- Boity Thulo
- BOJ
- Boldy James
- Bolémvn
- Bone Crusher
- Bones
- Bonez MC
- Booba
- Boogie
- Boondox
- Boosie Badazz
- Boots Riley
- Bootsy Collins
- Borgore
- Borkung Hrangkhawl
- Bosh
- Boslen
- Boss AC
- Bossman
- BossMan Dlow
- Botzy
- Bow Wow
- Boyinaband
- Boy Wonder
- Boys Noize
- Brad Rubinstein
- Braille
- Braintax
- Brakence
- Bramsito
- Brandon T. Jackson
- Brandon Tory
- Brandun DeShay
- Brandy Norwood
- Brasco
- Bree Runway
- Breland
- Brent Faiyaz
- Bresh
- Breskvica
- Brian Ennals
- Brianna Perry
- Bridge
- Brigadier Jerry
- Briggs
- Brinson
- Brisco
- Brodha V
- Brodinski
- Bronx Style Bob
- Bronze Nazareth
- Brooke Candy
- Brotha Lynch Hung
- Brother Ali
- Brother J
- Brother Marquis
- BRS Kash
- Bru-C
- Bryant Myers
- Bryson Gray
- Bryson Tiller
- Buba Corelli
- Bubba Sparxxx
- Buck 65
- Buckshot
- Buckwild
- Buddah Bless
- Buddy
- Bugz
- Bugzy Malone
- Bun B
- Burak King
- Burna Boy
- Busdriver
- Bushido
- Bushwick Bill
- Busta Rhymes
- Busy Bee Starski
- Buta
- Butch Cassidy
- ByLwansta

== C ==
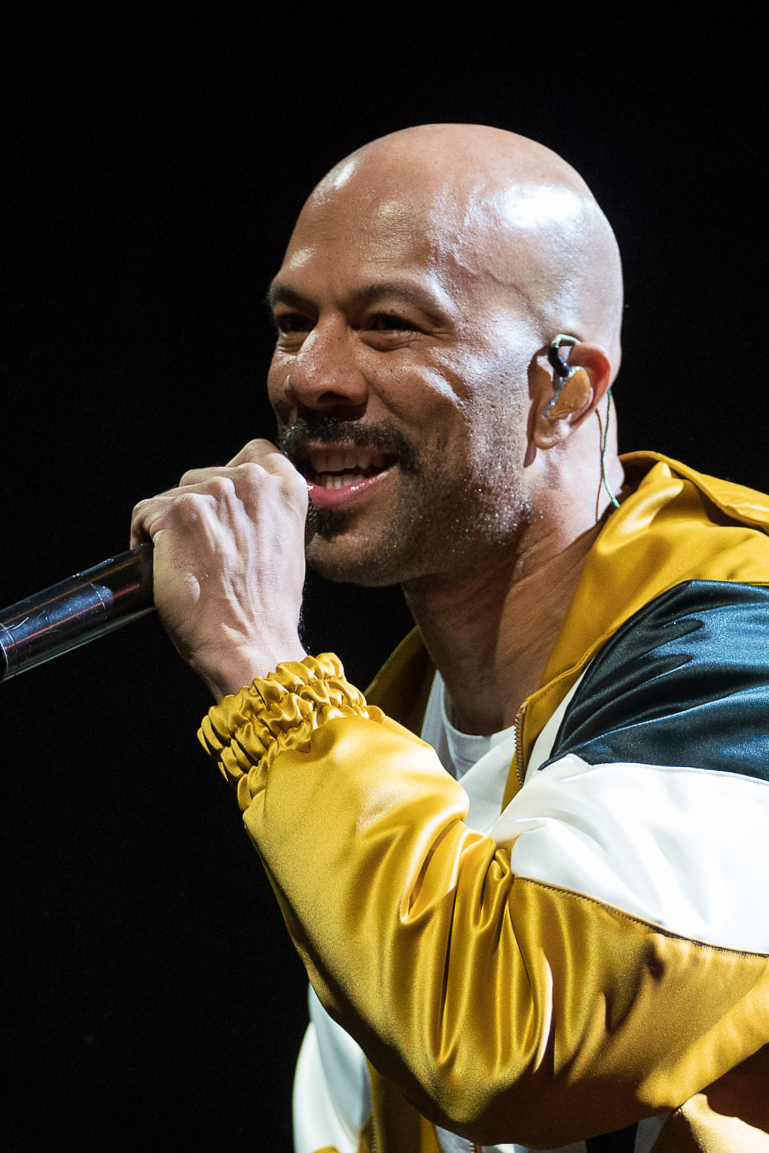
Common

- C-Bo
- C Jamm
- C. Tangana
- C.Gambino
- C. J. Wallace
- C.P Dubb
- C-Murder
- C-Note
- C-Rayz Walz
- Cadence Weapon
- Cadet
- Cage
- Cai Xukun
- Cakes da Killa
- Cal Chuchesta
- Calbo
- Calboy
- Caleb Steph
- Call Me Ace
- Call Me Karizma
- Camara Kambon
- Cam'ron
- Camoflauge
- Camu Tao
- Canardo
- Candy Ken
- Candyman
- Canibus
- Canon
- Canton Jones
- Caparezza
- Capasta
- Capella Grey
- Capital Bra
- Capital Steez
- Capital T
- Capo
- Capo Plaza
- Capone
- Cappadonna
- Cardi B
- Cardiak
- Cardo
- Carl Brave
- Carlon Jeffery
- Carlos Leal
- Carlos Stephens
- Carman
- Carnage
- Casanova
- Casey Veggies
- Cash Cobain
- Cash Out
- Cashis
- Caskey
- Casper
- Cassie Ventura
- Cassidy
- Cassper Nyovest
- Casual
- Cazwell
- Cazzu
- CDQ
- Cecil Otter
- Ced-Gee
- Ceechynaa
- CeeLo Green
- Ceg
- Celaviedmai
- Celestaphone
- Cellski
- Celly Cel
- Celph Titled
- Central Cee
- Cesar Comanche
- Ceschi
- Ceza
- Cezinando
- Corbin
- Chad
- Chad Hugo
- Chad Jones
- Chadia Rodríguez
- Chaeyoung
- Chakuza
- Chali 2na
- Chamillionaire
- Champtown
- Chance the Rapper
- Chanel West Coast
- Changmo
- Chanmina
- Channel 7
- Channel Tres
- Chanyeol
- Charizma
- Charlamagne tha God
- Charles Hamilton
- Charli Baltimore
- Charli XCX
- charlieonnafriday
- Charlie Charles
- Charlie Curtis-Beard
- Charlie Sloth
- Charmaine
- Chase B
- Chaundon
- Chaz French
- Chedda Da Connect
- Che
- Che Noir
- Chef Henny
- Chelsea Jane
- CHEQUE
- Cher Lloyd
- Chester P
- Chester Watson
- Chevy Woods
- Chi Ali
- Chiddy Bang
- Chief Keef
- Chika
- Childish Major
- Chill Rob G
- Chilla Jones
- Chilli
- Chillinit
- Chimbala
- China Mac
- Chingo Bling
- Chingy
- Chinko Ekun
- Chino XL
- Chinx
- Chinx (OS)
- Chip
- Cho
- Choice
- Choiza
- Choker
- Chong Nee
- Choppa
- Chops
- Chopsquad DJ
- Chris Brown
- Chris Kaba
- Chris Landry
- Chris Miles
- Chris Patrick
- Chris Rivers
- Chris Travis
- Chris Webby
- Chris Yonge
- Chrisean Rock
- Christina Aguilera
- Christina Milian
- Christoph The Change
- Chrishan
- Christopher Martin
- Christopher Massey
- Christopher Reid
- Chynna Rogers
- Chyskillz
- Chubb Rock
- Chuck Brown
- Chuck D
- Chuck Inglish
- Chucky Workclothes
- Chunkz
- Chuuwee
- Ciara
- Cico P
- Circus
- Cilvaringz
- Cisco Adler
- Cities Aviv
- Citizen Kay
- City Spud
- CJ
- CJ Fly
- CJ Mac
- CKay
- CL
- CL Smooth
- Clairmont the Second
- Clams Casino
- Clara Lima
- Classified
- Clavish
- Cleo
- Clementino
- Clinton Sparks
- Clyde Carson
- Cobrah
- Cochise
- Coco Jones
- Cody Ko
- Cody Miles
- Coely
- Coez
- Coi Leray
- Coke La Rock
- Coko
- Colette Carr
- Cold 187um
- Colt Ford
- Comethazine
- Common
- Conceited
- Connect-R
- Connor Price
- Consequence
- Contra
- Controller 7
- Conway the Machine
- Coogie
- Cookiee Kawaii
- Cool Breeze
- Cool C
- Cool Calm Pete
- Cool Nutz
- Coolio
- Copywrite
- Cordae
- Cordaro Stewart
- Cormega
- Cortisa Star
- Cory Gunz
- Cosculluela
- Costa Titch
- Cougnut
- Count Bass D
- Cousin Stizz
- Cowboy Troy
- Coyote Beatz
- Cozz
- CPO Boss Hogg
- Craig David
- Craig G
- Craig Mack
- Craig Xen
- Cream
- Crime Boss
- Criminal Manne
- Criolo
- Cro
- Crooked I
- Crucial Star
- Cruel Santino
- Crunchy Black
- Crush
- Crypt the Warchild
- Crystal Caines
- Crystle Lightning
- Cuban Doll
- Cuban Link
- Cui Jian
- Cupcakke
- Currensy
- Curtiss King
- Cut Killer
- CYGO
- Cyhi the Prynce

== D ==
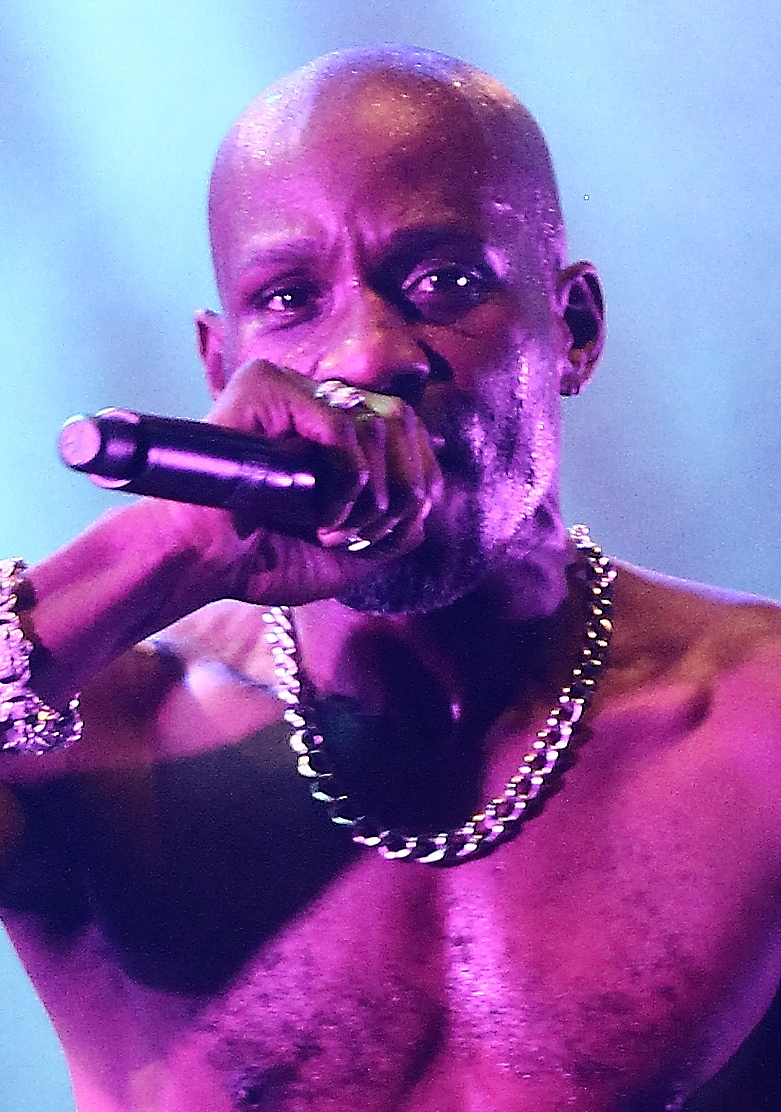
DMX

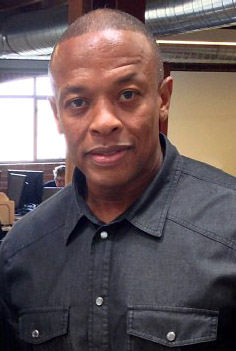
Dr. Dre

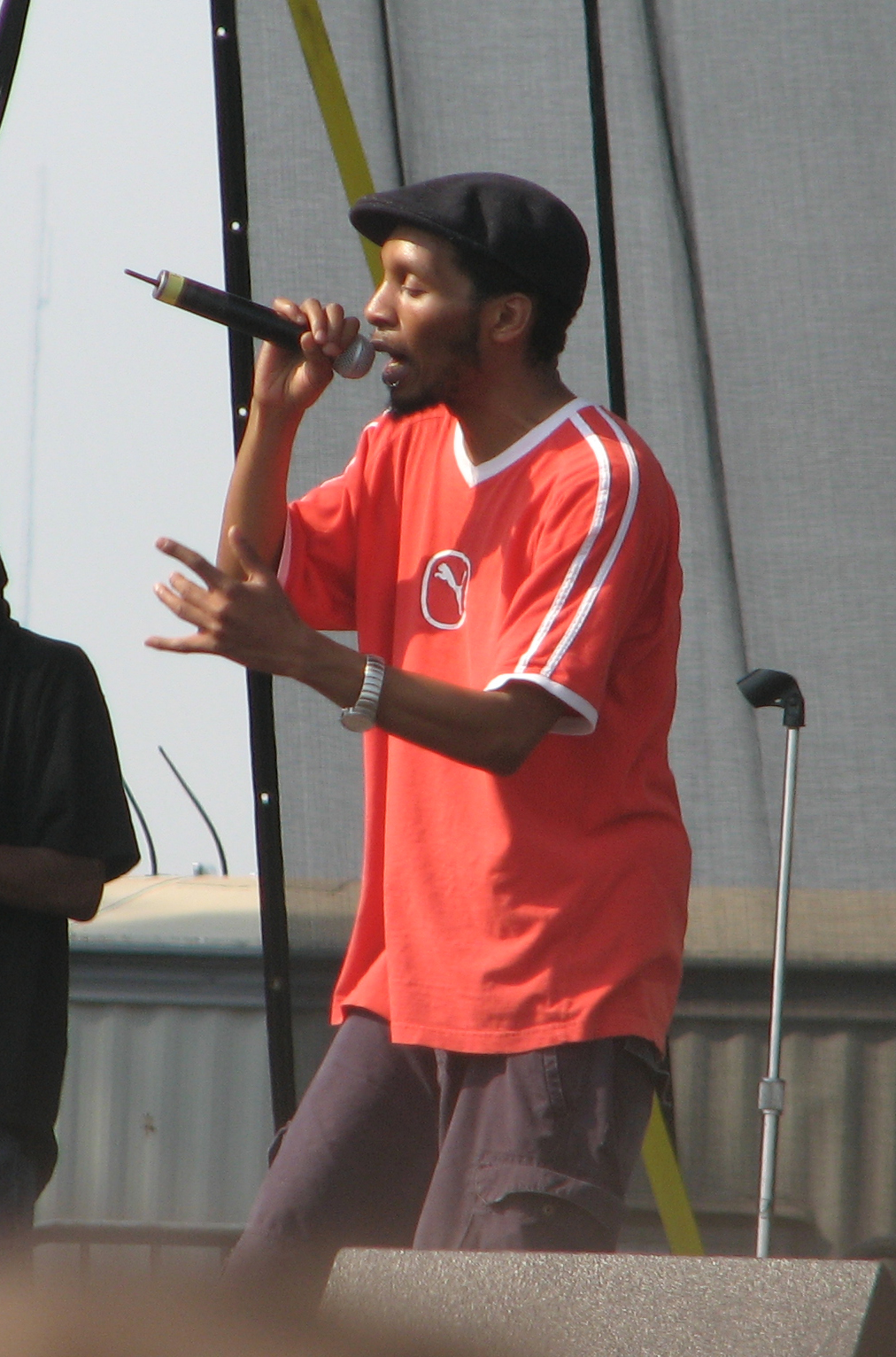
Del the Funky Homosapien

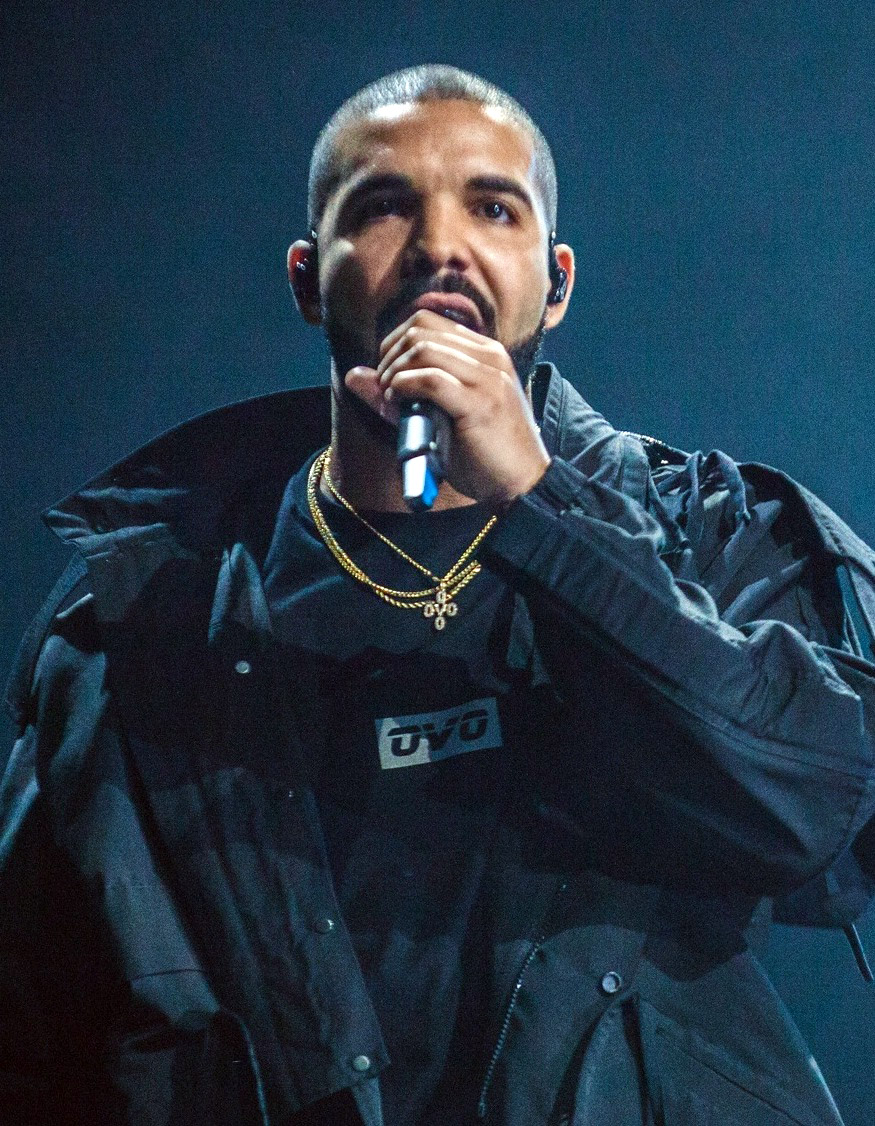
Drake

- D Double E
- D The Business
- D'banj
- D-Flame
- D-Loc
- D-Nice
- D-Shot
- D-Sisive
- D.C. Scorpio
- D.C. Young Fly
- D.King
- D Mob
- D. Savage
- D Smoke
- D4vd
- Da Brakes
- Da Brat
- Da Emperor
- Da Grin
- Da L.E.S
- Da Uzi
- DaBaby
- Daboyway
- Daddy G
- Daddy Mac
- Daddy-O
- Daddy Yankee
- Daddy X
- Dadju
- Dadoo
- Dae Dae
- Daedelus
- DaHeala
- Daehyeon
- Dai Burger
- Daisha McBride
- Dajim
- Dallas Woods
- Damani Nkosi
- Dame Grease
- Damian Lillard
- Damu the Fudgemunk
- Damso
- Dan Bull
- Dan the Automator
- Dana Dane
- Dana Dentata
- Dandrell Scott
- Danger Mouse
- Dani M
- Dani Mocanu
- Daniel Kelly
- DaniLeigh
- DanimaL
- Danny!
- Danny Boy
- Danny Brown
- Danny Diablo
- Danny Rodriguez
- Danya Milokhin
- Daoko
- Dappy
- Dapwell
- Dardan
- Darell
- Dareysteel
- Dargen D'Amico
- Darkoo
- Darnell Roy
- Dash
- Dave
- Dave Blunts
- Dave East
- Daveed Diggs
- David Banner
- David Dallas
- David Jude Jolicoeur
- David Rush
- David Stones
- Davido
- Datin
- Dawin
- Dawn
- Dax
- Daye Jack
- Daz Dillinger
- Dazzie Dee
- DC The Don
- DD Osama
- DDG
- De La Ghetto
- De Leve
- Deacon the Villain
- Dead Hendrix
- Dean
- Dean Blunt
- Deante' Hitchcock
- DeathbyRomy
- Dedekind Cut
- Dee Barnes
- Dee Dee King
- Dee Nasty
- Dee-1
- Deeder Zaman
- Deezer D
- Deezle
- Deepflow
- Dej Loaf
- Del the Funky Homosapien
- Delilah Bon
- Dem Atlas
- Demon One
- Demrick
- Denaun Porter
- Dendemann
- Deniro Farrar
- Denis Stoff
- Denise Barbacena
- Denise Chaila
- Denmark Vessey
- Deno
- Denyo
- Denzel Curry
- Depzman
- Deraj
- Derek B
- Derek Minor
- Derrick Milano
- DeScribe
- Desiigner
- Desingerica
- Despo Rutti
- Despot
- Dessa
- DeStorm Power
- Destroy Lonely
- Detail
- Detsl
- Deuce
- Dev
- Devang Patel
- Devin the Dude
- Devito
- Devlin
- Devolo
- Dewey Saunders
- Dexter
- Dez Nado
- Diabolic
- Diam's
- Diamond
- Diamond D
- Diamond Platnumz
- Diamondog
- Dice Ailes
- Dice Raw
- Diego Tryno
- Didier Awadi
- Didine Canon 16
- DigDat
- Digga D
- Diggy Simmons
- Digital Nas
- DijahSB
- DillanPonders
- Dillaz
- Dillom
- Dimal
- Dimples D.
- DinDin
- Dionne Bromfield
- Dinos
- Dionté Boom
- Disco D
- Disco King Mario
- Disiz
- Divine
- Divine Styler
- Dizzee Rascal
- Dizzy Wright
- DJ AB
- DJ Abdel
- DJ Abilities
- DJ Arafat
- DJ Babu
- DJ Besho
- DJ Caise
- DJ Cam
- DJ Cash Money
- DJ Casper
- DJ Charlie B
- DJ Charlie Chase
- DJ Chuck Chillout
- DJ Clay
- DJ Clue?
- DJ Cocoa Chanelle
- DJ Crazy Toones
- DJ Cuppy
- DJ Dahi
- DJ Disciple
- DJ Disco Wiz
- DJ Drama
- DJ Envy
- DJ Esco
- DJ Fakts One
- DJ Feel-X
- DJ Felli Fel
- DJ Fresh
- DJ Funk
- DJ Fuze
- DJ Green Lantern
- DJ Harrison
- DJ Head
- DJ Hoppa
- DJ Hurricane
- DJ Jazzy Jeff
- DJ Jazzy Joyce
- DJ Kay Slay
- DJ Khaled
- DJ Khalil
- DJ Kool
- DJ Kool Herc
- DJ Krush
- DJ Lambo
- DJ Lethal
- DJ Maj
- DJ Maphorisa
- DJ Marlboro
- DJ Mehdi
- DJ Muggs
- DJ Mustard
- DJ Neptune
- DJ Official
- DJ Paul
- DJ Pooh
- DJ Premier
- DJ Qbert
- DJ Quik
- DJ Rhettmatic
- DJ Richie Rich
- DJ Run
- DJ Scratch
- DJ Screw
- DJ Shadow
- DJ Skitz
- DJ Skribble
- DJ Snake
- DJ Spinderella
- DJ Spinna
- DJ Spinz
- DJ Spooky
- DJ Stretch Armstrong
- DJ Subroc
- DJ Suede the Remix God
- DJ Tiiiiiiiiiip
- DJ Tomekk
- DJ Toomp
- DJ U-Neek
- DJ Uncle Al
- DJ Vyrusky
- DJ Webstar
- DJ Whoo Kid
- DJ Xclusive
- DJ Yella
- DJ Yung Vamp
- Djérabé Ndigngar
- Djonga
- DMC
- DLOW
- DMX
- Doah
- Doap Nixon
- Dobby
- Doc Gynéco
- Doc Shaw
- Doctor Dré
- Doe B
- Doe Boy
- Doechii
- Doja Cat
- Dogge Doggelito
- Dogo Janja
- Dok2
- Dolla
- Dolphin
- Dom Kennedy
- Dominic Fike
- Dominique Young Unique
- Domino
- Domo D
- Domo Genesis
- Donald Glover
- Don Cannon
- Don Malik
- Don Q
- Don Toliver
- Don Trip
- Don Xhoni
- Donae'o
- Donnalyn Bartolome
- Donnie
- Donnis
- DoNormaal
- Dope Knife
- Dope Saint Jude
- Dopebwoy
- Dorrough
- Doseone
- Dosseh
- Dot da Genius
- Dot Rotten
- Double K
- Double Lz
- Doudou Masta
- Doug E. Fresh
- Doughbeezy
- Down AKA Kilo
- Doyoung
- DPR Ian
- DPR Live
- Dr SID
- Dr. Alban
- Dr. Dre
- Drag-On
- Drake
- Drakeo the Ruler
- Drama
- Drapht
- DreamDoll
- Dred Scott
- Dree Low
- DrefGold
- Dremo
- Dres
- Dresta
- Drew Deezy
- Drew Parks
- Dreezy
- Drezus
- Driicky Graham
- Drik Barbosa
- Dro Kenji
- Droop-E
- Drmngnow
- Duckwrth
- Dru Down
- Drumma Boy
- Druski
- Dry
- DTTX
- Dua Saleh
- Dub-L
- Dubbledge
- Dubzy
- Ducko McFli
- Dudley Perkins
- Dudu Faruk
- Duke Deuce
- Duki
- Dum-Dum
- Dumbfoundead
- Dun Deal
- Duncan Mighty
- Durella
- Dusty Locane
- Dutch ReBelle
- Dutchavelli
- Dutty Dior
- Duwap Kaine
- DVLP
- Dwele
- Dylan Brady
- Dylan Cartlidge
- Dylan Ross
- Dyme-A-Duzin
- DyspOra
- Dystinct
- Dziarma

== E ==
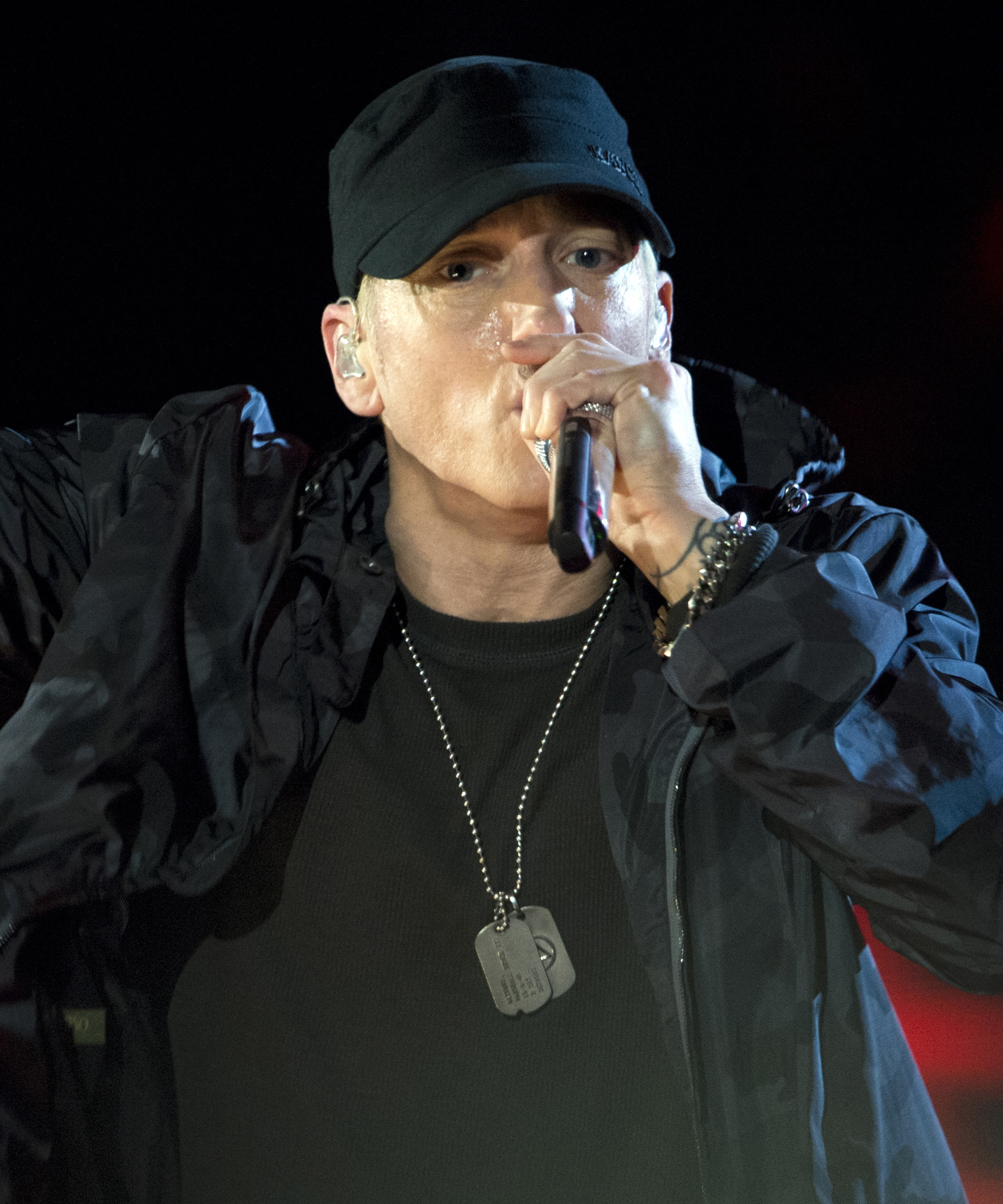
Eminem

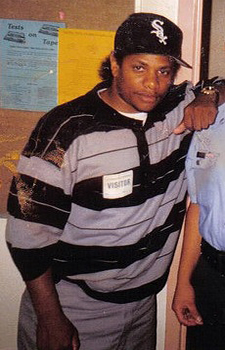
Eazy-E

- E-40
- E-A-Ski
- E-Dubble
- E.D.I. Mean
- E-Sens
- E-Sir
- E.S.G.
- Earl Sweatshirt
- Earlly Mac
- Early B
- East Flatbush Project
- Easy Mo Bee
- Eazy-E
- EBK Jaaybo
- Ecca Vandal
- Ecco2k
- Enchanting
- Eedris Abdulkareem
- Eekwol
- Efe
- Ed Lover
- Ed O.G.
- Edan
- Eddie Dee
- Eddie F
- Eddie Kadi
- Eddie Wizzy
- Eddy Baker
- Eddy de Pretto
- Edo Maajka
- Edgar Allen Floe
- Edgar Wasser
- Eduardo
- Eem Triplin
- Egor Kreed
- Egoraptor
- Egyptian Lover
- Ehis D’Greatest
- Ekkstacy
- Eko Fresh
- EL
- El Alfa
- El Da Sensei
- El DeBarge
- El Presidente
- El-P
- Eladio Carrión
- Élan of The D.E.Y.
- eLDee
- Eldzhey
- Ele A el Dominio
- Elena Kitić
- Elephant Man
- ElGrandeToto
- Elh Kmer
- ELHAE
- Eli Njuchi
- Elif Demirezer
- Elijah Connor
- Elijah Daniel
- Eligh
- Einár
- Elle Royal
- Elliott Power
- ELS
- Ella Mai
- Elmer
- Elucid
- Elzhi
- Emay
- Emcee N.I.C.E.
- Emicida
- Emile Haynie
- Eminem
- Emis Killa
- Emtee
- Emmy Gee
- Enigma
- Enny
- Eno
- Eno Barony
- Ensi
- Enzo Amore
- EO
- Epic Mazur
- Eprhyme
- Erfan
- Eric B.
- Eric Bellinger
- Eric Biddines
- Eric July
- Eric Reprid
- Eric Stanley
- Erica Banks
- Ericdoa
- Erick Arc Elliott
- Erick Sermon
- Erigga
- Erika Dos Santos
- Ernia
- EsDeeKid
- Esham
- Eshon Burgundy
- Eskeerdo
- Esoteric
- EST Gee
- Estelle
- Ethereal
- Ethel Cain
- Eugy
- Euna Kim
- Eunice Olumide
- Euro
- Eva Alordiah
- Eve
- Everlast
- Evidence
- Evil Pimp
- EXP
- Exile
- Extince
- Exy
- Eyedea
- Eyedress
- Eyenine
- Eypio
- Ez Mil
- Ezhel

== F ==
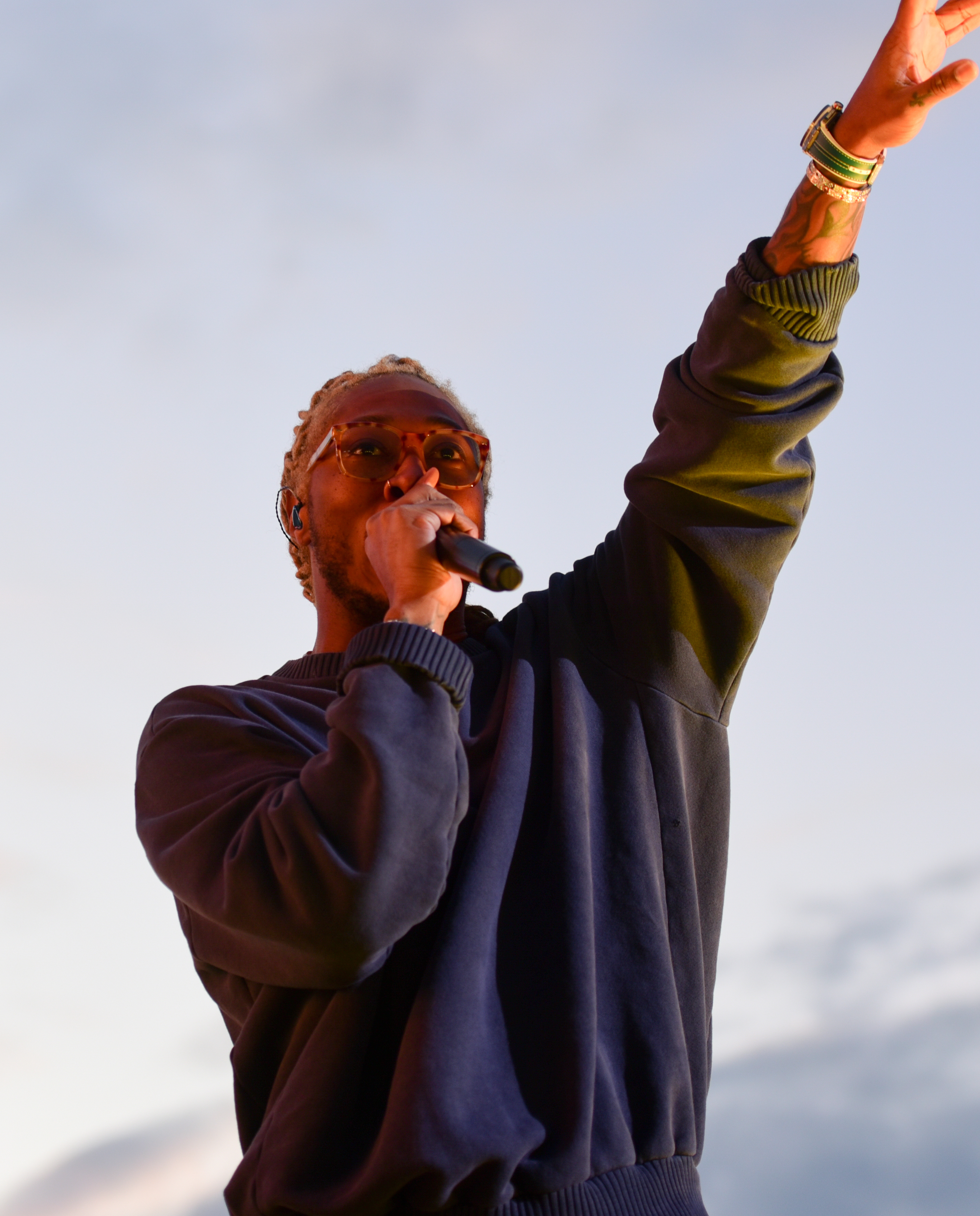
Future

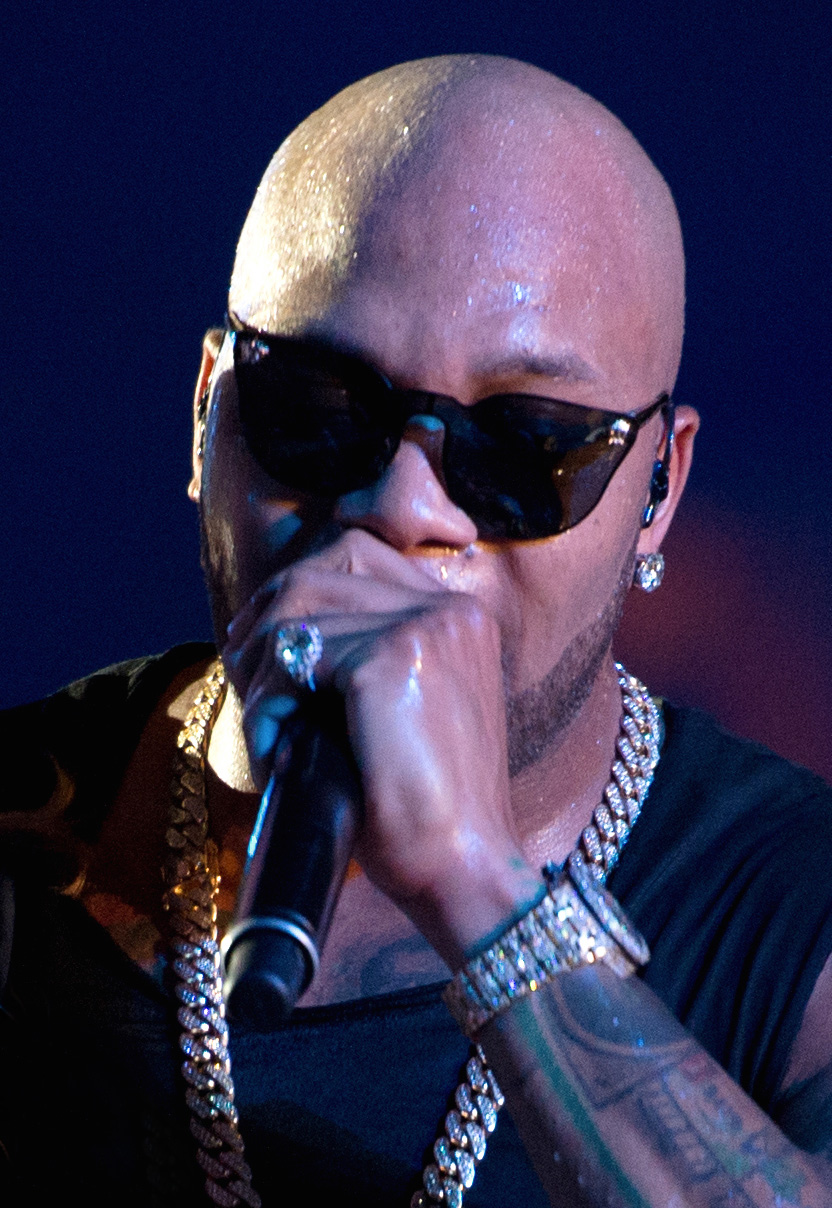
Flo Rida

- F1lthy
- Fababy
- Fabe
- Fabio Rovazzi
- Fabolous
- Fabri Fibra
- Face
- Factor Chandelier
- Fadaei
- Faf Larage
- Fahda Romie
- fakemink
- Fakhar-e-Alam
- Falco
- Falz
- Fam-Lay
- Fameye
- Famous Dex
- Fan_3
- Fan Chengcheng
- Fantasia
- Fantasy A
- Faraón Love Shady
- Farid Bang
- Faris Shafi
- Farma G
- Farruko
- Farshad
- Fashawn
- Fasma
- Fat Joe
- Fat Nick
- Fat Pat
- Fat Tony
- Fat Trel
- Fateh
- Father
- Father MC
- Fatlip
- Fatman Scoop
- Fatt Father
- Fausto Fawcett
- Faydee
- Fazer
- Fecko
- Fedez
- Feduk
- Féfé
- Feis
- Fejo
- Felicia Pearson
- Felix
- Feloni
- Felly
- Fenix Flexin
- Ferg
- Fergie
- Fern
- Fero
- Fero47
- Ferréz
- Ferris MC
- Fetty Wap
- Fieldy
- Fiend
- Fifi Cooper
- Fik Fameica
- Finesse2tymes
- Finch
- Finn Askew
- Fireboy DML
- Fivio Foreign
- FKA Twigs
- FKi 1st
- Flabba
- Flame
- Flau'jae Johnson
- Flav
- Flavor Flav
- Flavour N'abania
- Fler
- Flesh-n-Bone
- Fleur East
- Flex D'Paper
- Flip Kowlier
- Flipp Dinero
- Flo Rida
- Flo Milli
- Flohio
- Florat
- Flosstradamus
- Flowdan
- Flow G
- Flowsik
- Flow Jackson
- Fly Anakin
- Fly Young Red
- Flying Lotus
- Flynn Adam
- Focalistic
- Focus...
- Foesum
- Fonzworth Bentley
- Foogiano
- Foreknown
- Forgiato Blow
- Forrest Frank
- Fort Minor
- FouKi
- Fousey
- Foxx
- Foxy Brown
- Francis M
- Franco126
- Franglish
- Frank Casino
- Frank Dorrey
- Frank Ocean
- Frankie Bash
- Frankie J
- Frauenarzt
- Frayser Boy
- Freak Nasty
- Freaky Tah
- Fred Again
- Fred De Palma
- Fred Durst
- Fred the Godson
- Freddie Bruno
- Freddie Dredd
- Freddie Foxxx
- Freddie Gibbs
- Freda Rhymz
- Fredo
- Fredo Bang
- Fredo Santana
- Fredro Starr
- Fredwreck
- Free
- Freek
- Freekey Zekey
- Freeman
- Freeway
- Freeze Corleone
- French Montana
- French the Kid
- Frenchie
- Frenkie
- Fresh Kid Ice
- Fresh Kid UG
- Fricky
- Frida Amani
- Fridayy
- Frisco
- Friyie
- Froid
- Fronda
- Froggy Fresh
- Fronz
- Frost
- Frvrfriday
- Fuat Ergin
- Fugative
- Full Blooded
- Full Tac
- Fumez the Engineer
- Funkmaster Flex
- Fura
- Fuse ODG
- Future
- Futuristic
- Fuzati
- Fuzz Scoota

== G ==
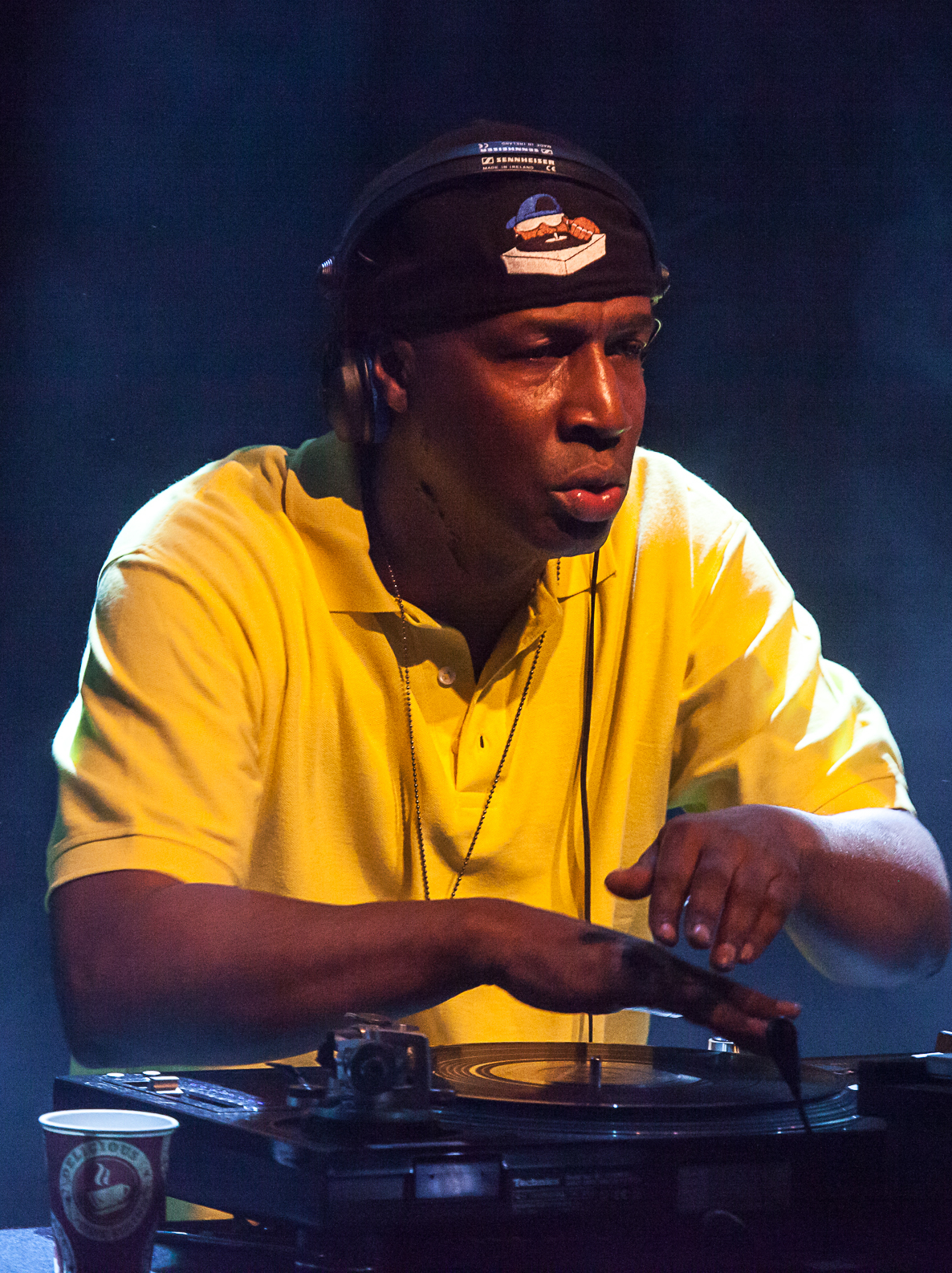
Grandmaster Flash

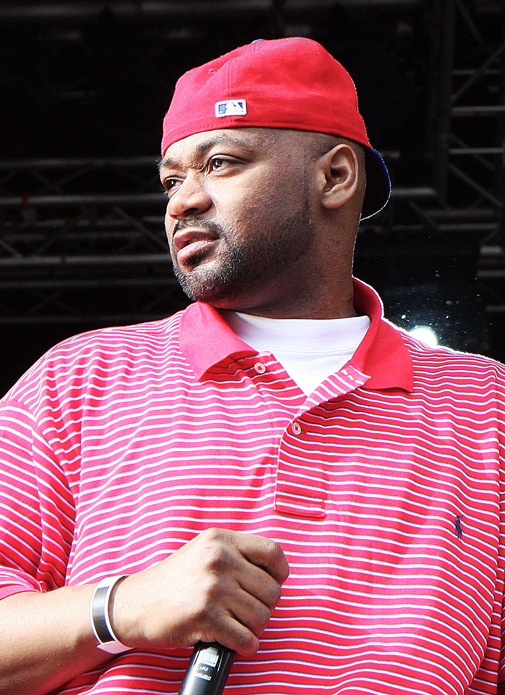
Ghostface Killah

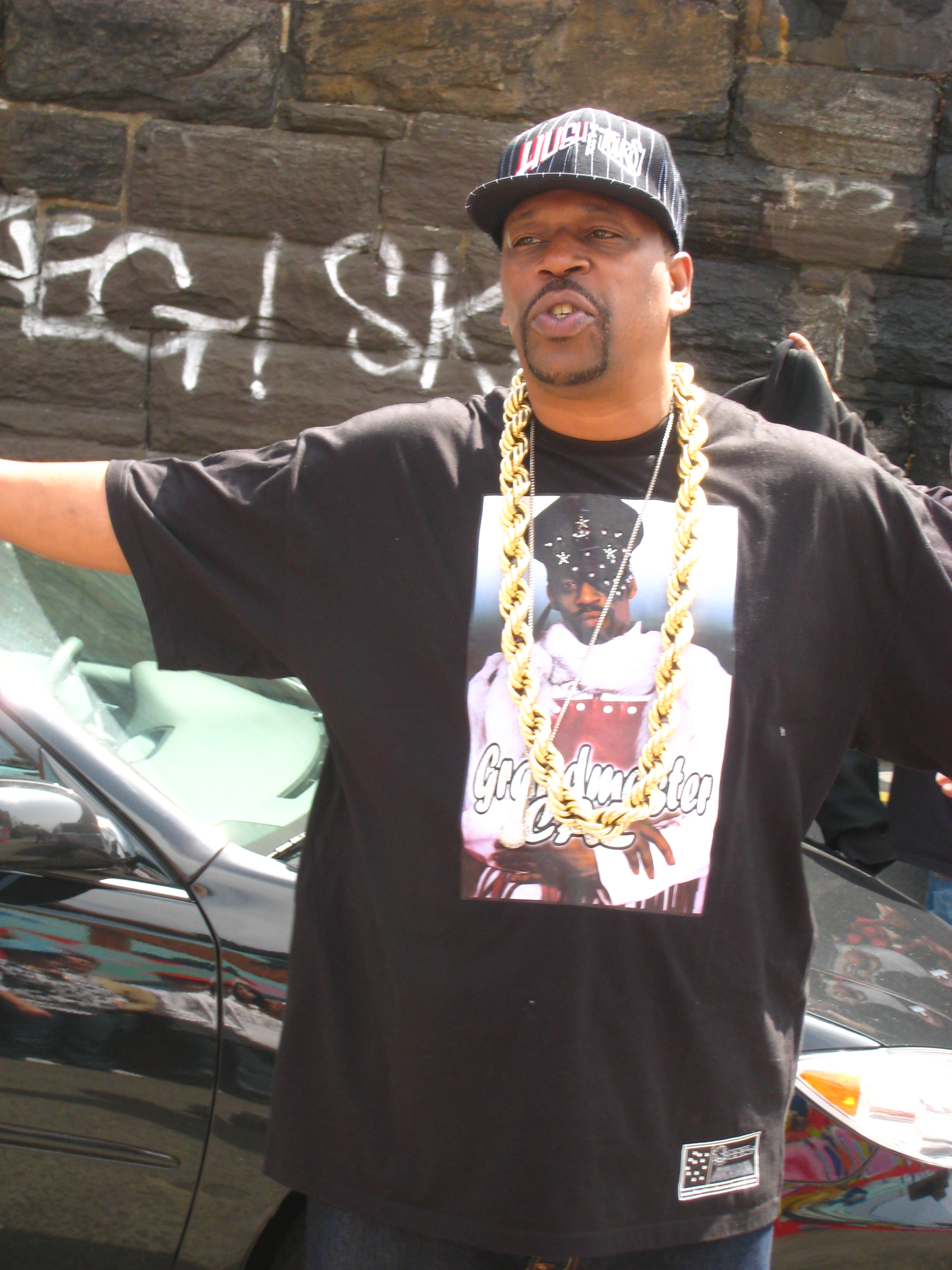
Grandmaster Caz

- G-Dragon
- G-Eazy
- G. Dep
- G Herbo
- G Koop
- G2
- Gaboro
- Gabriel o Pensador
- Gabriel Teodros
- Gaeko
- Gaika
- Gambi
- GAMBO
- The Game
- Gangsta Boo
- Gangsta Pat
- Ganksta N-I-P
- Gary
- Gary G-Wiz
- Gashi
- GaTa
- Gata Cattana
- Gavin Cracck
- Gawne
- GAWVI
- Gazo
- Gee Money
- GeeGun
- Geko
- Gelo
- Gemini Major
- Gemitaiz
- General Levy
- General Woo
- Genesis Owusu
- Genesis the Greykid
- Genius Nochang
- Geolier
- George the Poet
- Georgia
- Georgia Anne Muldrow
- Georgio
- Gerald Walker
- Gerardo
- Germ
- Getter
- Ghais Guevara
- Ghali
- Ghemon
- Ghettosocks
- Ghetts
- Ghostemane
- Ghostface Killah
- Ghostly
- Ghosty
- Gianmaria
- Gianni Bismark
- Giant Pink
- Gift of Gab
- Giggs
- Gigi Lamayne
- Gilli
- Gims
- Ginni Mahi
- Ginuwine
- Giriboy
- Girli
- Glaive
- Glasses Malone
- GLC
- Glints
- Gloc-9
- Gloria Groove
- GloRilla
- Gloss Up
- Gmac Cash
- Gnash
- GNL Zamba
- Godfather Don
- Goldie Loc
- Gold Fang
- GoldLink
- Goldy
- Goody Grace
- Goonew
- Gorilla Nems
- Gorilla Zoe
- Goya Menor
- Gradur
- Grafh
- Graft
- Grand Daddy I.U.
- Grand Puba
- Grandmaster Caz
- Grandmaster Flash
- Grandson
- Gran Omar
- Gray
- Greatman Takit
- Greatness Jones
- Gree
- Greekazo
- Green Montana
- Grems
- Greydon Square
- Grieves
- Grimes
- Gringe
- Grip
- The Grouch
- Gru
- Grše
- Guapdad 4000
- Guante
- Guaynaa
- Gucci Mane
- Gud
- Gudda Gudda
- Gué Pequeno
- Guelo Star
- Guerilla Black
- Guess Who
- Guilty Simpson
- Gulddreng
- Gunna
- Gunplay
- Gurinder Gill
- Guru
- Guvna B
- Guy2Bezbar
- Gwamba
- Gwen Stefani
- GZA
- Gzuz

== H ==
- H Magnum
- Haas G
- Hades
- Haftbefehl
- Haha
- Haifa Beseisso
- Haitian Jack
- Hak
- Hak Baker
- Haleek Maul
- Half a Mill
- Hamé
- Hamza
- Han Yo-han
- Hangzoo
- Hanhae
- Hanumankind
- Hanz On
- Haon
- Hard Kaur
- Hardstone
- Hardy Caprio
- Harmonize
- Harris
- Harry Fraud
- Harry Mack
- Haru Nemuri
- Harvey
- Hasan Salaam
- Hash Swan
- Hatik
- Hau Latukefu
- Hava
- Haval
- Haviah Mighty
- Havoc
- Hayce Lemsi
- Hayki
- Haystak
- Headie One
- Heather B
- Heather Hunter
- Heavy D
- Héctor el Father
- Heems
- HeeSun Lee
- Hef
- Hefe Heetroc
- Height
- Heize
- Hell Raton
- Hell Razah
- Hell Rell
- Helluva
- Hemlock Ernst
- Herobust
- Hesta Prynn
- Heuss l'Enfoiré
- Hev Abi
- Hi-C
- Hi-Tek
- Hichkas
- Hiljson Mandela
- HillaryJane
- Hip Hop Pantsula
- Hit-Boy
- Hobo Johnson
- Hodgy
- Hollow da Don
- Holy Ten
- Homeboy Sandman
- Honcho
- Honey Cocaine
- Hongjoong
- Hook
- Hoodie Allen
- Hoodrich Pablo Juan
- Hooligan Hefs
- Hoony
- Hopsin
- Hornet La Frappe
- Hot Dollar
- Hot Rod
- Hot Sugar
- Hotboii
- Hotboy Wes
- Houda Abouz
- Houdini
- Hoya
- Htiekal
- Huang Zitao
- Hulvey
- Hunxho
- Hurricane Chris
- Hurricane G
- Hurricane Wisdom
- Husalah
- Hush
- Huskii
- Husky
- Hussein Fatal
- Hwasa
- Hyper-T
- Hypno Carlito
- Hyuna

== I ==
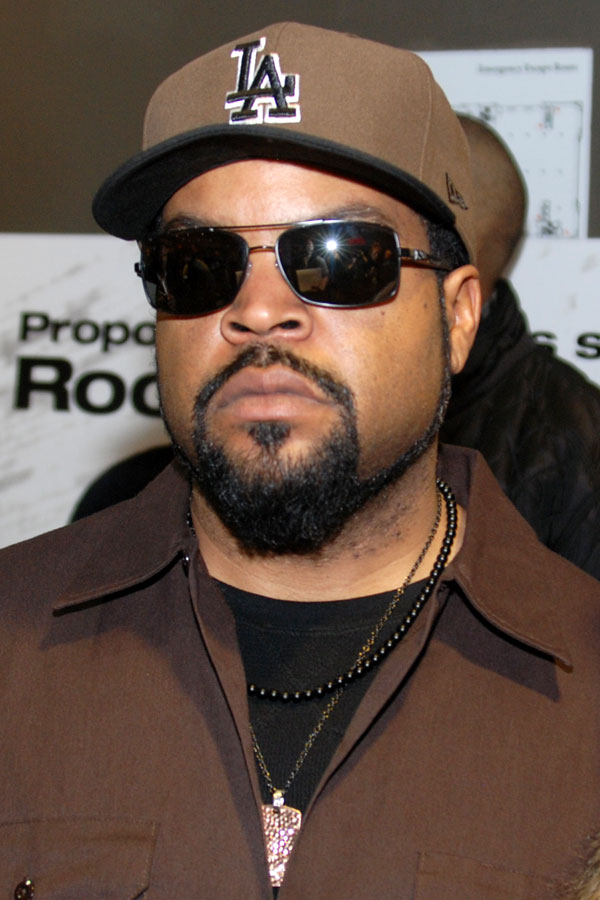
Ice Cube

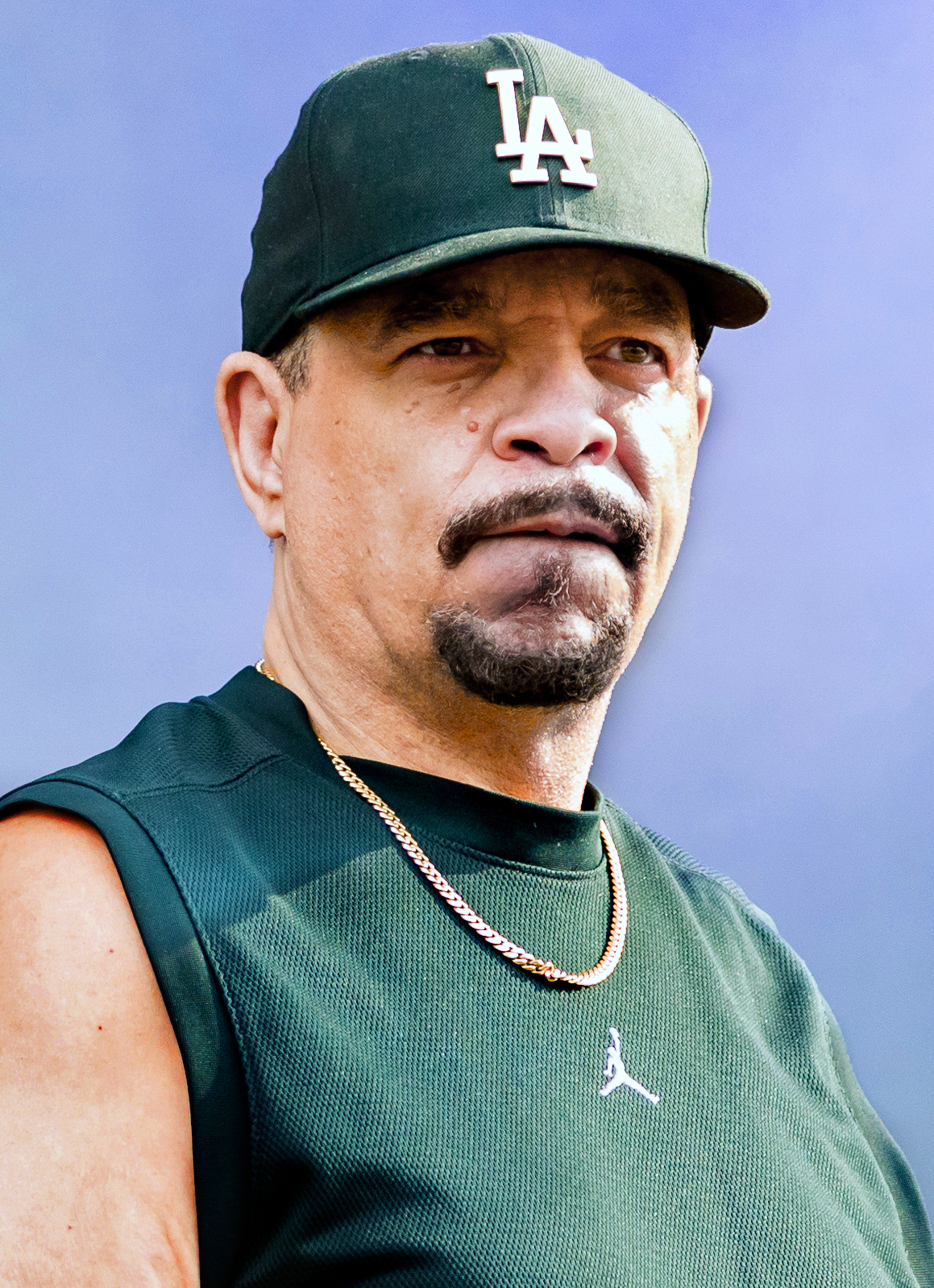
Ice-T

- I Self Devine
- I-20
- I.K
- I.M
- IAMDDB
- Iamsu!
- Ian
- Ian Jazzi
- Iann Dior
- iayze
- Ice Cube
- Ice MC
- Ice Prince
- Ice Spice
- Ice-T
- IceJJFish
- Icewear Vezzo
- IDK
- Idris Elba
- Iggy Azalea
- Iglooghost
- IHeartMemphis
- Ikechukwu
- Ikka Singh
- Iko The Rainman
- Il Tre
- Ilacoin
- Ilhoon
- Illslick
- Ill Bill
- Illa J
- Illbliss
- Illenium
- Illmaculate
- Illmind
- Illogic
- IllRymz
- Illson
- Ilmari
- ILoveMakonnen
- Iman Shumpert
- Imen Es
- Imhotep
- Immortal Technique
- Imposs
- Imran Khan
- Inez Jasper
- Indila
- Indo G
- Indulekha Warrier
- Infinity Knives
- Innanet James
- Innovator
- Inoki
- Inspectah Deck
- Instasamka
- Invincible
- IQ
- Irama
- IRAWniQ
- Irina Smelaya
- Irv Gotti
- Iron
- Isabella Rositano
- Isaiah Rashad
- IshDARR
- Ishmael Butler
- IShowSpeed
- Isleña Antumalen
- Islord
- Issa Gold
- Issa Twaimz
- Issam
- Ivorian Doll
- Ivy Queen
- Ivy Sole
- Iwa K
- Iyanya
- Izi

== J ==
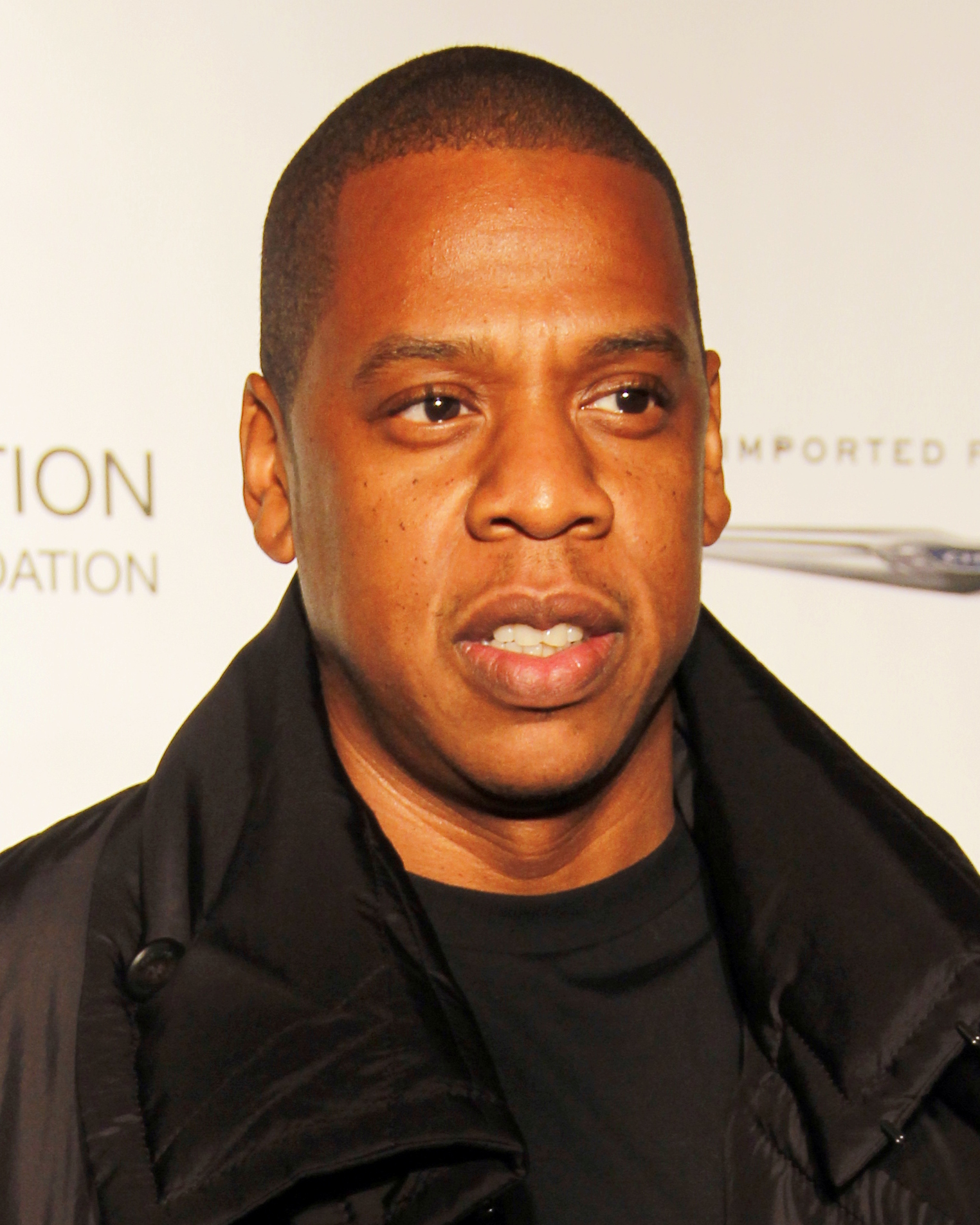
Jay-Z

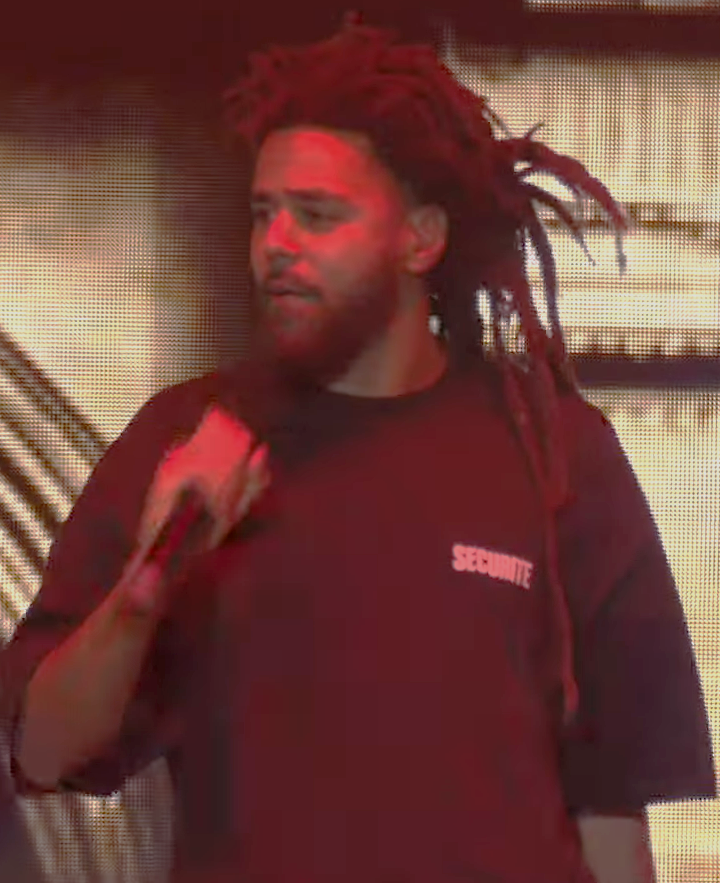
J. Cole

- J Álvarez
- J Balvin
- J Dilla
- J Hus
- J Smooth
- J-Ax
- J-Diggs
- J-Flexx
- J-Hope
- J-Kwon
- J-Me
- J-Milla
- J-Live
- J-Ro
- J-Roc
- J-Son
- J. Cardim
- J. Cole
- J. Dash
- J.Don
- J. Holiday
- J. Martins
- J.Oliver
- J.P.
- J. Rawls
- J. Stalin
- J. Valentine
- J. Wells
- J.I the Prince of N.Y
- J.Lately
- J.R. Rotem
- J.R. Writer
- J57
- Ja Mezz
- Ja Rule
- Jabee
- Jack Harlow
- Jack Parow
- Jack the Smoker
- The Jacka
- Jacki-O
- Jackie Hill Perry
- Jacob Banks
- Jacoby Shaddix
- Jacquees
- Jacques Anthony
- Jackson Wang
- Jacky Brown
- Jadakiss
- Jaden Smith
- Jae Millz
- Jaehyun
- Jafaris
- Jaffar Byn
- Jala Brat
- Jamie Grace
- Jamie Madrox
- Jamie T
- Jammer
- Jan Delay
- Jah Jah
- Jah Khalib
- Jaheim
- Jahkoy Palmer
- Jahlil Beats
- Jahred
- Jake La Furia
- Jake Hill
- Jake Miller
- Jake One
- Jake Paul
- Jakki tha Motamouth
- Jallal
- Jam Master Jay
- Jamal
- Jamal Woolard
- Jamie Foxx
- James Brown
- Jammz
- Jamule
- Janelle Monáe
- Jared Gomes
- Jarobi White
- Jarren Benton
- Jasiah
- Jasiri X
- Jasmin Moallem
- Jason "J" Brown
- Jason Derulo
- Jason Ivy
- Jason Nevins
- Jasper Dolphin
- Jay1
- Jay Bezel
- Jay Burna
- Jay Critch
- Jay Electronica
- Jay Park
- Jay Pharoah
- Jay Rock
- Jay Sean
- Jay Tee
- Jay Whiss
- Jay-Z
- JayDaYoungan
- Jaydes
- JayFrance
- Jaykae
- Jayo Felony
- Jayso
- Jaz-O
- Jaz Dhami
- Jazz Cartier
- Jazze Pha
- Jazzy
- JB the First Lady
- Jean Dawson
- Jean Grae
- Jeeep
- Jeezy
- Jeff Bass
- Jefferson Qian
- Jeffree Star
- Jehst
- Jel
- Jeleel
- Jelly Roll
- Jellybean
- Jennie
- Jennifer Lopez
- Jentina
- Jeon Ji-yoon
- Jeremiah Jae
- Jeremih
- Jermaine Dupri
- Jerome Jones
- Jeru the Damaja
- Jeshi
- JessB
- Jesse Boykins III
- Jesse Dangerously
- Jesse Jagz
- Jesse Jaymes
- Jessie Reyez
- Jesse Suntele
- Jessi
- Jesto
- Jesús Pat Chablé
- JetsonMade
- Jewell
- JGivens
- Jharrel Jerome
- Jhayco
- Jhené Aiko
- Jibbs
- JID
- Jidenna
- Jim Jones
- Jim Jonsin
- Jimblah
- Jimmy Prime
- Jimmy Spicer
- Jimmy Wopo
- Jimothy
- Jinu
- Jipsta
- Jireel
- Jisoo
- JJ Esko
- JK-47
- Jme
- Jneiro Jarel
- Jnr Choi
- Jo Gwang-il
- Jo Woo-chan
- Joe Budden
- Joe C.
- Joeboy
- Joelistics
- Joell Ortiz
- Joey Badass
- Joey Boy
- Joey Fatts
- Joey the Jerk
- Joey Purp
- Joey Stylez
- JoeyStarr
- Johan Lenox
- John Cena
- John Forté
- John Givez
- John Legend
- Johniepee
- Johnny "J"
- Johnny Richter
- Johnson
- Johntá Austin
- Joji
- Jok'Air
- Joker (British)
- Joker (Turkish)
- Jokeren
- Jon Bellion
- Jon Connor
- Jon Z
- Jonezen
- JonFX
- Jonny "Itch" Fox
- Jonny Z
- Jonwayne
- JooE
- Joohoney
- Joost Klein
- Jordan Adetunji
- Jords
- Jorma Taccone
- Jose Chameleone
- Joseline Hernandez
- Josh Dun
- Josylvio
- Journalist
- Joyner Lucas
- Joyo Velarde
- JPEGMafia
- JR
- Jr. Gong
- Json
- JSX
- JT
- JT Money
- JT the Bigga Figga
- Jua Cali
- Jub Jub
- Jucee Froot
- Judge Da Boss
- Juelz Santana
- Juggy D
- Juice (American)
- Juice (Serbian)
- Juice Aleem
- Juice WRLD
- Juicy J
- Juju
- Jul
- Julian Marley
- Julio Foolio
- Juls
- Jumpsteady
- Juma Nature
- Jumz
- Junglepussy
- Junhyung
- Junia-T
- Junior Cally
- Junoflo
- Jus Allah
- Just Blaze
- Just Brittany
- Just-Ice
- Just Slim
- Justhis
- Justina Valentine
- Juvenile
- JV Kapunan
- Jvcki Wai
- Jxdn
- JyellowL

== K ==
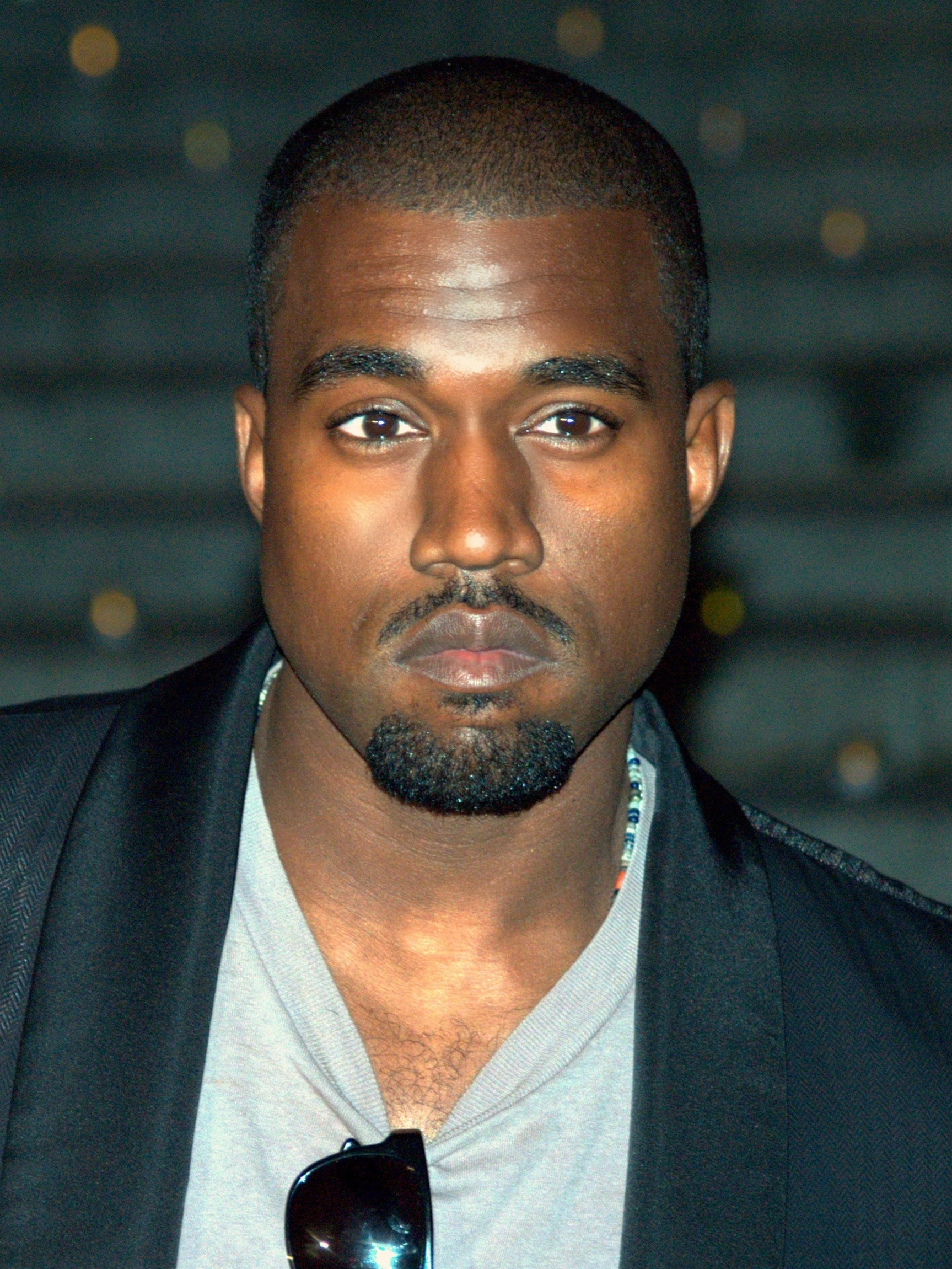
Kanye West

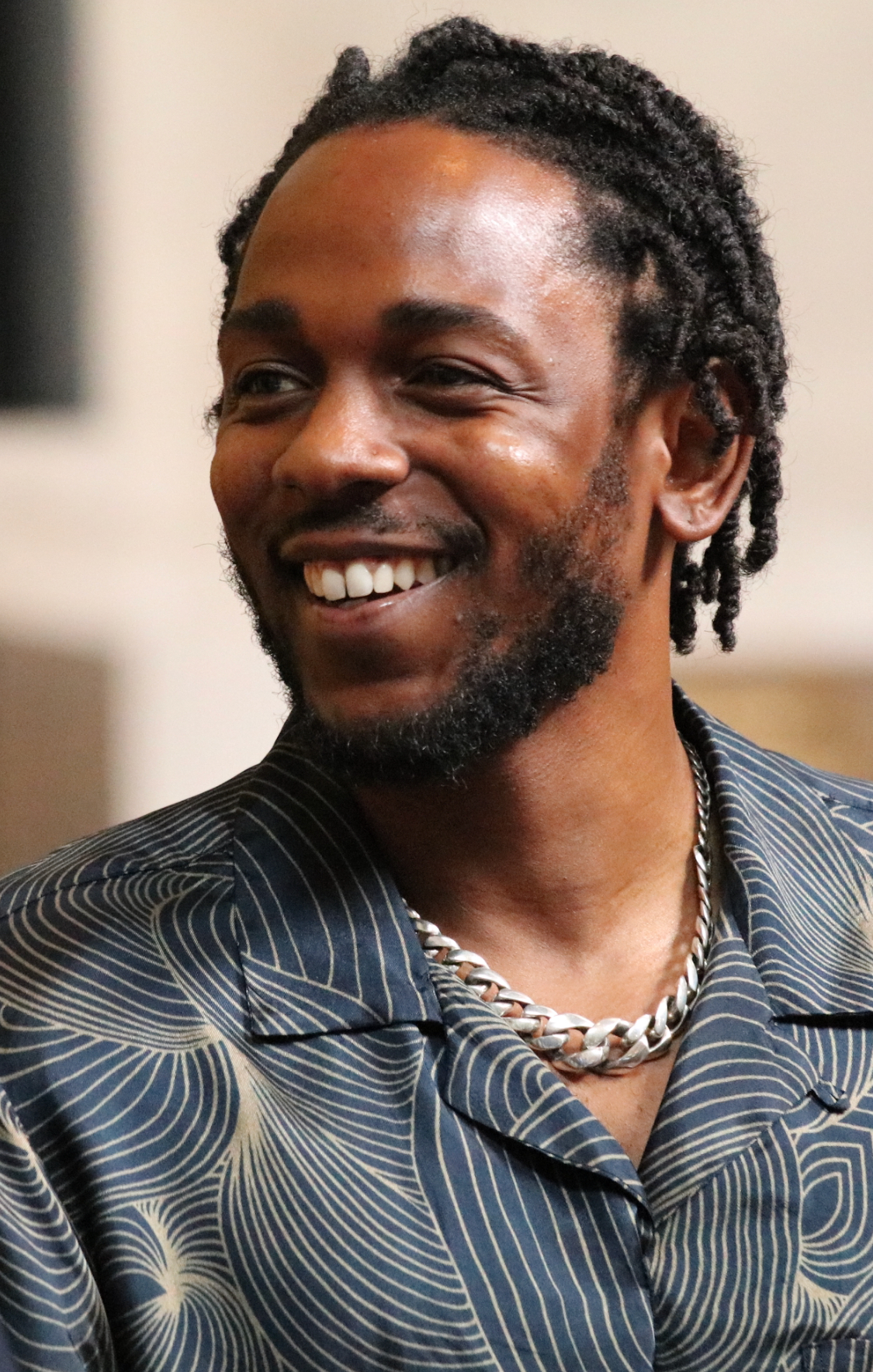
Kendrick Lamar

- K Camp
- K Koke
- K Suave
- K'naan
- K-Cut
- K-Dee
- K-OS
- K-Solo
- K-Trap
- K7
- K.A.A.N.
- K.E. on the Track
- K.Flay
- K.O
- K.One
- Ka
- Käärijä
- Kaaris
- Kaash Paige
- Kafani
- Kahukx
- Kai Cenat
- Kaila Mullady
- Kalan.FrFr
- Kalash
- Kalash Criminel
- Kalash l'Afro
- Kaliii
- Kali Uchis
- Kalyn Heffernan
- Kam
- Kamaiyah
- KAMAUU
- Kamelancien
- Kamelen
- Kami
- KaMillion
- Kamini
- Kamufle
- Kanary Diamonds
- Kang Daniel
- Kangol Kid
- Kanii
- Kankan
- Kano
- Kanto
- Kantu
- Kanye West
- Kap G
- Karan Aujla
- Kardinal Offishall
- Kari Faux
- Karlous Miller
- Karol Conká
- Karrahbooo
- Karri Koira
- Karriem Riggins
- Kash Doll
- Ka$hdami
- Kastro
- Kat Dahlia
- Kat DeLuna
- Katey Red
- Katie Got Bandz
- Katja Krasavice
- Katt Williams
- Kaves
- Kawan Prather
- Kay Flock
- Kay One
- KayCyy
- Kaydy Cain
- Kayna Samet
- Kaytranada
- Kaza
- KB
- KB Killa Beats
- KC Rebell
- Keak da Sneak
- KeBlack
- Keef Cowboy
- Kehlani
- Keişan
- Keith Ape
- Keith Murray
- Keith Shocklee
- Kel Spencer
- Kelechi
- Kelis
- Kell Kay
- Kellee Maize
- Kelvin Krash
- Kelvyn Colt
- Kemba
- Kemet the Phantom
- Kemmler
- Ken Carson
- Kendo Kaponi
- Kendrick Lamar
- Kenn Starr
- Kenny Allstar
- Kenny Beats
- Kenny Mason
- Kenny Segal
- KenTheMan
- Kent Jones
- Keny Arkana
- Kenzo B
- Kero One
- Kerser
- Kery James
- Kesha
- Kesi
- Kev Brown
- Kevin Abstract
- Kevin Federline
- Kevin Gates
- Kevin McCall
- Kevin Rudolf
- Kevvo
- Key
- Key Glock
- Kevin Fret
- Keysha Freshh
- Keyshia Cole
- Khaid
- Khalid
- Khaligraph Jones
- Khalil Madovi
- Khantrast
- Khea
- Kheengz
- Khia
- Khleo
- Khontkar
- Khrysis
- Khujo
- Khuli Chana
- Kia Shine
- Kid Bookie
- Kid Buu
- Kid Capri
- Kid Cudi
- Kid Frost
- Kid Ink
- Kid Koala
- Kid Milli
- Kid Quill
- Kid Rad
- Kid Rock
- Kid Sensation
- Kid Sister
- Kid Yugi
- Kidd Kenn
- Kidd Kidd
- Kidda
- KiDi
- Kiing Shooter
- Kikky Badass
- Killa Hakan
- Killa Kela
- Killa Sin
- Killagramz
- Killah Priest
- Killer Kau
- Killer Mike
- KILLY
- Kilo Ali
- Kilo Kish
- Kim Dracula
- Kim Jin-pyo
- Kim Se-yong
- Kim Yu-bin
- Kinetic 9
- King
- King Badger
- King Chip
- King Combs
- King Gordy
- King Iso
- King Kaka
- King Krule
- King L
- King Paluta
- King T
- King Tech
- King Von
- Kings
- Kinnie Starr
- Kinny Zimmer
- Kino
- Kirani Ayat
- Kirk Knight
- Kirko Bangz
- Kisum
- KittiB
- Kitty
- Kitty Kat
- Kizaru
- Kizo
- KJ-52
- Klay BBJ
- Knero Lapaé
- Knightowl
- Kno
- Knoc-turn'al
- Knucks
- Knxwledge
- KO
- Ko-c
- Koba LaD
- Kobie Dee
- Kodak Black
- Kodie Shane
- Koffee
- Kofi Byble
- Kofi Jamar
- Kofi Kinaata
- Kofi Mole
- KOHH
- Kohndo
- Kojaque
- Kojey Radical
- Kojo Funds
- Kokane
- Kollegah
- Koo Ntakra
- Kool A.D.
- Kool G Rap
- Kool Herc
- Kool Keith
- Kool Moe Dee
- Kool Savas
- Kool Shen
- Koopsta Knicca
- Kore
- The Koreatown Oddity
- Korede Bello
- Koriass
- Kosha Dillz
- Kossisko
- Kota the Friend
- Kpanto
- Kraantje Pappie
- Krayzie Bone
- Krazy
- Kreayshawn
- Krisko
- Kris Kross
- Kris Wu
- Kristina Si
- Kristoff Krane
- Krizz Kaliko
- Krondon
- KRS-One
- KR$NA
- Krum
- KSI
- Kubilay Karça
- Kung Fu Vampire
- Kurdo
- Kuniva
- Kurious
- Kurtis Blow
- Kurtis Mantronik
- Kurupt
- KutMasta Kurt
- Kutt Calhoun
- Kwamé (American)
- Kwame (Australian)
- Kwayzar
- Kwengface
- Kwesi Arthur
- Kwesi Slay
- Kwesta
- Kxllswxtch
- Ky-Mani
- Kydd
- Kyle
- Kyle Massey
- Kyle Rapps
- Kyprios
- KZ Tandingan

== L ==
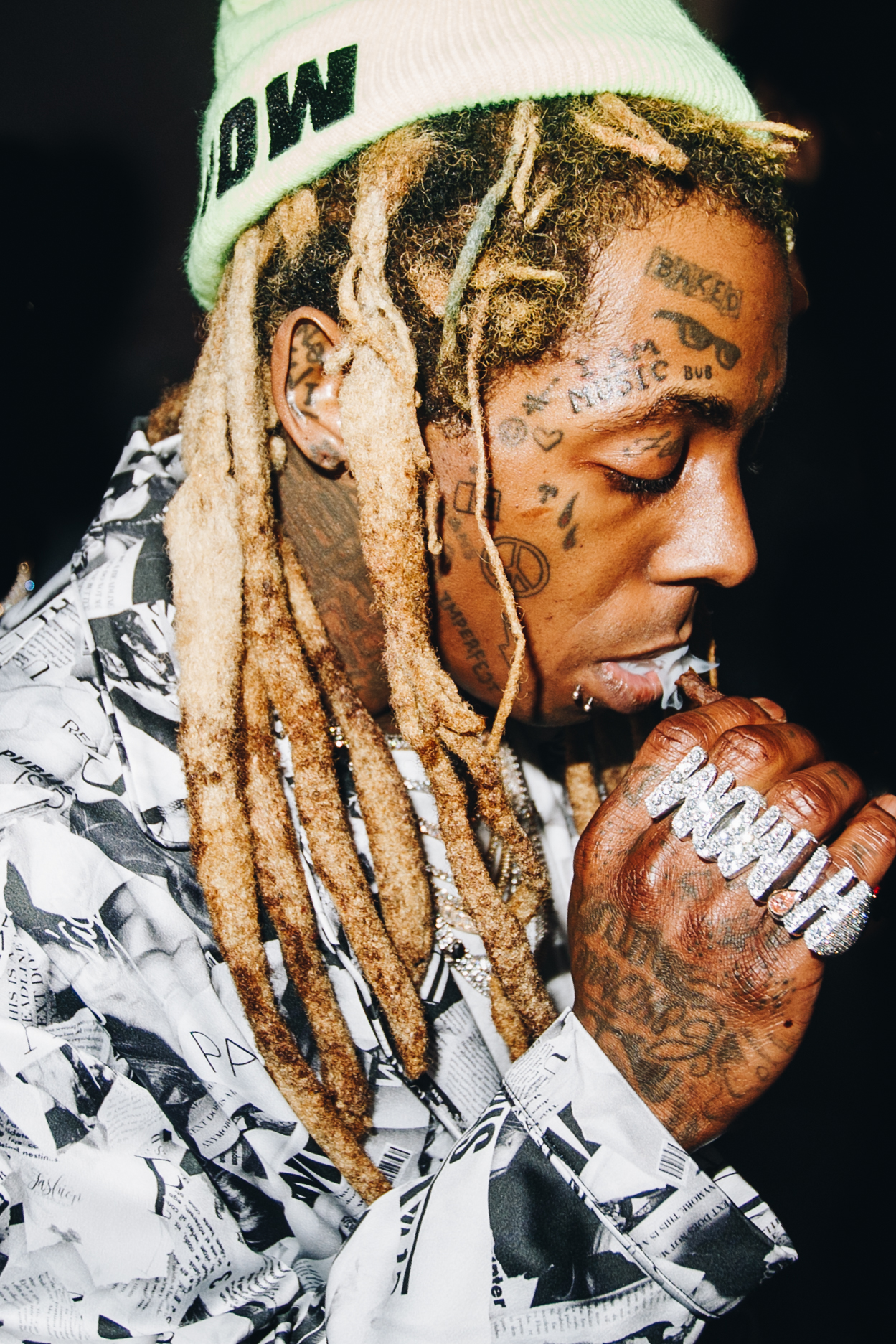
Lil Wayne

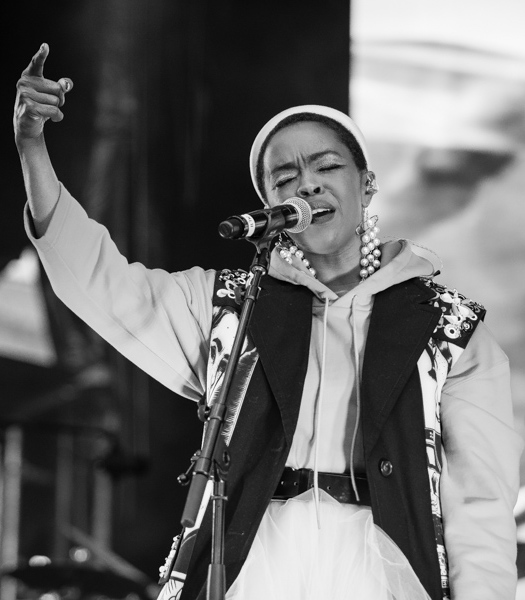
Lauryn Hill

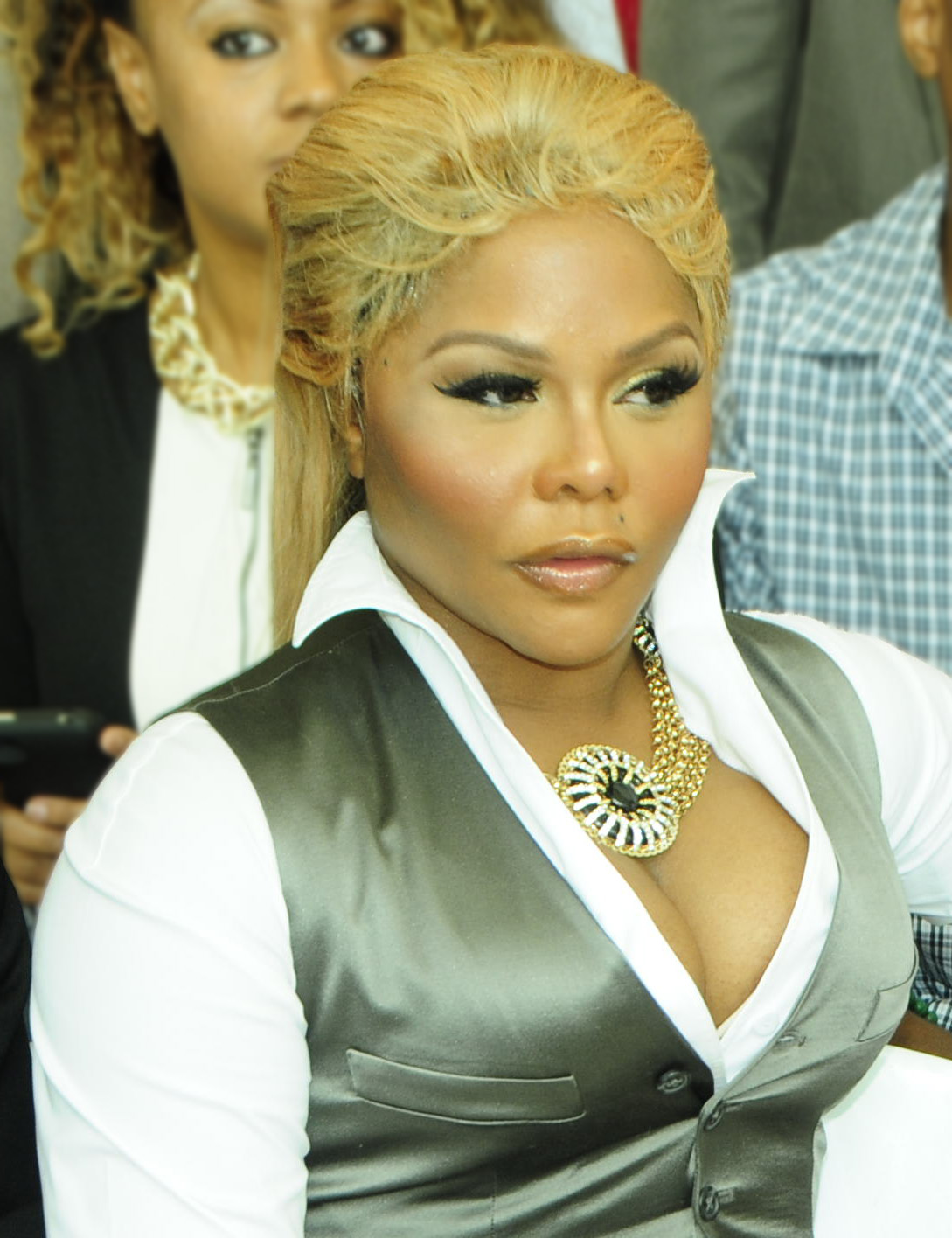
Lil' Kim

- LL Cool J
- L kat
- L-FRESH The LION
- L-Gante
- L-Tido
- L.E.G.A.C.Y.
- L.O.C.
- L.T. Hutton
- L.U.C
- La Chat
- La the Darkman
- La Fouine
- La Goony Chonga
- La Reezy
- LA Sunshine
- Labrinth
- Labtekwon
- Lacrim
- Ladipoe
- Lady
- Lady B
- Lady Crush
- Lady Donli
- Lady Kash
- Lady London
- Lady Luck
- Lady May
- The Lady of Rage
- Ladyfag
- Lakim Shabazz
- Lakeyah
- Lakutis
- Lali Espósito
- Lamix
- Lamont Sincere
- Lance Skiiiwalker
- Lancey Foux
- Landon Sears
- Landy
- Lanie Banks
- Lateef the Truthspeaker
- Large Professor
- Larray
- Larry
- Larry June
- Larry Larr
- Larry Smith
- Lartiste
- Lary
- Latto
- Laufer
- Laura Les
- Laure
- Lauri Pihlap
- Lauryn Hill
- Lava La Rue
- Lawsy
- Lay Bankz
- Laycon
- Laylizzy
- Laylow
- Layzie Bone
- Laza Morgan
- Lazarus
- Lazee
- Lazer Dim 700
- Lazerbeak
- Lazza
- Lbenj
- LD
- LDA
- LE
- LE SINNER
- Le'Veon Bell
- Le1f
- Leck
- Lecrae
- Lee Je-no
- Lee Jin-hyuk
- Lee Min-hyuk
- Lee on the Beats
- Lee Scott
- Lee Young-ji
- Leeah D. Jackson
- Leellamarz
- Leeroy Reed
- Lefa
- Left Brain
- Lefty Gunplay
- Leikeli47
- Left Eye
- Leila K
- Leo Aberer
- Lethal Bizzle
- Leto
- Lex Luger
- Lexa Gates
- Lexie Liu
- Lexii Alijai
- Lia Marie Johnson
- Lido
- Life MC
- Ligalize
- LightSkinKeisha
- Lijpe
- Lika Star
- Like
- Lil Aaron
- Lil B
- Lil Baby
- Lil Bibby
- Lil Bo Weep
- Lil Boi
- Lil C-Note
- Lil Darius
- Lil Debbie
- Lil Dicky
- Lil Double 0
- Lil Durk
- Lil Duval
- Lil Eazy-E
- Lil Flip
- Lil Ghost
- Lil Gnar
- Lil Gotit
- Lil Huddy
- Lil iROCC Williams
- Lil Jairmy
- Lil James
- Lil JoJo
- Lil Jon
- Lil JSean
- Lil Keed
- Lil Kesh
- Lil Loaded
- Lil Lotus
- Lil Mabu
- Lil Mama
- Lil Mariko
- Lil Meech
- Lil Mosey
- Lil Nas X
- Lil Pappie
- Lil Peep
- Lil Phat
- Lil Pump
- Lil Reese
- Lil Ric
- Lil Rob
- Lil Ru
- Lil Scrappy
- Lil Skies
- Lil Snupe
- Lil Tay
- Lil Tecca
- Lil Tjay
- Lil Tony (Georgia rapper)
- Lil Tracy
- Lil Twist
- Lil Ugly Mane
- Lil Uzi Vert
- Lil Wayne
- Lil Windex
- Lil Wop
- Lil Wyte
- Lil Xan
- Lil Yachty
- Lil Zane
- Lil Zay Osama
- Lil Zey
- Lil' Brianna
- Lil' C
- Lil' Cease
- Lil' Eddie
- Lil' Fizz
- Lil' Flip
- Lil' JJ
- Lil' Keke
- Lil' Kim
- Lil' Kleine
- Lil' Mo
- Lil' O
- Lil' Ronnie
- Lil' Troy
- Lil' Wil
- LIM
- Limoblaze
- Lin Que
- Linda Pira
- Lino
- Lio Rush
- Lionel D
- Lisa
- Lisa Maffia
- Lit Killah
- Little Simz
- Liu Yuxin
- Livio Cori
- Lizzo
- LL Cool J
- Lloyd
- Lloyd Banks
- Locksmith
- Loco
- Lodhi
- Loe Shimmy
- Logic
- Lojay
- Loki
- Lola Brooke
- LoLa Monroe
- Lolo Zouaï
- Lomepal
- Lon3r Johny
- London On Da Track
- Lonzo Ball
- Loon
- Loopy
- Lord Apex
- Lord Finesse
- Lord Have Mercy
- Lord Infamous
- Lord Jamar
- Lord Kossity
- Loredana Zefi
- Lorentz
- Lorenzo
- Los
- Loski
- Lou Phelps
- Loud
- Louie
- Louieville Sluggah
- Louis Logic
- Lous and the Yakuza
- Lovebug Starski
- LoveRance
- Lowkey
- Loyle Carner
- LRoc
- Lsdxoxo
- Lucas Wong
- Lucki
- Lucky Daye
- Luckyiam
- Ludacris
- Ludmilla
- Luh Kel
- Luh Tyler
- Luis Resto
- Luke Christopher
- Lumidee
- Lunar C
- Lunatik
- Lunay
- LunchMoney Lewis
- Luciano
- Luni Coleone
- Lunice
- Lupe Fiasco
- Lushlife
- LustSickPuppy
- Lute
- Luther Campbell
- Lyanno
- Lykke Li
- Lyldoll
- Lyrikal
- Lyrics Born

== M ==
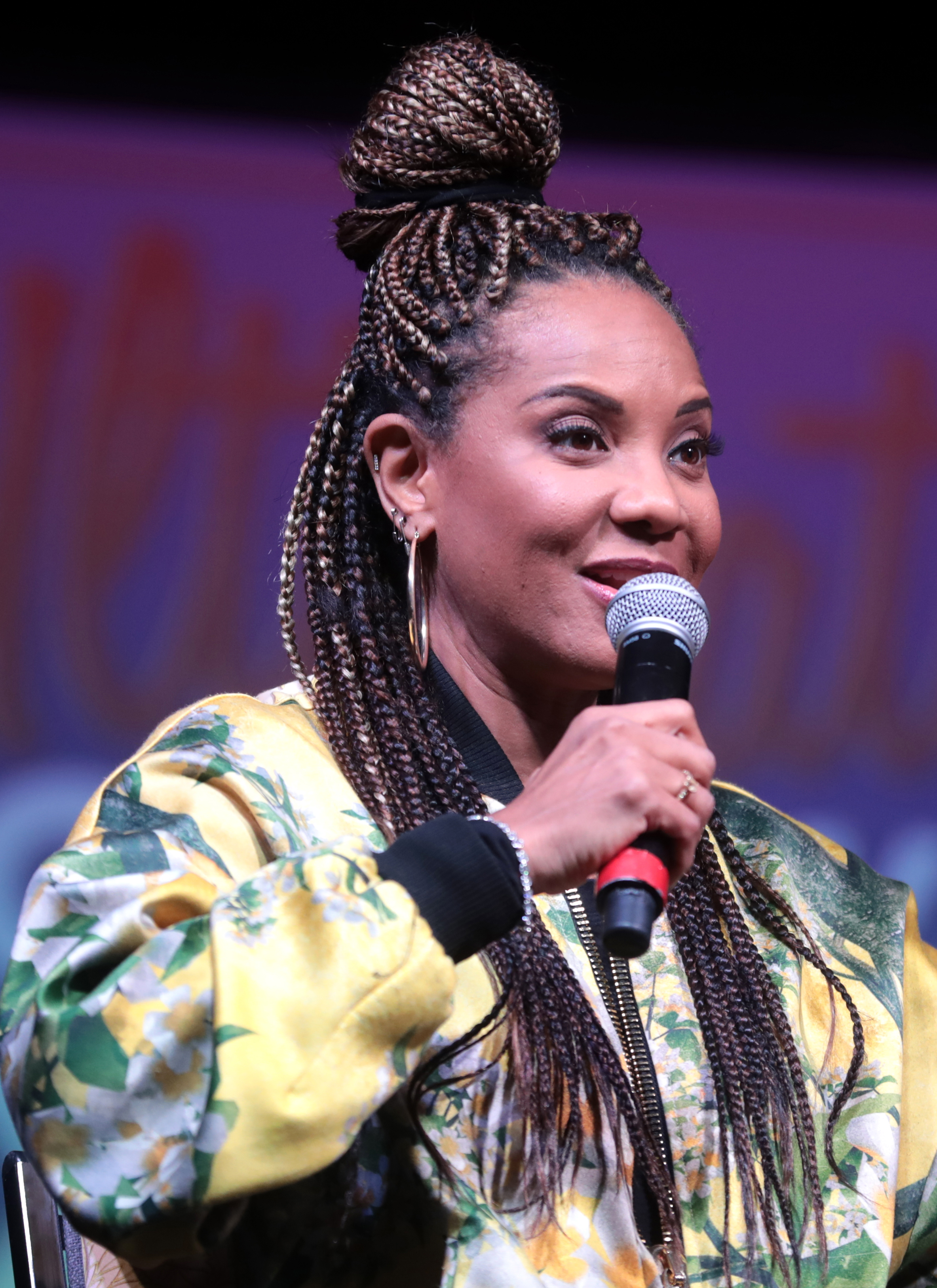
MC Lyte

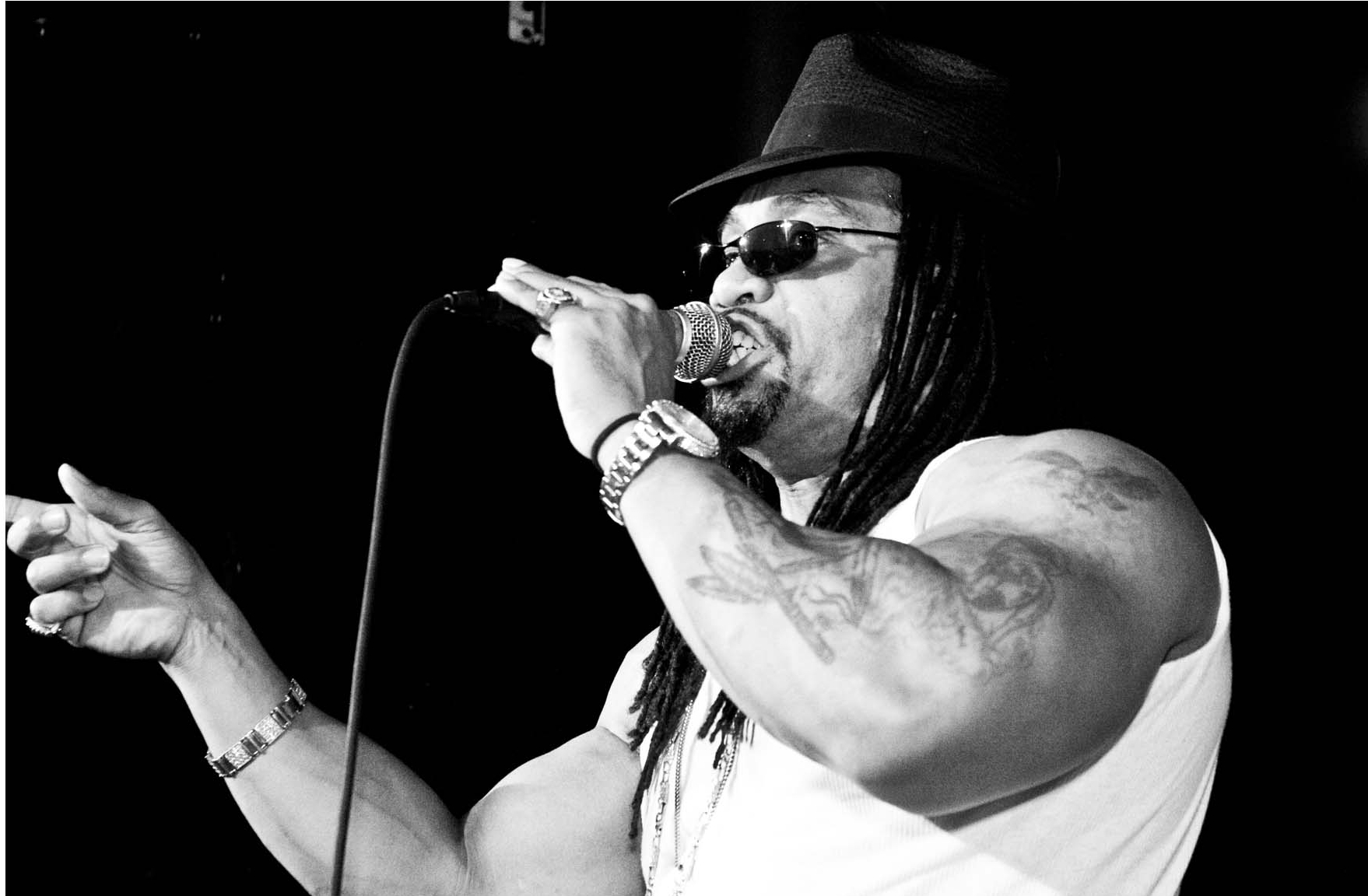
Melle Mel

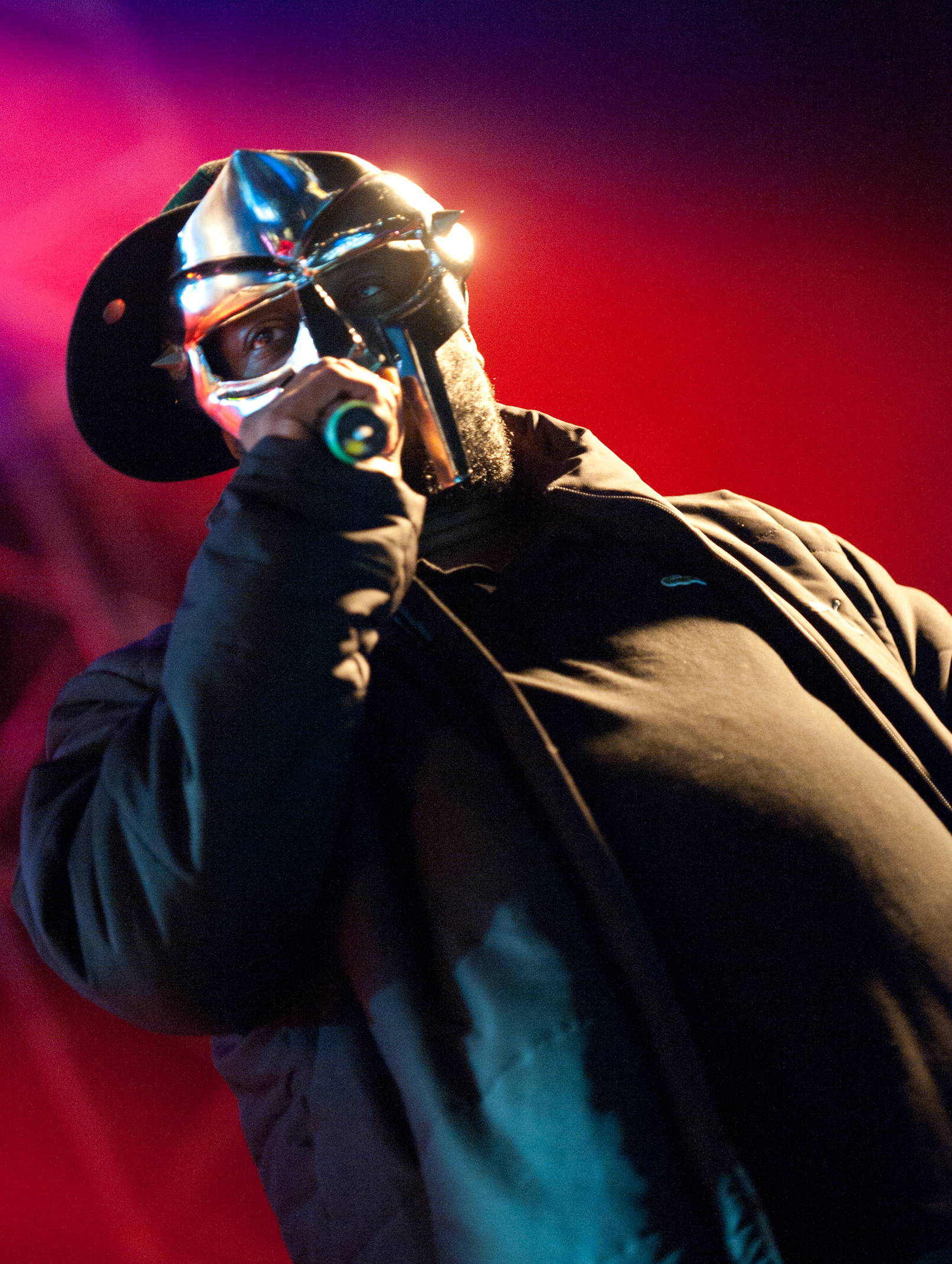
MF Doom

- M24
- M Dot R
- M Huncho
- M Lamar
- M Trill
- M-1
- M-City J.r.
- M-Dot
- M-Phazes
- M. Rivers
- M.E.D.
- M.I.A.
- M.I Abaga
- M1llionz
- Maaly Raw
- Mac
- Mac Dre
- Mac Lethal
- Mac Mall
- Mac Miller
- Mac Minister
- Mac Tyer
- Macan
- Maccasio
- Mach-Hommy
- Majoe
- Machine Gun Kelly
- Mack 10
- Mack Maine
- Macklemore
- Macnivil
- Mad Skillz
- Madame
- MadeinTYO
- Madh
- Madman
- Mad Clown
- Mad Lion
- Madchild
- Madlib
- Maejor Ali
- Maes
- Maestro Fresh Wes
- Maggz
- Magic
- Magik
- Maglera Doe Boy
- Magnolia Shorty
- Mahmood
- Mahogany Jones
- Mahoto Watanabe
- Maimouna Youssef
- Maine Event
- Maino
- Maiya The Don
- Major Nine
- Mala Rodríguez
- Malcolm David Kelley
- Malcolm Mays
- Maliibu Miitch
- Malik B.
- Malinga Mafia
- Małolat
- Maluma
- MamboLosco
- Manafest
- Manchild
- Mandela Van Peebles
- Mann
- Mannie Fresh
- Manny Marc
- Mano Brown
- Manu Crooks
- Manuel Turizo
- Marčelo
- Marcelo D2
- Marco Polo
- Mareko
- Mariah Angeliq
- Mariah Carey
- Mariah Parker
- Mariah the Scientist
- Mario Judah
- Mark B
- Mark Batson
- Mark Battles
- Mark Grist
- Mark Lee
- Mark Tuan
- Marky Mark
- Markoolio
- Markul
- Marky
- Marley Marl
- Marlon Craft
- Marques Houston
- Marracash
- Mars
- Marteria
- Martse
- Marty
- Marty Baller
- Marty James
- Marv Won
- Marvaless
- Marwa Loud
- Marwan Moussa
- Marwan Pablo
- Marysia Starosta
- Marz
- Marz Lovejoy
- Mase
- Masego
- Maseo
- Masia One
- Maska
- Masked Wolf
- Massaka
- Massimo Pericolo
- Massiv
- Masspike Miles
- Masta Ace
- Masta Killa
- Mastamind
- Master Gee
- Master P
- Master Shortie
- Mata
- Mateo Arias
- Mathematics
- Matisyahu
- Matrang
- Matt Champion
- Matt Martians
- Matt Ox
- Matt Toka
- MattyBRaps
- Matuê
- Maverick Sabre
- Mavi
- Max B
- Max Herre
- Maxo Kream
- Maxsta
- Maya Jupiter
- Mayam Mahmoud
- Mayne Mannish
- Mayorkun
- Mayot
- MC 900 Ft. Jesus
- MC Bin Laden
- MC Breed
- MC Caro
- MC Carol
- MC Ceja
- MC Chris
- MC Daleste
- MC Davo
- MC Eiht
- MC Frontalot
- MC Guimê
- MC Hammer
- MC Jazzy Jeff
- MC Jin
- MC Kash
- MC Kevin
- MC Lars
- MC Lon
- MC Lyte
- MC Marechal
- MC Magic
- MC Mong
- MC Paul Barman
- MC Pressure
- MC Ren
- MC Rene
- MC Ride
- MC Serch
- MC Shan
- MC Stan
- MC Solaar
- MC Tee
- MC Tha
- MC Trouble
- MC Tunes
- MC Yankoo
- MCA
- McKay
- McKinley Dixon
- MCVertt
- MD&C Pavlov
- Me Phi Me
- Médine
- Medikal
- Meechy Darko
- Meek Mill
- Meekz
- Megan Thee Stallion
- Mehmet Aydın
- Mekka Don
- Melinda Ademi
- Melle Mel
- Mellow Man Ace
- Melodownz
- Memphis Bleek
- Ménélik
- Mercedes
- Mereba
- Meridian Dan
- Merkules
- Merky ACE
- Merlin
- Merlyn Wood
- Mero
- Messiah
- Messy Marv
- Method Man
- Metro Boomin
- Mexicano 777
- Meyhem Lauren
- Mez
- MF Doom
- MF Grimm
- MHD
- Mi Sandi
- Mia Khalifa
- Mia X
- MiBBs
- Mic Geronimo
- Mic Jordan
- Michael Bivins
- Michael Dapaah
- Michael Franti
- Michael Millions
- Michael Peace
- Michael Swissa
- Michael Wavves
- Michel'le
- MICK
- Mick Jenkins
- Mick Luter
- Mickey Avalon
- Mickey Factz
- Mickey Lightfoot
- Micro TDH
- Microdot
- Midel
- Midwxst
- Miilkbone
- Mika Singh
- MIKE
- Mike D
- Mike Dean
- Mike Dimes
- Mike G
- Mike Jones
- Mike Ladd
- Mike Mictlan
- Mike Patton
- Mike Posner
- Mike Shinoda
- Mike Skinner
- Mike Stud
- Mike Will Made It
- Mike Zombie
- Mikey D
- Miky Woodz
- Milli
- Mila J
- Miles Bridges
- Miles Minnick
- Milo
- Milo J
- Mimi Mercedez
- Mimiks
- Mims
- Mino
- Minzy
- Miracle
- Mirani
- Miri Ben-Ari
- Miriam Bryant
- Miryo
- Misha B
- MISSPSTAR
- Misho
- Miss Eighty 6
- Miss Raisa
- Missy Elliott
- Mist
- Mista Grimm
- Mista Silva
- Mistah F.A.B.
- Mister Cee
- Mister V
- Mister You
- Mi$tro
- Mitchy Slick
- Mithra Jin
- Mitsuhiro Hidaka
- Mizchif
- MLMA
- Mndsgn
- MNEK
- Mo Sabri
- Mo'Cheddah
- Mo'Molemi
- MO3
- Mo B. Dick
- Mod Sun
- Mode 9
- Moha La Squale
- MohBad
- Moka Only
- Mokobé
- Molly Santana
- Molodoj Platon
- Momo Hirai
- Monaleo
- Moncho
- Money-B
- Money Boy
- Money Man
- Moneybagg Yo
- Monie Love
- Monica
- Monifah
- Monoxide Child
- Monski
- Montana of 300
- Monte Booker
- Montell Jordan
- Monty
- Monzy
- Mooki
- Moor Mother
- Mooski
- Moozlie
- Mopreme Shakur
- Morad
- More or Les
- Morena Leraba
- Morgenshtern
- Morray
- Morrisson
- Moses Pelham
- Moshe Reuven
- MoStack
- Mot
- MoTrip
- Mozee Montana
- Mozzik
- Mozzy
- MP808
- Mpura
- Mr Eazi
- Mr Real
- Mr. 3-2
- Mr. Capone-E
- Mr. Catra
- Mr. Cheeks
- Mr. Collipark
- Mr. Del
- Mr Drew
- Mr. Envi'
- Mr. Gângster
- Mr. II
- Mr. J. Medeiros
- Mr. Len
- Mr. Leo
- Mr. Lif
- Mr. Magic
- Mr. Marcelo
- Mr. Muthafuckin' eXquire
- Mr. P
- Mr. Porter
- Mr. Serv-On
- Mr. Rain
- Mr. Short Khop
- Mr. TalkBox
- Mr. Vegas
- Ms Banks
- Ms. Dynamite
- Ms. Jade
- Ms. Melodie
- Mudd the Student
- Mugeez
- Mumzy Stranger
- Munachi Abii
- Munawar Faruqui
- Muneshine
- Murda
- Murda Beatz
- Murda Mook
- Murphy Lee
- Murs
- Musiko
- MV Bill
- mxmtoon
- Myaap
- Mykki Blanco
- Myka 9
- Myke Towers
- Myss Keta
- Myst Milano
- Mystikal
- Myzery
- Mz Kiss

== N ==
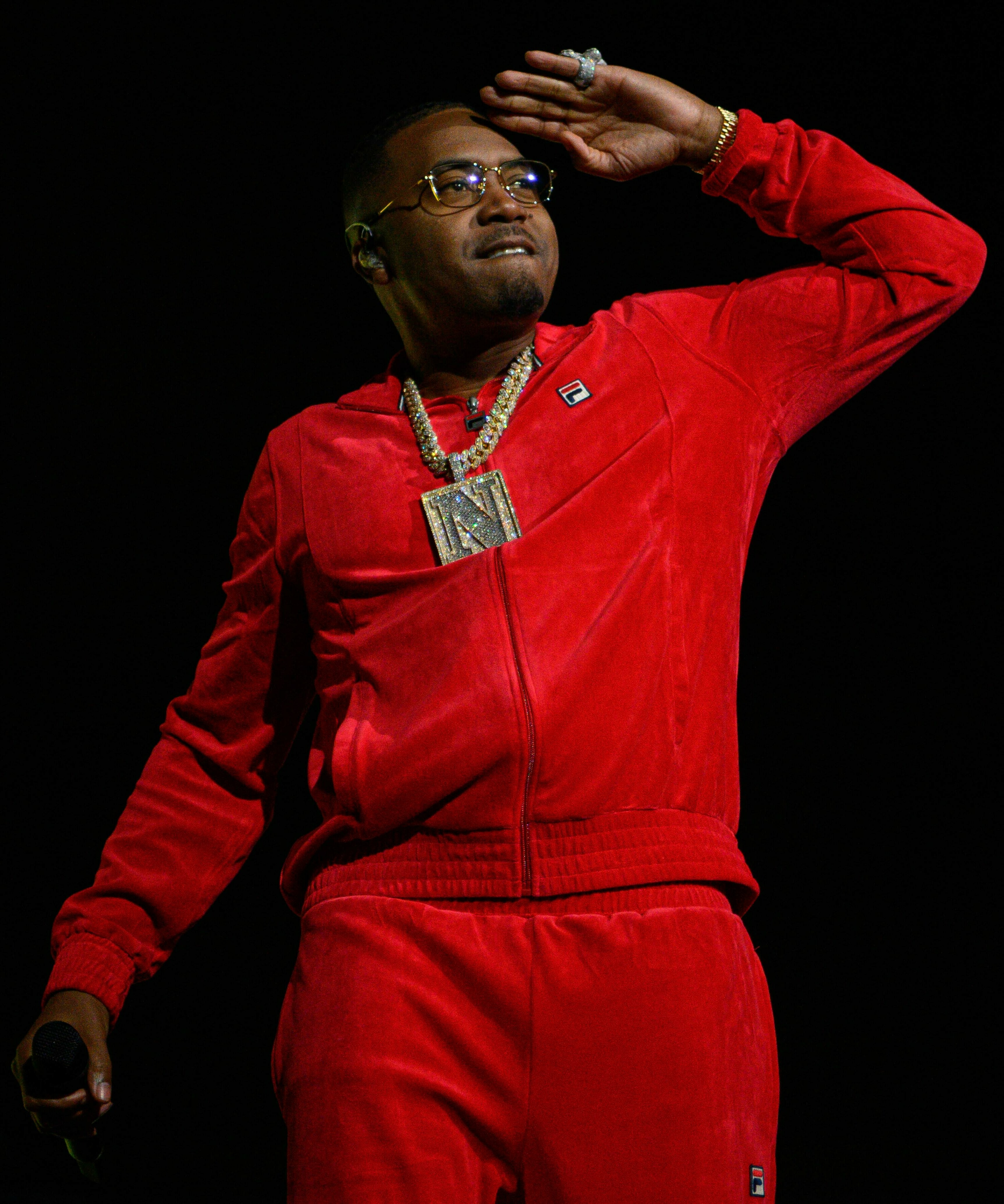
Nas

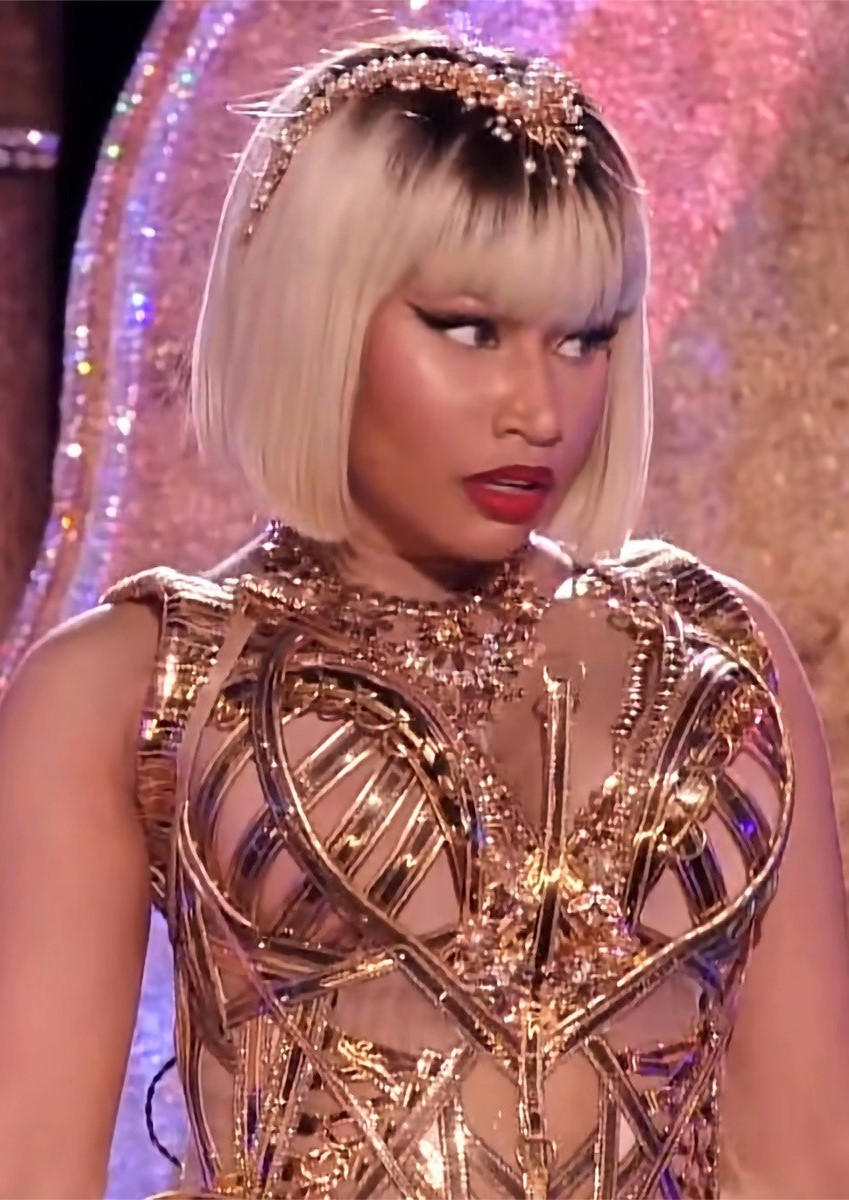
Nicki Minaj

- N'fa
- N.O. Joe
- N.O.R.E.
- N.O.S
- Na Jae-min
- Na-Kel Smith
- Näääk
- Nach
- Nada
- Nadia Nakai
- Nadia Oh
- Nadia Rose
- Nadia Tehran
- Nadine El Roubi
- Naeto C
- Naezy
- Nafe Smallz
- Nafla
- Nafsi Huru
- Nah Eeto
- Naira Marley
- Naledge
- Namika
- Nate Husser
- Nathy Peluso
- Napoleon
- Nappy Nina
- Naps
- Nardo Wick
- Nas
- Nasty C
- Natan
- Natanael Cano
- Natasja Saad
- Nate Dogg
- Nate Porcalla
- Nathaniel Motte
- Nature
- Nav
- Navio
- Navy Blue
- Naya Ali
- Nayoung
- Nayt
- Naza
- Nazar
- Ne-Yo
- Nebu Kiniza
- Necro
- Needlz
- Nef the Pharaoh
- Neffa
- Negra Li
- Nekfeu
- Nelly
- Nelly Furtado
- Nemo
- Nemzzz
- Ñengo Flow
- Nenny
- Neo da Matrix
- Népal
- Nerone
- Nesli
- Nessbeal
- Nessly
- Nettspend
- Newkid
- NF
- Nia Keturah Calhoun
- Niarn
- Nic Nac
- Nicholas Loftin
- Nick Cannon
- Nick de la Hoyde
- Nick Hexum
- Nick Mira
- Nickelus F
- Nicky Jam
- Nicki Minaj
- Nicki Nicole
- Nicky da B
- Nico Segal
- Nicole Wray
- Niello
- Night Lovell
- Nigo
- Nik Makino
- Nikki D
- Niko B
- Niko Is
- Nimo
- Nina Chuba
- Nine
- Nine Vicious
- Nines
- Ninho
- Ninja
- Nino Paid
- Nipsey Hussle
- Nirnaya Shrestha
- Niro
- Niska
- Nissim Black
- Nito-P
- Nitro
- Nitti Beatz
- Nitty
- Nitty Scott
- Njena Reddd Foxxx
- NLE Choppa
- Nneka
- NO:EL
- No Malice
- Noah Cyrus
- Noah Munck
- Nobody
- NoCap
- Nocando
- NoClue
- Node
- NOE
- No I.D.
- Noize MC
- Noizy
- Noname
- Nonchalant
- Nonini
- Noriel
- NorthSideBenji
- Nosson Zand
- Not3s
- Nothing,Nowhere
- The Notorious B.I.G.
- Notti Osama
- Nottz
- Nova Rockafeller
- Novelist
- Noyz Narcos
- Nqrse
- Nublu
- Nucci
- Nucksal
- Nujabes
- Numskull
- Nura
- NYOIL

== O ==
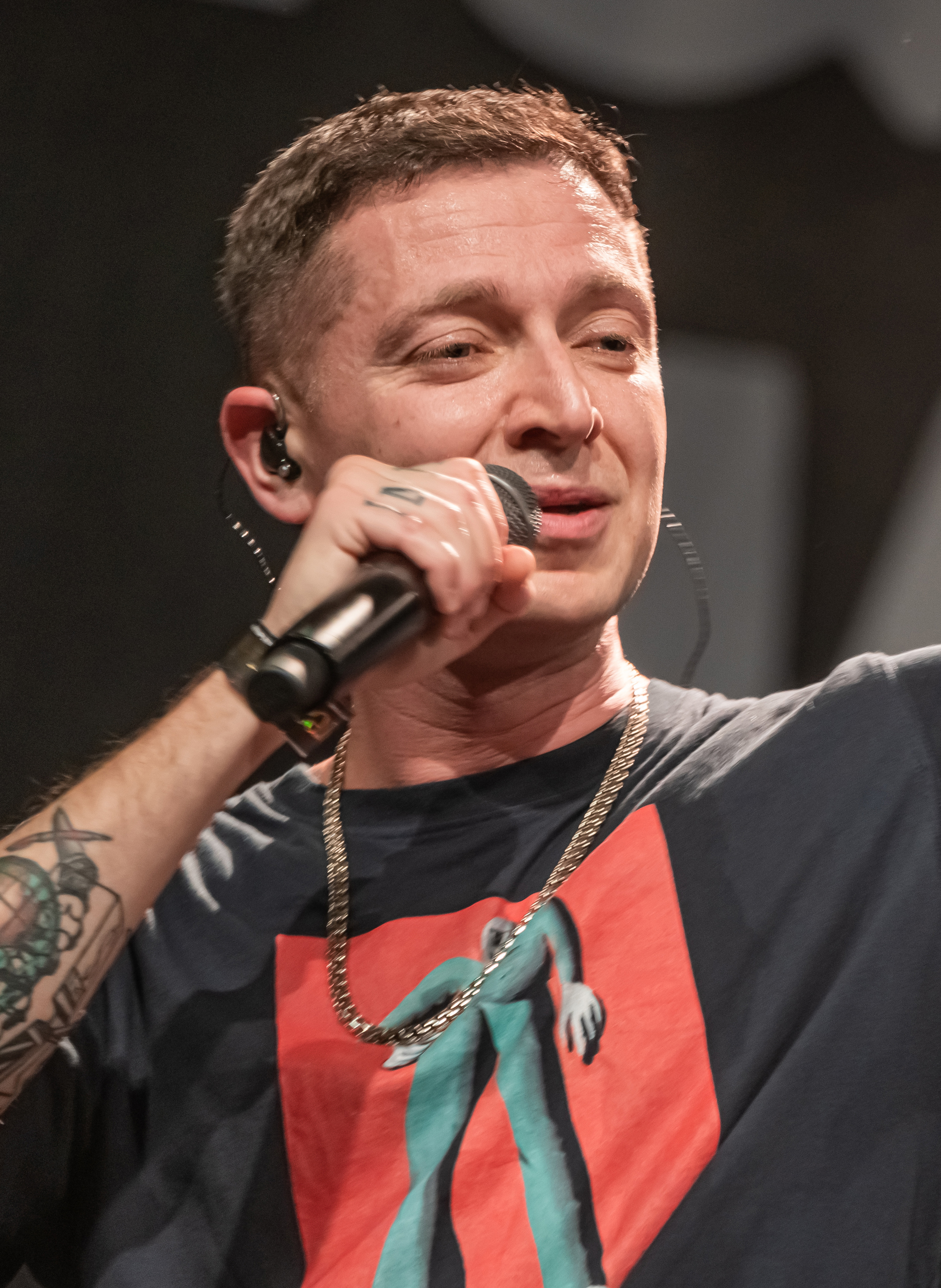
Oxxxymiron

- O'Kenneth
- O.C.
- O.S.T.R.
- O.T. Genasis
- O.Y.G Redrum 781
- Obie Trice
- Oboy
- Ocean Wisdom
- Octavian
- Odetari
- Odd Nosdam
- Oddisee
- Odumodublvck
- Offica
- Offset
- OG Boo Dirty
- OG Maco
- OG Parker
- OG Ron C
- Oh No
- OhGeesy
- Ohmega Watts
- OJ da Juiceman
- Okasian
- Okese1
- Oki
- Okmalumkoolkat
- Ol' Dirty Bastard
- Olamide
- Oleh Psiuk
- Oliver Tree
- Olivia
- Oliwka Brazil
- Olltii
- Olly
- Olumide Oworu
- Omah Lay
- Omar Epps
- Omarion
- OMB Bloodbath
- OMB Peezy
- Omega Crosby
- Omen
- OmenXIII
- OMG
- Omid Walizadeh
- Omillio Sparks
- Onar
- L'One
- One
- One Be Lo
- Oneself
- Onry Ozzborn
- Oompa
- Open Mike Eagle
- Opio
- L'Orange
- Orelsan
- Oreo Jones
- Organik
- Orgasmic
- Orgi-E
- Ori Murray
- Orikal Uno
- Orko Eloheim
- Orlando Brown
- Oryn the Rebel
- OsamaSon
- Osez
- Osh
- Oskar Linnros
- OSN
- Otis Mensah
- Outasight
- Outsider
- Overlord X
- Overweight Pooch
- Ovi
- Ovrkast
- Oxmo Puccino
- Oxxxymiron
- Oz
- ØZI
- Ozuna

== P ==
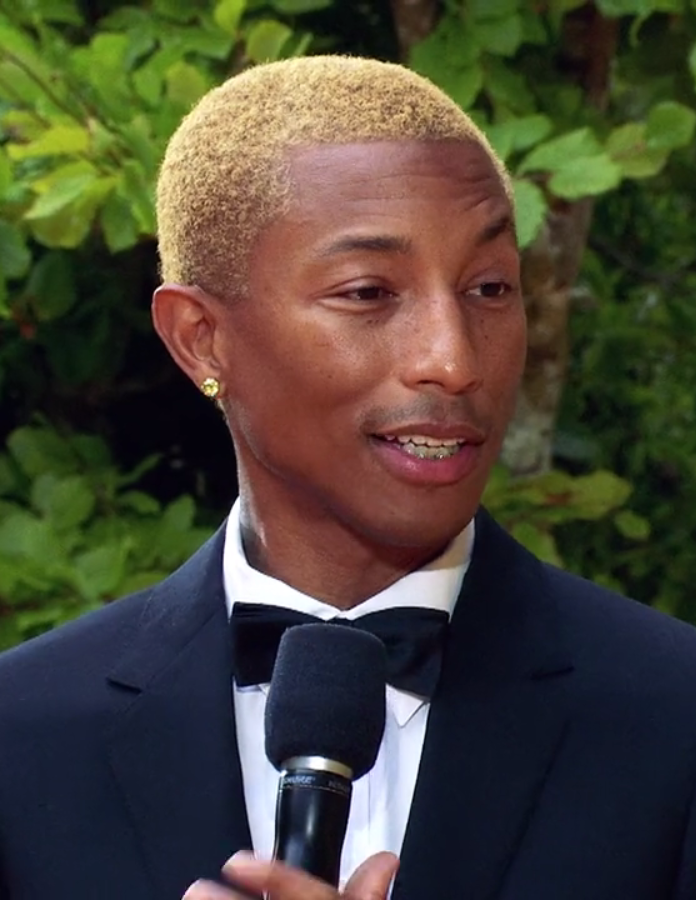
Pharrell Williams

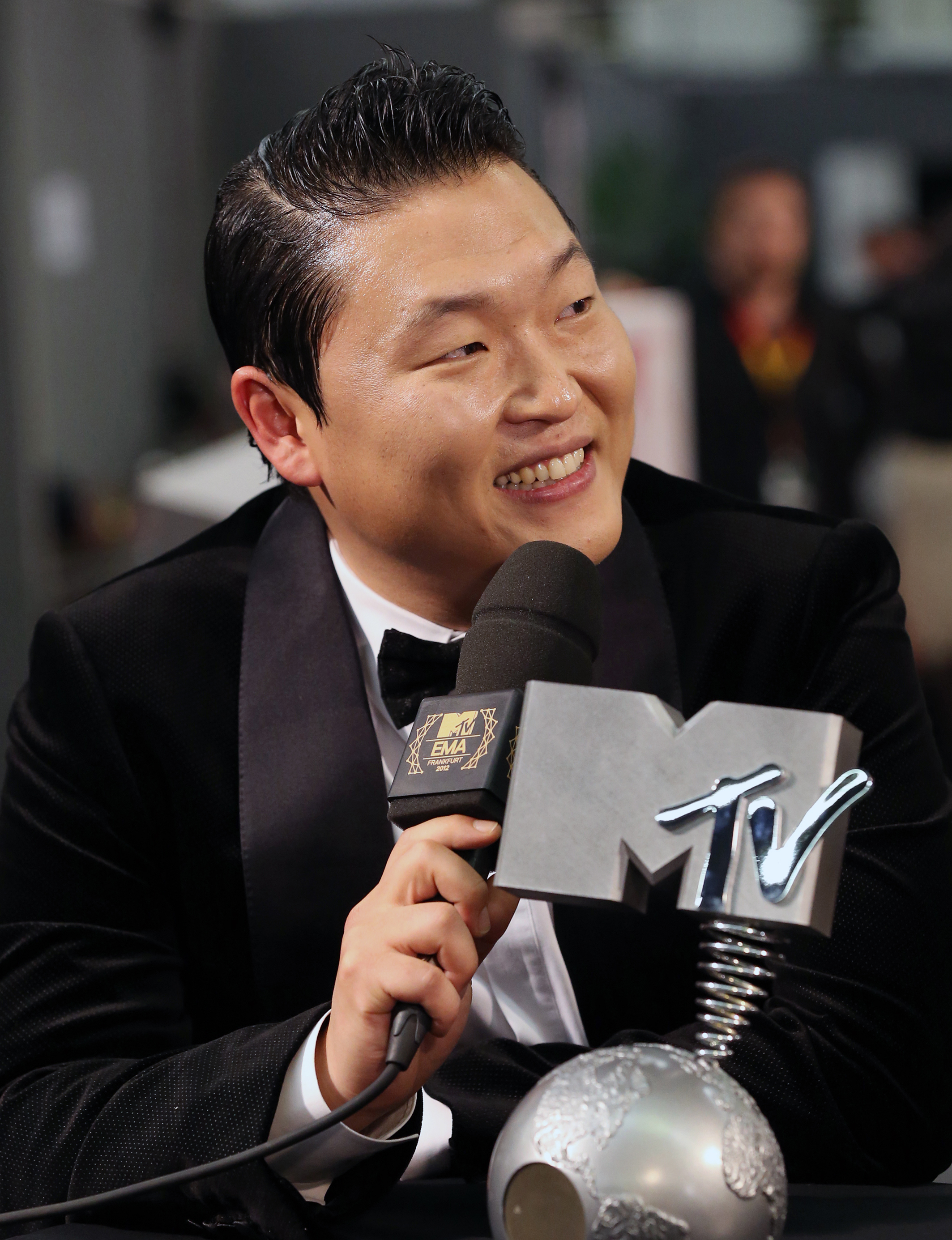
Psy

- P Money
- P.C.T
- P.O
- P.O.S
- Pa Salieu
- Pablo Grant
- Pacewon
- Pacho El Antifeka
- Paigey Cakey
- Paky
- Pale
- Pallaso
- Paloalto
- Paloma Mami
- Pap Chanel
- Papa Dee
- Papa Reu
- Paper Tiger
- Papoose
- Pappy Kojo
- Paradime
- Paradise Sorouri
- Pardison Fontaine
- Park Kyung
- Paris
- PARTYNEXTDOOR
- Pashanim
- Passi
- Pastor Troy
- Patron
- Patron the DepthMC
- Paul C
- Paul Rosenberg
- Paul Russell
- Paul Wall
- Paulo Londra
- Pavlos Fyssas
- Pawzz
- Peabod
- Peace
- Peaches
- Peanut Butter Wolf
- Pedestrian
- Peedi Peedi
- Peewee Longway
- Peja
- Peniel Shin
- Penomeco
- Pep Love
- Pepa
- Pepenazi
- Peppermint
- Percee P
- Peso Pluma
- Pete Cannon
- Pete Davidson
- Pete Miser
- Pete Nice
- Pete Rock
- Petey Pablo
- Petra Bockle
- Petter
- Pettidee
- Peyton Alex Smith
- Pezet
- pH-1
- Pháo
- Pharaoh
- Pharoahe Monch
- Pharrell Williams
- Phat Kat
- Pheelz
- Phesto
- Phife Dawg
- Philly Swain
- Philthy Rich
- Phonte
- Phora
- Phresher
- Phyno
- Pi'erre Bourne
- Pierre Kwenders
- Pigeon John
- Pill
- Pimp C
- Pink Guy
- Pink Siifu
- Pip Skid
- Piri
- Piruka
- Pitbull
- PJ Sin Suela
- Plaisir Bahamboula
- Plan B
- Planet Asia
- Planetary
- Plato III
- Playa Fly
- Playboi Carti
- Plies
- PLK
- Pluss
- PMD
- PnB Rock
- PNC
- Pocah
- Poe
- Polimá Westcoast
- Polo G
- Polow da Don
- Pooh Shiesty
- Poorstacy
- Pop Smoke
- Pop Young
- Popek
- Popp Hunna
- Porta
- Portable
- Posdnuos
- Positive K
- Post Malone
- Poster Boy
- Potter Payper
- Pouya
- Powfu
- Ppcocaine
- Prabh Deep
- Pras
- Preme
- Pressa
- Presto
- Prettifun
- Prettyboy D-O
- Prevail
- Priestess
- Primary
- Primo Brown
- Prince Harvey
- Prince Ital Joe
- Prince Markie Dee
- Prince Paul
- Prince Po
- Prince Taee
- Prince Whipper Whip
- Princess Nokia
- Princess Superstar
- Princess Vitarah
- Pro
- Problem
- Prodezra
- Prodigal Sunn
- Prodigy
- Prof
- Professor Green
- Professor X the Overseer
- ProfJam
- Project Pat
- Prolyphic
- Promoe
- Proof
- Propaganda
- Prozak
- Psy
- Psychosiz
- PsychoYP
- Ptaha
- Ptazeta
- Puffy L'z
- Pumpkinhead
- Punch
- Punchmade Dev
- Punchnello
- Pusha T
- Pusho
- Pvrx
- Pyramid Vritra

== Q ==
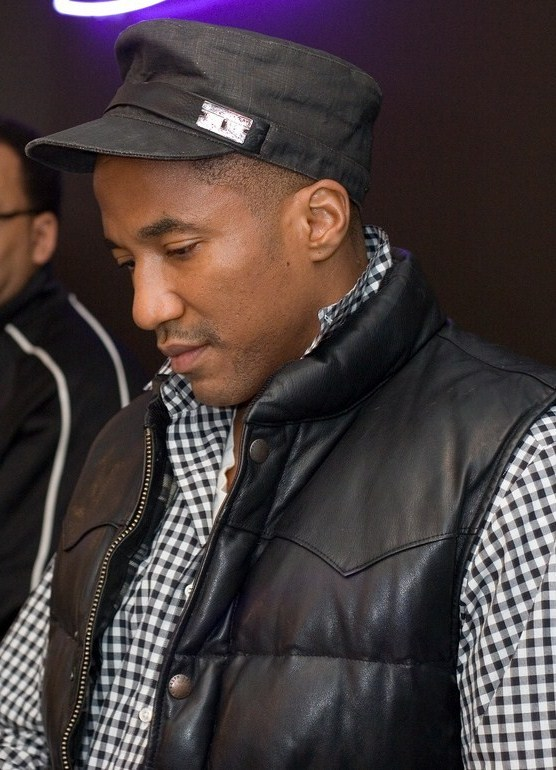
Q-Tip

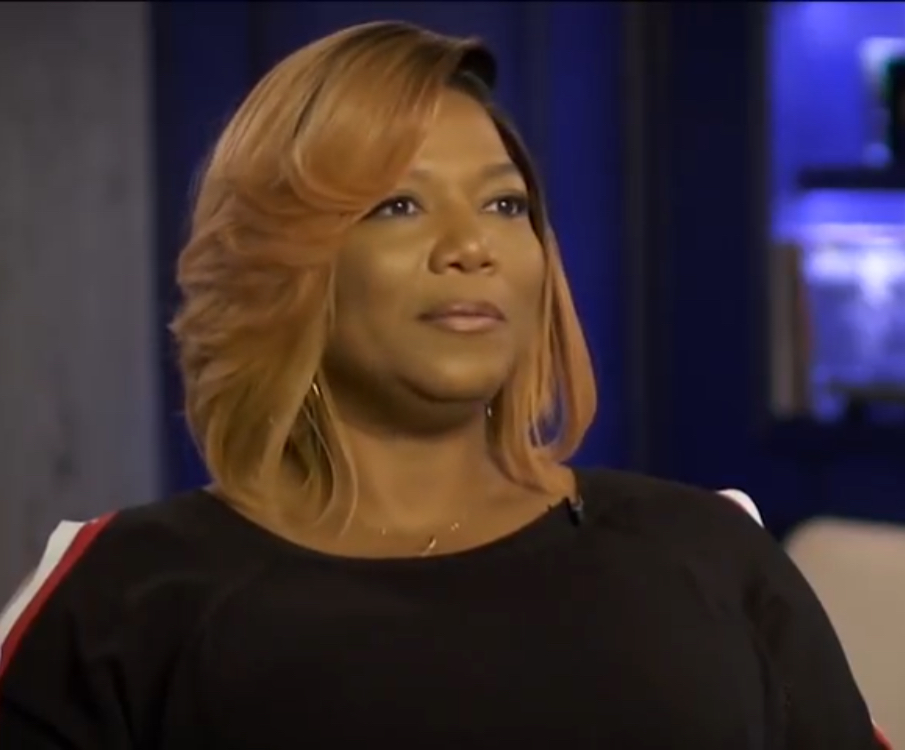
Queen Latifah

- Q052
- Q Da Fool
- Q-Tip
- Q-Unique
- Qin Fen
- Qry
- Quadeca
- Quamina MP
- Quan
- Quando Rondo
- Quavo
- Quay Dash
- Quazedelic
- Quebonafide
- Queen Latifah
- Queen Naija
- Queen Pen
- Quelle Chris
- QuESt
- Questlove
- Quevedo
- The Quiett
- Quin NFN
- Quincy Jones III
- quinn
- Qwazaar
- Qwel

== R ==
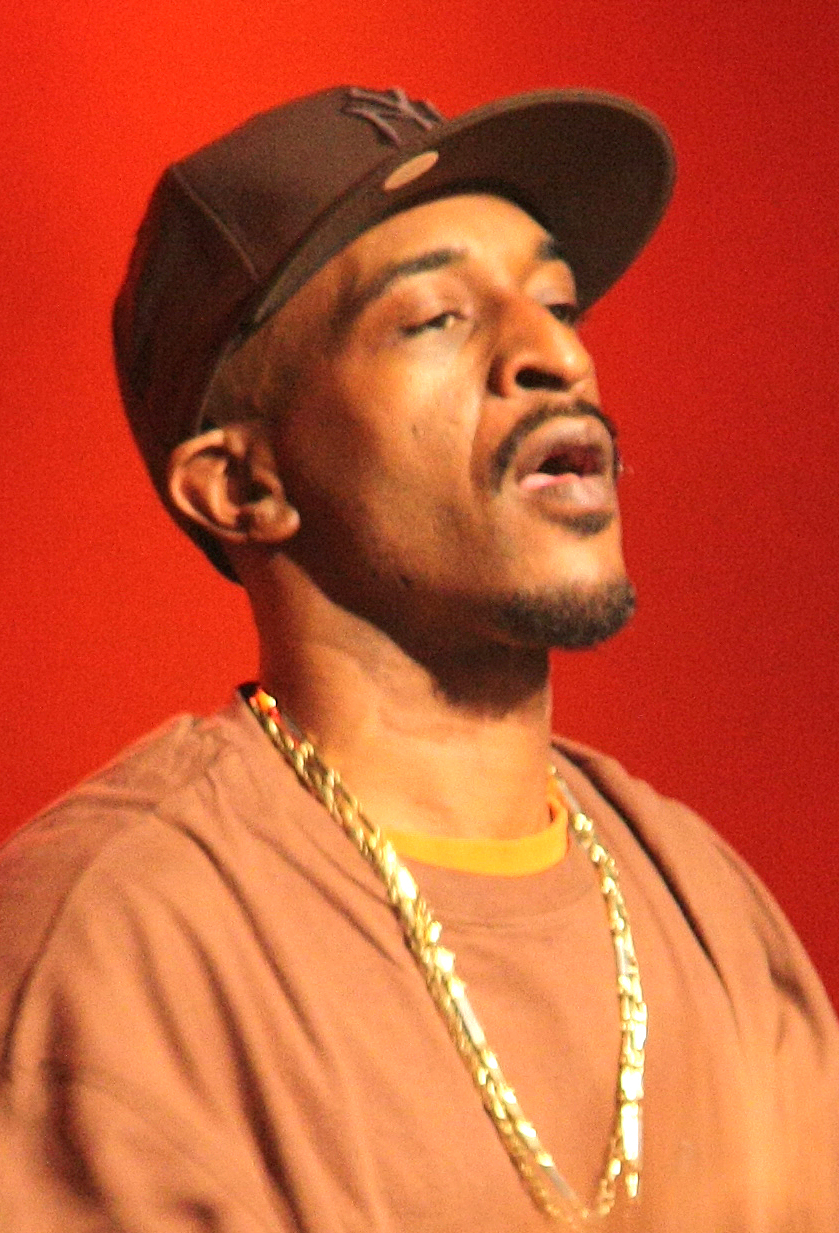
Rakim

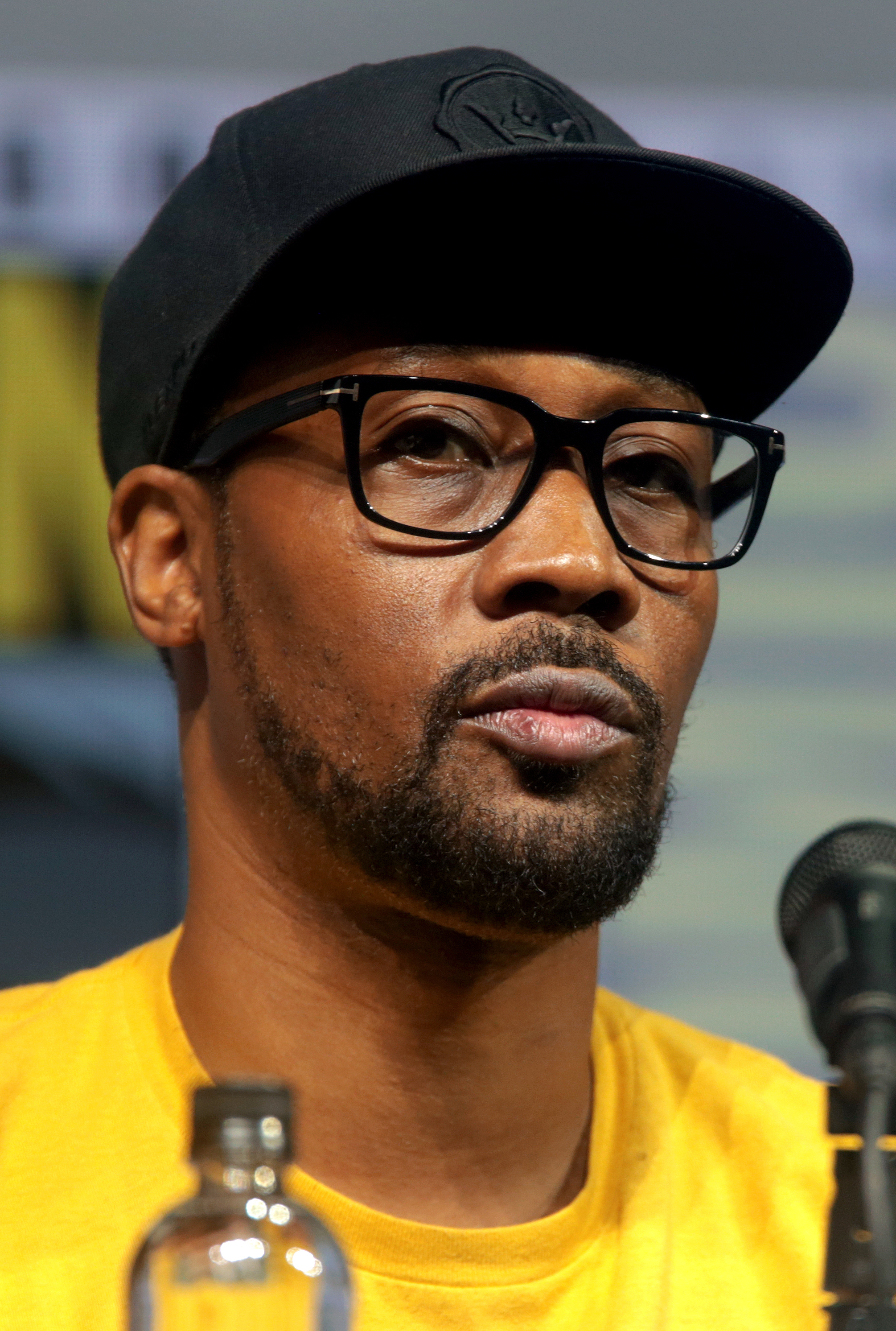
RZA

- R. Kelly
- R. Prophet
- R.A. the Rugged Man
- Racine Kamatari
- Radioinactive
- Raekwon
- RAF Camora
- Rafael Leão
- Raftaar
- Rah Digga
- Rah Swish
- Raheem Jarbo
- Rahim
- Rahki
- Rahzel
- Raja Kumari
- Rakeem Miles
- Rakhim
- Rakim
- Ralo
- Rameez
- Ramey Dawoud
- Ramez
- Ramil'
- Ramirez
- Rampage
- Ramz
- Rancore
- Randa
- Random
- R.A.P. Ferreira
- Rappin' 4-Tay
- Rappin' Hood
- Rapsody
- Ras G
- Ras Kass
- Rasco
- Rashad Smith
- Rasheeda
- El Rass
- Le Rat Luciano
- Raury
- Rauw Alejandro
- Ravi
- Ravyn Lenae
- Raxstar
- Ray BLK
- Ray Cash
- Ray J
- Ray Luv
- Ray Vaughn
- Rayne Storm
- Rayven Justice
- Raz Fresco
- Raz Simone
- RBX
- Real Boston Richey
- The Real Roxanne
- Real.be
- Reason (American)
- Reason (Australian)
- Reason (British)
- Reason (South African)
- Rebel MC
- Reble
- Reconcile
- Red Café
- Red Cloud
- Red Spyda
- Reddy
- Redfoo
- Redinho
- Redman
- Redzz
- Redveil
- Reef the Lost Cauze
- Reema Major
- Rejjie Snow
- Reks
- Rels B
- Rema
- Remble
- Reminisce
- Rémy
- Remy Ma
- Ren Gill
- Renni Rucci
- Reol
- Residente
- Rexx Life Raj
- Rex Orange County
- Reveal
- Rhymefest
- Rhove
- RiceGum
- Rich Amiri
- Rich Boy
- Rich Brian
- Rich Homie Quan
- Rich Kidd
- Rich The Kid
- Richie Branson
- Richie Rich
- Rick Rock
- Rick Ross
- Ricky Rich
- Rico Love
- Rico Nasty
- Rico Recklezz
- Rico Rossi
- Ridgio
- Ridsa
- Riff Raff
- Rihanna
- Riky Rick
- Rilès
- Rim'K
- Rimzee
- RIN
- Rina Balaj
- Rinne Yoshida
- Rio da Yung OG
- RiotUSA
- Risa Tsumugi
- Rishi Rich
- Rishiking
- Rittz
- Riz Ahmed
- RJ
- RJD2
- Rkomi
- RM
- RMR
- Ro James
- Ro Ransom
- Roach Gigz
- Rob49
- Rob Lewis
- Rob Sonic
- Rob Stone
- Rob Swift
- Robb Bank$
- Robert Waller
- Roc Marciano
- Roc Raida
- Rocca
- Rocco Hunt
- RoccStar
- Rockie Fresh
- Rockin' Squat
- Rocko
- Rockwell Knuckles
- Rockwilder
- Rod Lee
- Rod Wave
- Roddy Ricch
- Rodney P
- Roger Troutman
- Rohff
- Roi Heenok
- Roll Rida
- Rome Cee
- Rome Fortune
- Rome Streetz
- Roméo Elvis
- Romeo Miller
- Ron Browz
- Ron Suno
- Rondodasosa
- RondoNumbaNine
- Ronnie DeVoe
- Ronnie Flex
- Ronnie Radke
- Ronny J
- Roots Manuva
- Rosa Chemical
- Rosa Ree
- Roscoe
- Roscoe Dash
- Roshelle
- Roshon Fegan
- Rouge
- Rowdy Rebel
- Roxanne Shanté
- Roy
- Roy Purdy
- Roy Woods
- Royce da 5'9"
- Rozonda Thomas
- RRose RRome
- RS
- Rubi Rose
- Rudeboy
- Rucka Rucka Ali
- Ruggedman
- Runtown
- Russ
- Russ Millions
- Russell Simmons
- Ruudolf
- Ruyonga
- RV
- Rvssian
- RXK Nephew
- Rxseboy
- Ryan Celsius
- Ryan Lewis
- Ryan Trey
- Rydah J. Klyde
- Rye Rye
- Ryland Rose
- Rylo Rodriguez
- Rytmus
- Ryujin
- RZA

== S ==
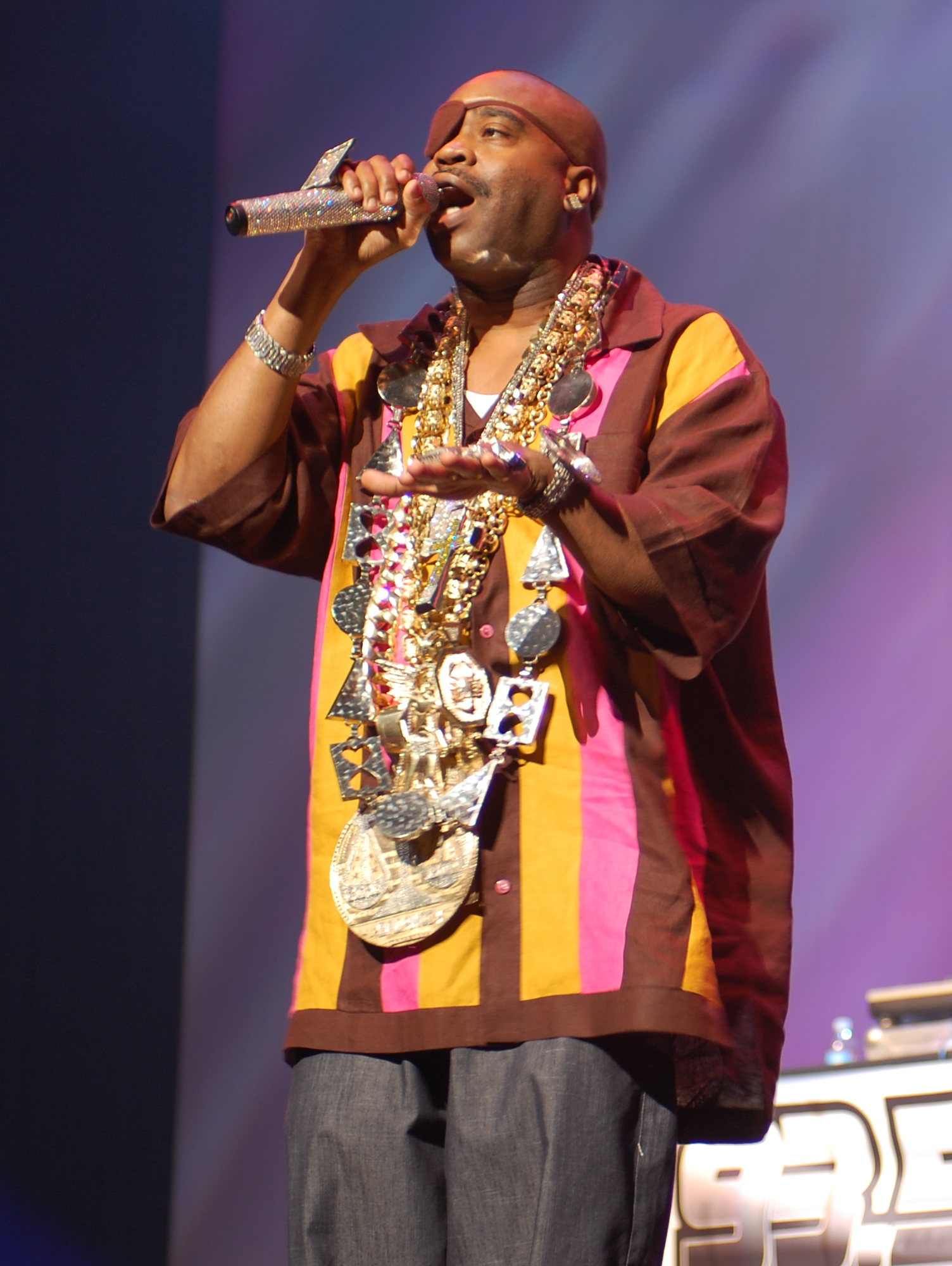
Slick Rick

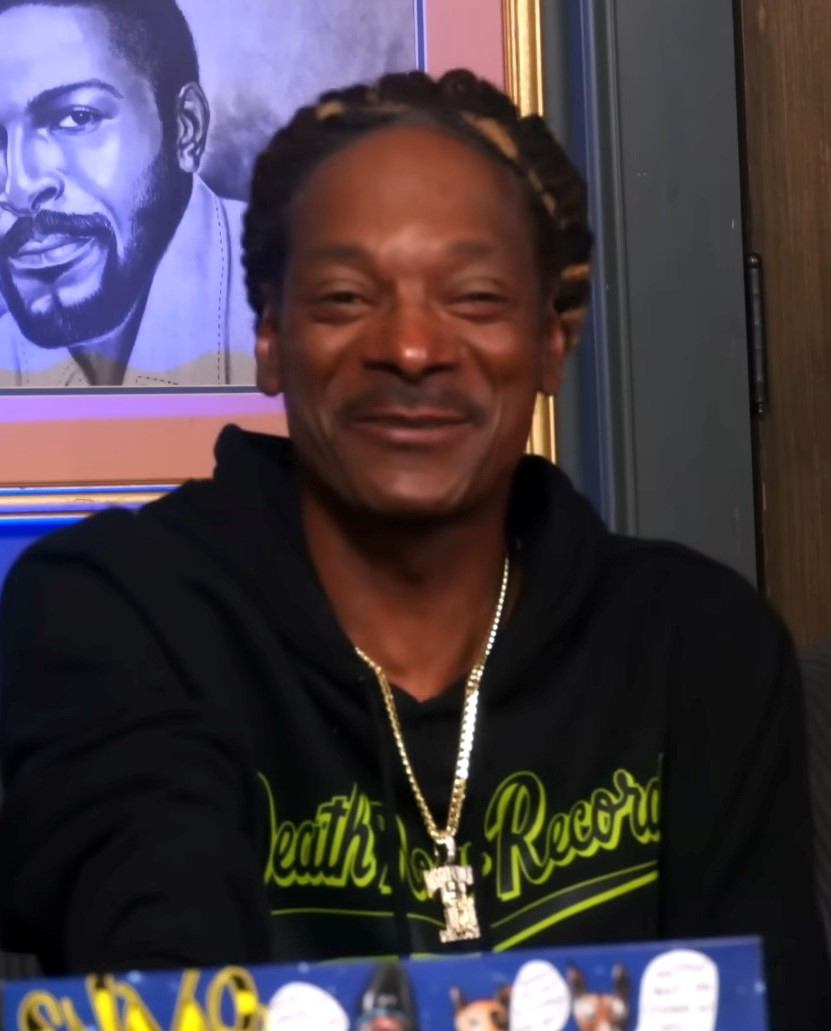
Snoop Dogg

- S-X
- S.Pri Noir
- S10
- S1mba
- S2Kizzy
- Sa-Roc
- Saafir
- Sab the Artist
- Saba
- Sabac Red
- Sabotage
- Sacario
- Sacramento Knoxx
- Sada Baby
- Sadat X
- Sadek
- Sadistik
- Safaree Samuels
- Safe
- Saffiyah Khan
- Saga
- Sage Elsesser
- Sage Francis
- Sage the Gemini
- Sage Todz
- Sagopa Kajmer
- Sagol 59
- SahBabii
- Saian
- Saigon
- Saint Dog
- Saint Jhn
- Salaam Remi
- Salif
- Salmo
- Salomon Faye
- Salt
- Sam Lin
- Sam Sneed
- Sam the Kid
- Sam Turpin
- Samara Cyn
- Sameh Zakout
- Samian
- Samm Henshaw
- Sammie
- Samra
- Sammus
- Sammy Adams
- Sampa the Great
- Sampha
- Samuel
- Samuel Seo
- Samuel T. Herring
- Samy Deluxe
- San E
- San Jaimt
- San Quinn
- Sanchez
- Sandara Park
- Sangie
- Sango
- Şanışer
- Sans Pression
- Santa Fe Klan
- Santo August
- Sap
- Sapobully
- Sara Socas
- Sarahmée
- Sarkodie
- Sarz
- Sasa Klaas
- Sasha Go Hard
- Sasha P
- Sat l'Artificier
- Sauce Money
- Sauce Walka
- Saucy Santana
- Saukrates
- Saul Williams
- Sav Killz
- Savage
- Saweetie
- Sayf
- Scarface
- ScarLip
- Scarlxrd
- Scarub
- SCH
- Schafter
- Schoolboy Q
- Schoolly D
- Schwesta Ewa
- Scoop DeVille
- Scorcher
- Scorey
- Scott La Rock
- Scott Storch
- Scotty
- Scram Jones
- Scratch
- Scribe
- Scribz Riley
- Scrilla
- Scriptonite
- Scrufizzer
- SDM
- Seagram
- Sean Combs
- Sean Forbes
- Sean Kingston
- Sean Leon
- Seán Óg
- Sean Paul
- Sean Price
- Sean Slaughter
- Sean T
- Sebastian Stakset
- Section 8
- Sefo
- Sefyu
- Şehinşah
- Sehun
- Self Jupiter
- Sematary
- Sen Dog
- Sensational
- Sensato del Patio
- Serengeti
- Serious Klein
- Serius Jones
- Server Uraz
- Seryoga
- Seth Gueko
- Sethu
- Seungwoo
- Sev Statik
- Sevn Alias
- Sexyy Red
- Sez on the Beat
- Sfera Ebbasta
- Sha EK
- Sha Money XL
- Shabaam Sahdeeq
- Shabazz the Disciple
- Shaboozey
- Shad
- Shade
- Shade Sheist
- Shadia Mansour
- Shady Blaze
- Shady Nate
- Shaggy
- Shaggy 2 Dope
- Shaheen Ariefdien
- Shahine El-Hamus
- Shaka Loveless
- Shallipopi
- Shameik Moore
- Shane Eagle
- Shanti Dope
- Shaquille O'Neal
- Shareefa
- ShaSimone
- Shavo Odadjian
- Shawnna
- Shawty Lo
- Shawty Redd
- Shay
- Shay Haley
- Shaybo
- shebeshxt
- Sheck Wes
- Sheek Louch
- Sheff G
- Shehyee
- Shelley FKA DRAM
- Shifty Shellshock
- Shigga Shay
- Shinda Kahlon
- Shindy
- Shing02
- Shirin David
- Shiva
- Shapur
- Shlohmo
- Sho Baraka
- Sho Madjozi
- Shock G
- Shorty (American)
- Shorty (Croatian)
- Shorty da Prince
- Shorty Mack
- SHOT
- Show Banga
- Shrekeezy
- Shubh
- Shunda K
- Shurik'n
- Shwayze
- Shy Glizzy
- Shygirl
- Shyheim
- Shyne
- Si Phili
- Sid Diamond
- Side Baby
- Sidhu Moose Wala
- Sido
- Sik-K
- Silentó
- Silkk the Shocker
- Silla
- Silvana Imam
- Simba La Rue
- Simon D
- Simon Rex
- Sims
- Sin Boy
- Since
- Sinik
- Sintax the Terrific
- SippinPurpp
- Sir Jinx
- Sir Michael Rocks
- Sir Mix-a-Lot
- Sirah
- Sisqó
- Sissy Nobby
- Sivion
- Sjava
- Skaiwater
- Skales
- Skalpovich
- Skee-Lo
- Skeme
- Skepta
- Ski Aggu
- Ski Beatz
- Ski Mask the Slump God
- Skiifall
- Skilla Baby
- Skillibeng
- Skillz
- Skinnyfromthe9
- Skinnyman
- Skip Marley
- Skizzy Mars
- Skooly
- Skrapz
- Skread
- Skrilla
- Skrillex
- Skull
- Skull Duggery
- Skusta Clee
- Sky Blu
- Skyzoo
- SL
- SL Jones
- Slaine
- Slame
- Slava KPSS
- Slava Marlow
- Slayr
- SleazyWorld Go
- Sleep of Oldominion
- Sleepy
- Sleepy Brown
- Sleepy Hallow
- Slick Naim
- Slick Rick
- Slim Jxmmi
- Slim Thug
- Slimka
- Slimkid3
- Slow J
- Slowthai
- Slug
- Slug Christ
- Slump6s
- Slut Boy Billy
- Small X
- Smiley
- Smino
- Smitty
- Smoke Dawg
- Smoke DZA
- Smokepurpp
- Smolasty
- Smooth
- Smoothe da Hustler
- Snak the Ripper
- Snazzy the Optimist
- Sneakbo
- SneakGuapo
- Sneazzy
- Snelle
- Snipe Young
- Snoop Dogg
- Snootie Wild
- Snot
- Snow
- Snow Tha Product
- Sobel
- Soce, the elemental wizard
- Soda Luv
- SoFaygo
- Sofia Ashraf
- Sofiane
- Sokodomo
- Sokół
- Sol Patches
- Solange Knowles
- Sole
- Solo
- Solzilla
- Sonaro
- Sonita Alizadeh
- Sonny Digital
- Sonny Seeza
- SonReal
- Sonsee
- Soojin
- Soolking
- Soopafly
- Soosan Firooz
- Soprano
- Soso Maness
- Sosocamo
- Sounwave
- Sound Sultan
- Soul Khan
- Souleye
- SoulStice
- Soulja Boy
- Soulja Slim
- Soup
- South Park Mexican
- Southside
- Soya
- Soyeon
- SpaceGhostPurrp
- Spank Rock
- Speaker Knockerz
- Special Ed
- Special K
- Speech
- Speedfreaks
- Spek Won
- Spenzo
- Spice 1
- Spider Loc
- Spinabenz
- Spliff Star
- Spoonie Gee
- Sporting Life
- Spose
- Spot
- SpotemGottem
- Sprite
- SR
- SSGKobe
- ST1M
- Stagga Lee
- Stalley
- Staqk G
- Star Bandz
- Starang Wondah
- Starlito
- Stat Quo
- Static Major
- Statik Selektah
- StaySolidRocky
- Steady B
- Steel Banglez
- Steele
- Stefflon Don
- Stelios Phili
- Stella Jang
- Stella Mwangi
- Stephen Glover
- Stephen Marley
- Steve Lacy
- Stevie Joe
- Stevie Stone
- Stevo Simple Boy
- Stezo
- stic.man
- Sticky Fingaz
- Still Fresh
- Stitches
- Stogie T
- Stoka
- Stomy Bugsy
- Stone Mecca
- Stony Blyden
- Stor
- Stormzy
- Stoupe the Enemy of Mankind
- Street Life
- Stress
- Stretch
- Strick
- Stro
- Stromae
- Strongman
- Struggle Jennings
- Stunna 4 Vegas
- Stunna Gambino
- Styles P
- Su
- Subaru Kimura
- Subliminal
- Suboi
- Substantial
- Subtitle
- SubVerso
- Sueco
- Suffa
- Suffix
- Suga
- Suga Free
- Sugarhill Ddot
- Suge Knight
- Suicideboys
- Sukhe
- Sukihana
- Sultan
- Summer Cem
- Summer Walker
- Summrs
- Sunspot Jonz
- Super Cat
- Supernatural
- Superstar Pride
- Sure Shot
- Sur Fresh
- Sus (rapper)
- Suté Iwar
- Sutter Kain
- Swae Lee
- Swagg Man
- Swarmz
- Sway
- Sweet Tee
- Swifty McVay
- Swings
- Swizz Beatz
- SwizZz
- Syd Tha Kyd
- Sylk-E. Fyne
- Sydanie
- Syster Sol
- SZA

== T ==
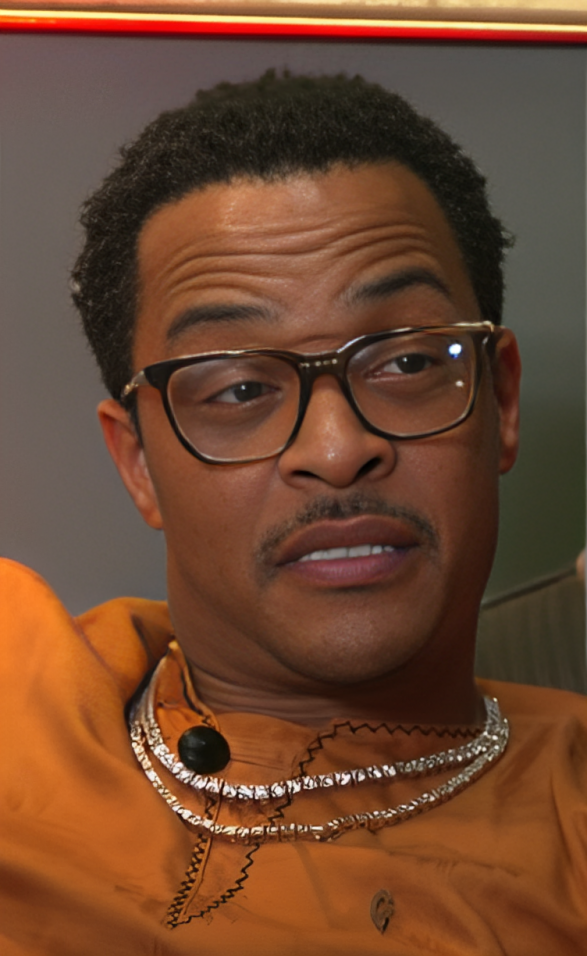
T.I.

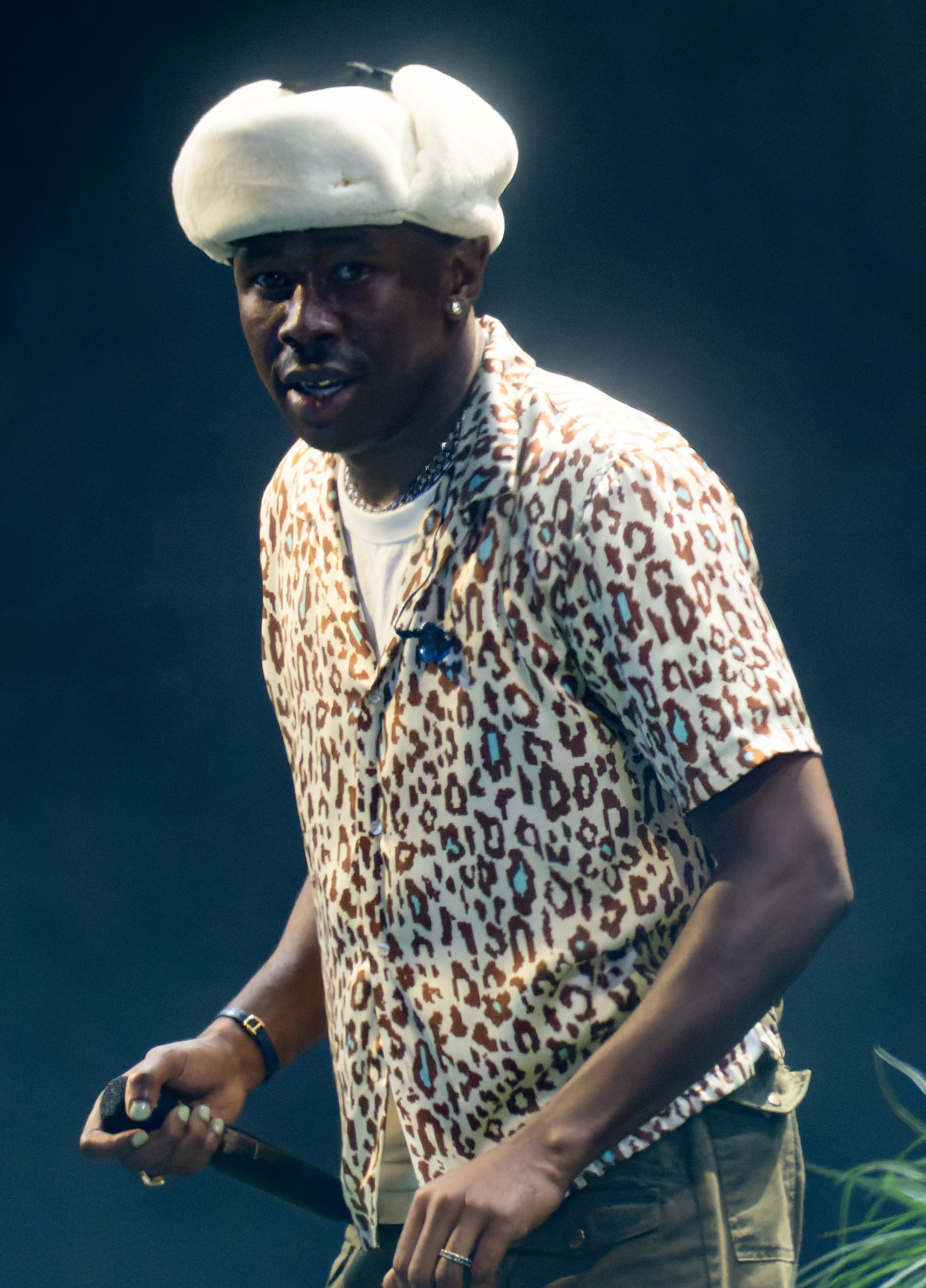
Tyler, the Creator

- T3
- T La Rock
- T-Bone
- T-Boz
- T-Killah
- T-Mo
- T-Nutty
- T-Pain
- T-Rich
- T-Wayne
- T. Mills
- T.I.
- T.O.P
- Ta-ku
- Tássia Reis
- Tabi Bonney
- Tablo
- Taboo
- Taco Hemingway
- Taebin
- Taelor Gray
- Taeyeon
- Taeyong
- Tagne
- Tainy
- Taio Cruz
- Tairrie B
- Tajai
- Takeoff
- Taktloss
- Taku Takahashi
- Talha Anjum
- Talhah Yunus
- Talib Kweli
- Tame One
- Tamer Nafar
- tana
- Tanaka
- Tank
- Tankurt Manas
- Tanna Leone
- Tang Sauce
- Target
- Tash
- Tasha the Amazon
- Tasman Keith
- Tataee
- Tate Kobang
- Tati Quebra Barraco
- Taxi B
- TAY
- Tay Dizm
- Tay Keith
- Tay Money
- Tay-K
- Tayc
- Tayce
- Taylor Bennett
- Tayna
- Tay Walker
- TD Cruze
- Teairra Marí
- Tech N9ne
- Tedashii
- Teddy Park
- Teddy Riley
- Teddy Walton
- Tedua
- TeeFlii
- Tee Grizzley
- Teejayx6
- Teephlow
- Teesy
- Teezee
- Teezo Touchdown
- Tef Poe
- Tego Calderón
- Tek
- Teki Latex
- Tekitha
- Tekno
- Tela
- Tempo
- Tempoe
- Ten
- Termanology
- Terrace Martin
- Terrell Hines
- Terry G
- Tesher
- Teyana Taylor
- Tha Chill
- Tha City Paper
- Tha Feelstyle
- Tha Realest
- Tha Trademarc
- Thaiboy Digital
- Thara Prashad
- Thasup
- That Girl Lay Lay
- That Mexican OT
- Thato Saul
- Thavius Beck
- The 45 King
- The 6th Letter
- The D.O.C.
- The Dirtball
- The-Dream
- The Kid Laroi
- The Legendary Traxster
- The Shadow
- The Weeknd
- Thee Phantom
- Thelonious Martin
- Theophilus London
- Theo Martins
- Thes One
- Thi'sl
- Third World Don
- Thomas Iannucci
- Thomas Pridgen
- Thouxanbanfauni
- Thrill Pill
- Thurz
- Thutmose
- ThxSoMch
- TiaCorine
- Tiago PZK
- Tiakola
- Tiana Major9
- Tierra Whack
- Tiffany Foxx
- Tiger JK
- Tigrão Big Tiger
- Tigris
- Tiitof
- Tim Dog
- Tim Fite
- Tima Belorusskih
- Timal
- Timati
- Timaya
- Timbaland
- Timbuktu (Canadian rapper)
- Timbuktu (Swedish rapper)
- Timi Dakolo
- Timothy DeLaGhetto
- Timbo King
- Tinashe
- Tinchy Stryder
- Tinie Tempah
- Tink
- Tion Wayne
- TisaKorean
- Tish Hyman
- Tizzo
- Tkay Maidza
- Tkinzy
- TM88
- Tobe Nwigwe
- Tobi
- Tobi Lou
- TobyMac
- Todd Terry
- Toddla T
- Token
- Tokischa
- Tokyo's Revenge
- Tom Green
- Tom MacDonald
- Tom Morello
- Tom Zanetti
- Tomasa del Real
- Tommy Cash
- Tommy Genesis
- Tommy Lee
- Tommy Richman
- Tommy Wright III
- Tone Lōc
- Tone Trump
- Tonedeff
- Toni Blackman
- Toni L
- Tony Boy
- Tony Effe
- Tony Shhnow
- Tony Sunshine
- Tony Tillman
- Tony Touch
- Tony Yayo
- Too Poetic
- Too Short
- Toomaj Salehi
- Toosii
- Topaz Jones
- Tope Adenibuyan
- TopGunn
- Top Dog
- Topher
- Toquel
- Torae
- Torch (American)
- Torch (German)
- Tormento
- Toro y Moi
- Tory Lanez
- Toya Delazy
- Towkio
- Tracey Lee
- Trademark Da Skydiver
- Trae tha Truth
- Tragedy Khadafi
- Trap Beckham
- Trap Dickey
- Trapland Pat
- Trapp Mendoza
- Travie McCoy
- Travis Barker
- Travis Bennett
- Travis Miller
- Travis Mills
- Travis Scott
- Traxamillion
- Tray Deee
- Tray Little
- Tre Capital
- Tre Mission
- Treach
- Trettmann
- Trevor Jackson
- Trey Songz
- Trick Daddy
- Trick-Trick
- Tricky
- Trife Diesel
- Trillville
- Trim (American rapper)
- Trim (musician)
- Trina
- Trinidad James
- Trip Lee
- Trippie Redd
- Tristan Wilds
- Troo.L.S
- Trouble
- Trouble T Roy
- Troy Ave
- True Master
- Trueno
- Trugoy
- Tshego
- Tsumyoki
- Tubby T
- Tuks Senganga
- Tumi Molekane
- Tunisiano
- Tupac Shakur
- Turbo
- Turbo B
- Turf Talk
- Turk
- Tweedy Bird Loc
- Tweezy
- Twista
- Twisted Insane
- Two-9
- TwoTiime
- Ty Dolla Sign
- Ty Fyffe
- Tyga
- Tyrese Gibson
- Tyla Yaweh
- Tyler James Williams
- Tyler Joseph
- Tyler, The Creator
- Tyra Bolling
- Tyson Yoshi

== U ==
- U-God
- Uffie
- Ufo361
- Ugly God
- Uncle Kracker
- Uncle Murda
- Uncle Reece
- Unk
- Unknown P
- Unknown T
- UnoTheActivist
- Upchurch
- Urthboy
- Usher
- Usimamane
- U$O
- Uzi (French rapper)
- Uzi (Turkish rapper)
- Uzi (Japanese rapper)

== V ==
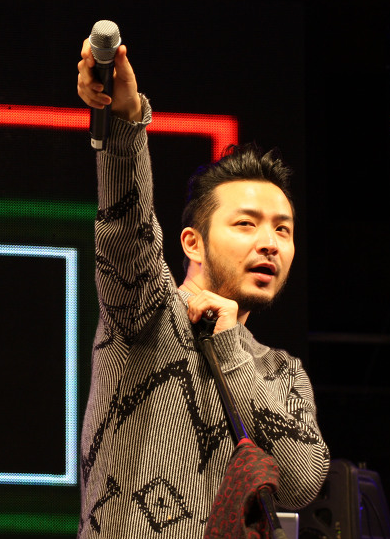
Verbal Jint

- V $ X V PRiNCE
- V-Nasty
- V.I.C.
- Vacca
- Vacío
- Vada Azeem
- Vado
- Vakill
- Val Young
- Vald
- Valee
- Valete
- Valtònyc
- Vanessa Mdee
- Vanilla Ice
- Vast Aire
- Vava
- Vayda
- VC Barre
- Vector
- Veeze
- Vegedream
- Velous
- Verb T
- Verbal
- Verbal Jint
- Verse Simmonds
- Vic Mensa
- Vico C
- Victony
- Victor AD
- Victor Ma
- Viddal Riley
- Viini
- VillaBanks
- Villano Antillano
- Vince Staples
- Vinnie Paz
- Vinxen
- Vinylz
- Vinz
- Violent J
- Viper
- Visto
- Vita
- VL Mike
- Volume 10
- Vordul Mega
- Vory
- Voyage
- VTEN

== W ==
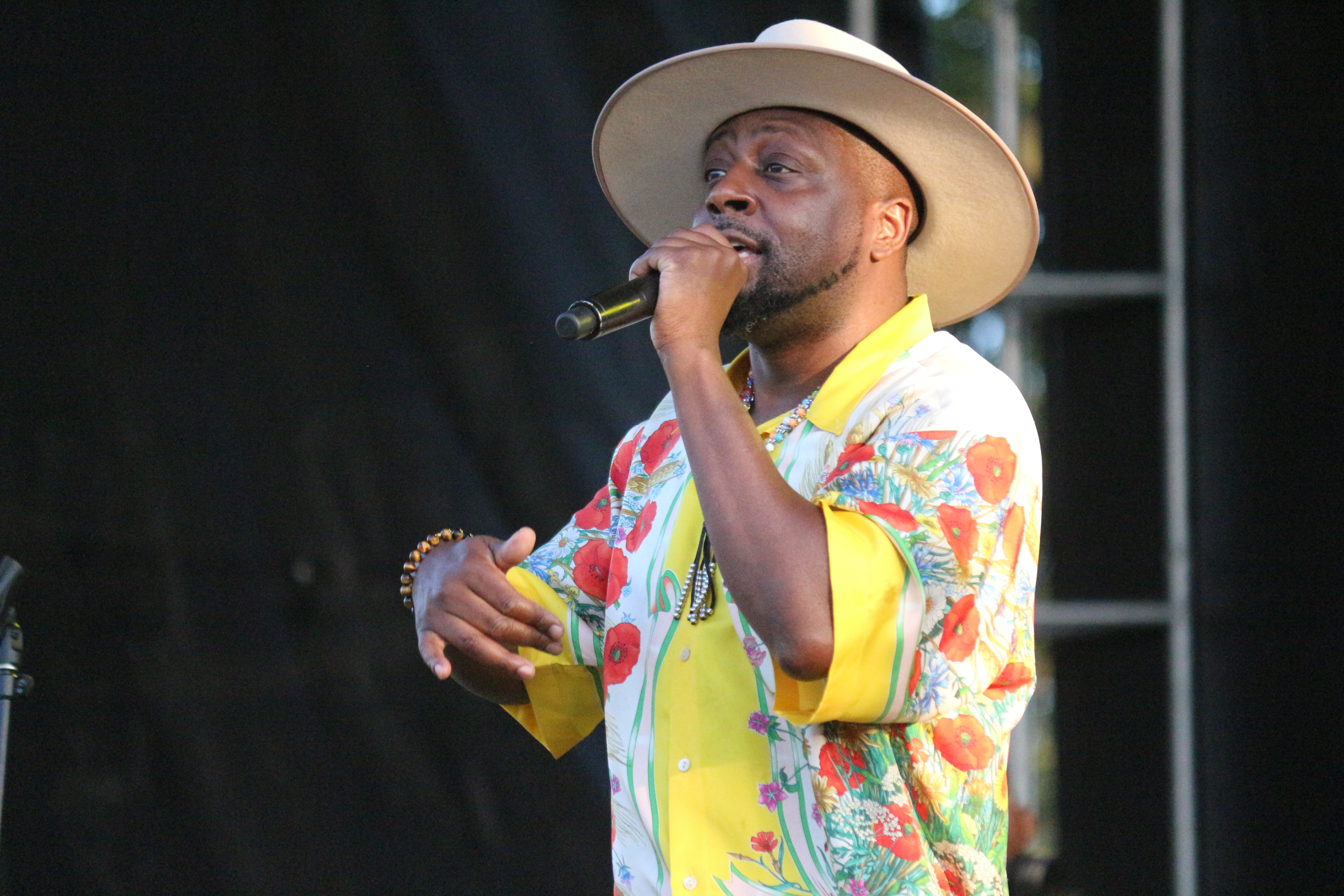
Wyclef Jean

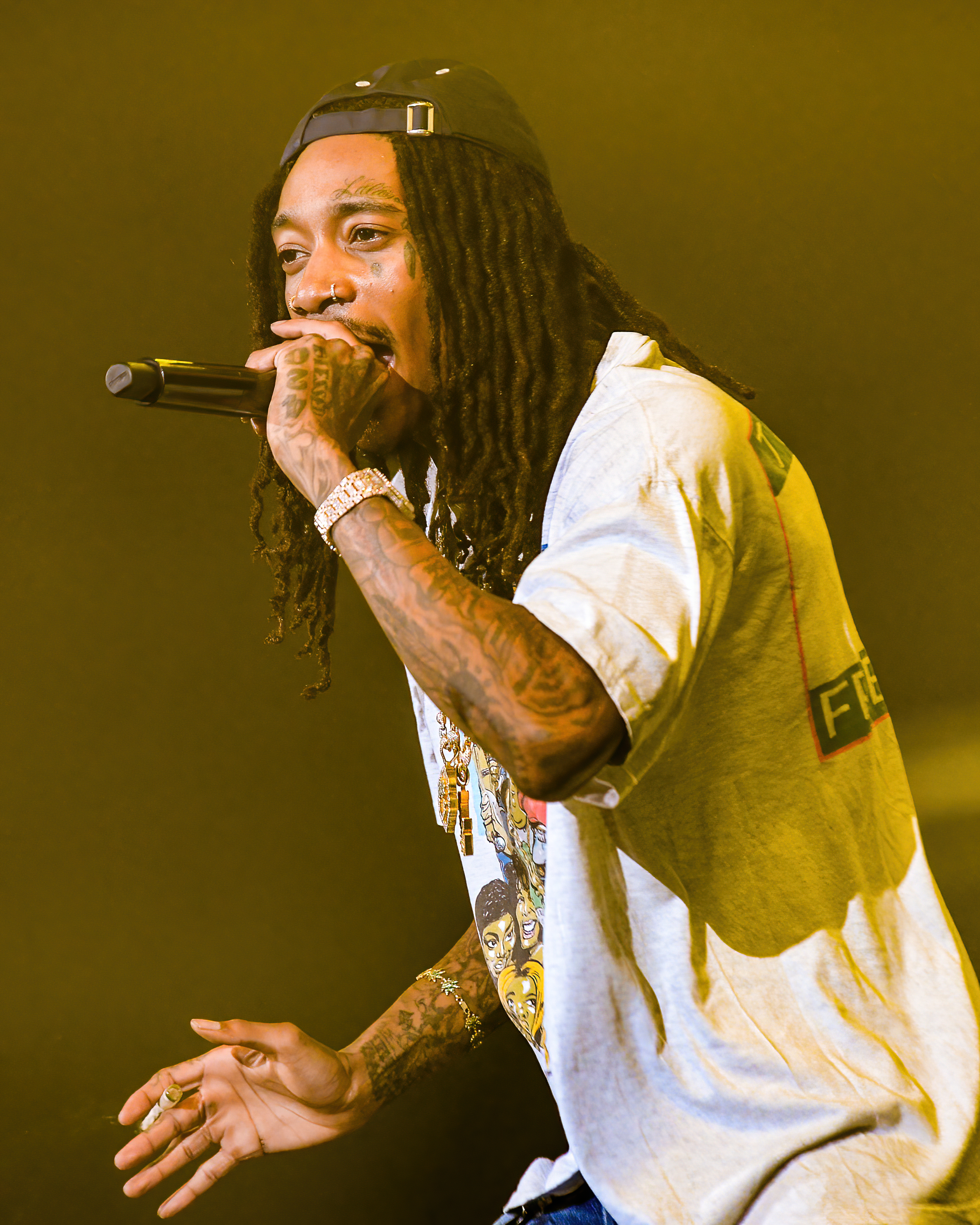
Wiz Khalifa

- Waajeed
- Waka Flocka Flame
- Wale
- Wali Shah
- Walkie
- Wallen
- Wande Coal
- Wangechi
- Warhol.SS
- Warren G
- Warren Hue
- Warryn Campbell
- Watsky
- Wawa
- Wawesh
- Wax
- Wayne Santana
- WC
- Webbie
- Wegz
- Weiland
- Weird MC
- Wem
- Wendy Ho
- Wes Nelson
- Westside Boogie
- Westside Gravy
- Westside Gunn
- Wheezy
- Whethan
- Whitearmor
- White Dawg
- Wicca Phase Springs Eternal
- Wifisfuneral
- Wifiskeleton
- Wiki
- Wikluh Sky
- Wildchild
- Wiley
- Will Pan
- Will Smith
- will.i.am
- Wille Crafoord
- Willie D
- Willie Peyote
- Willie the Kid
- Willis Earl Beal
- Willow Smith
- Willy Northpole
- Wise Bissue
- Wise (American)
- Wise (Japanese)
- Wise Intelligent
- Wish Bone
- Wisin
- Witchdoctor
- Wiz Khalifa
- Wizkid
- WizTheMc
- Wolfacejoeyy
- Wombat
- Won-G
- WondaGurl
- Wonder Mike
- Wonstein
- Woo Won Jae
- Woojin
- Wooseok
- Wordburglar
- Wordsayer
- Wordsmith
- Wordsplayed
- Wordsworth
- Wos
- Wrekonize
- Wretch 32
- Wuno
- Wyclef Jean
- Wyldfyer
- Wynne

== X ==
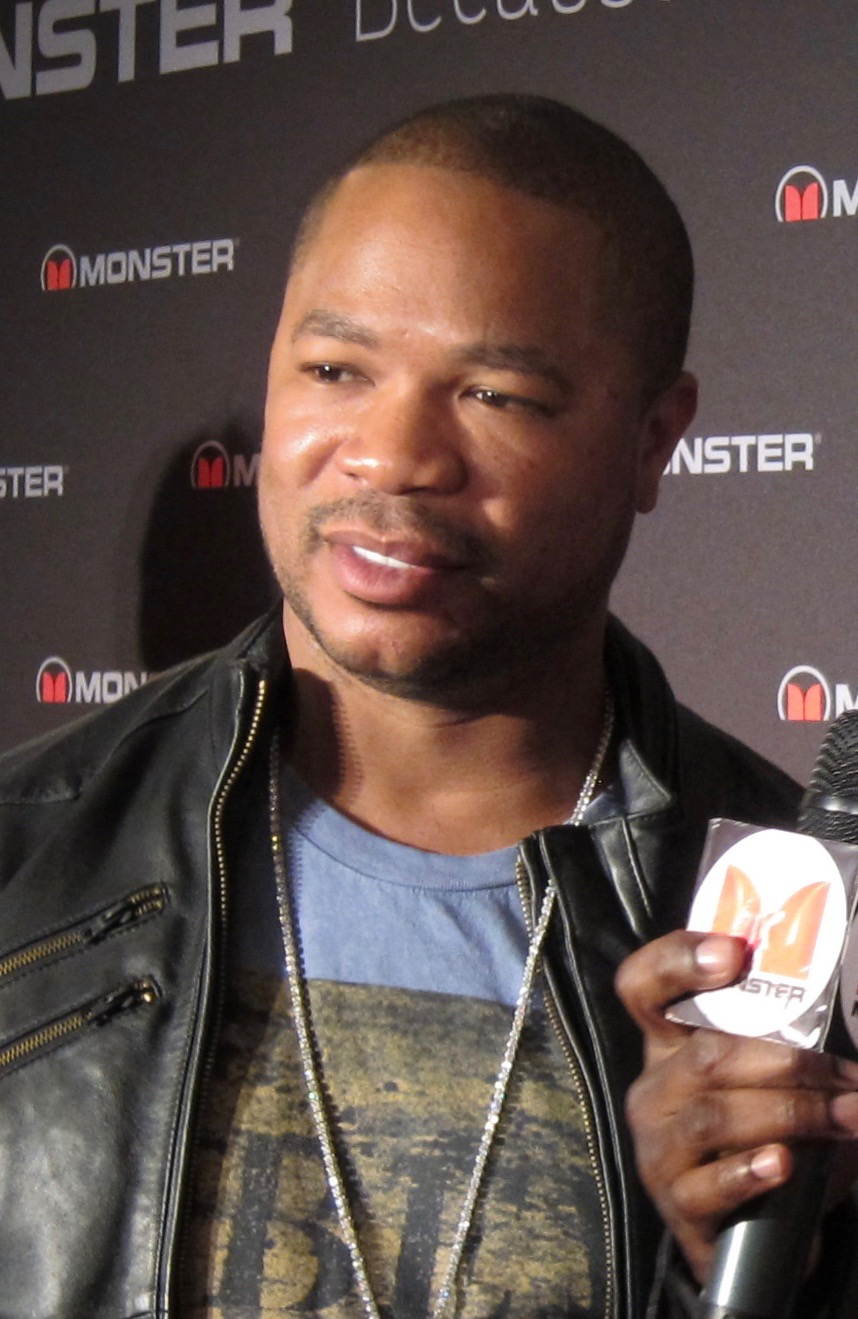
Xzibit

- X-Alfonso
- X1
- X-Raided
- Xamã
- Xander
- XanMan
- X A T A R
- Xaven The Kopala Queen
- Xaviersobased
- Xavier Wulf
- Xeno Carr
- Xie Keyin
- Xiuhtezcatl Martinez
- Xperience
- Xpert
- XV
- XXXTentacion
- Xzibit

== Y ==
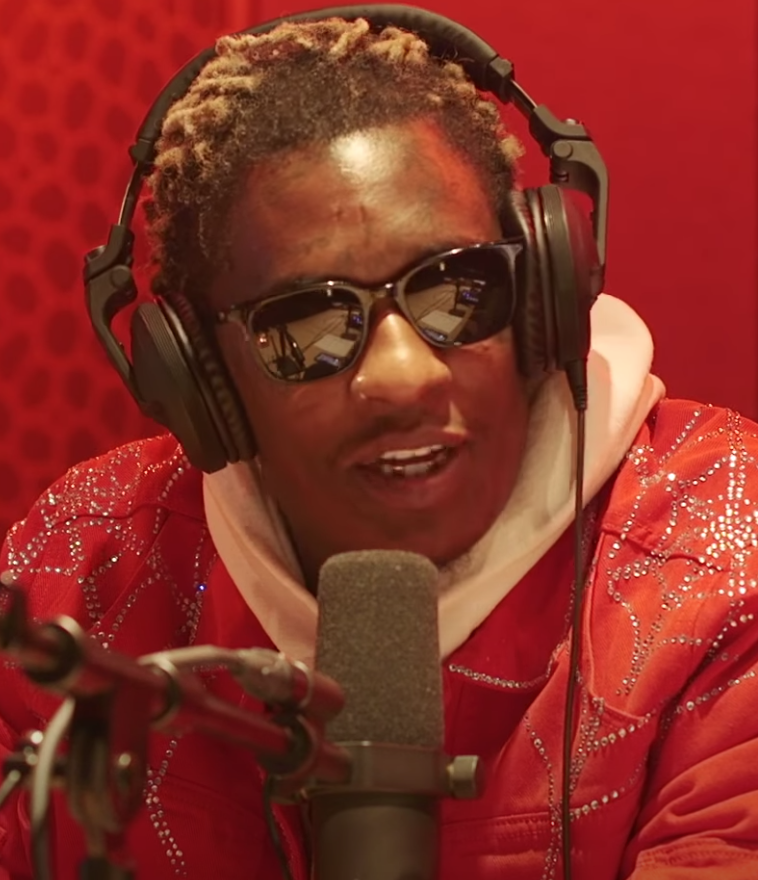
Young Thug

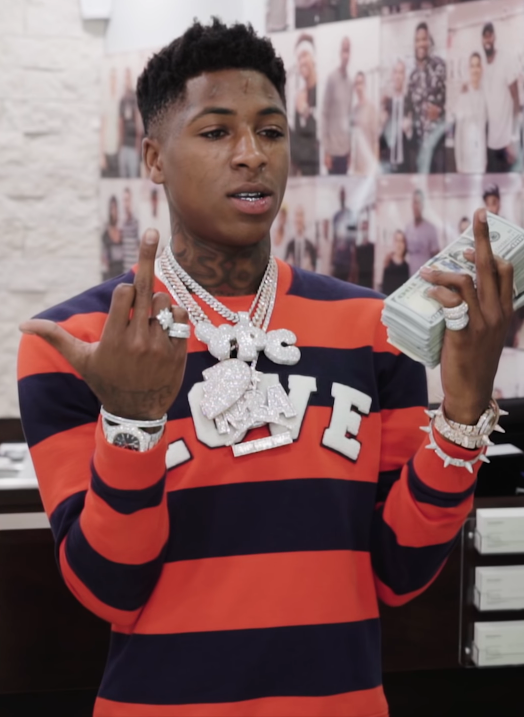
YoungBoy Never Broke Again

- Y-Love
- Y2K
- Ya Boy
- Yailin La Más Viral
- Yak Ballz
- Ya Kid K
- Yaki Kadafi
- Yama Buddha
- Yameen
- Yamy
- Yanchan
- Yandel
- Yan Yan Chan
- Yang Dong-geun
- Yanix
- Yannick
- Yarmak
- Yas
- Yasiin Bey (Mos Def)
- Yasin
- Yaw Tog
- Yazz The Greatest
- YBN Nahmir
- YC
- Ycee
- Yeat
- Jang Ye-eun
- Yelawolf
- Yella Beezy
- YFN Lucci
- YG
- YGD Tha Top Dogg
- YGTUT
- Yhapojj
- YKNiece
- YK Osiris
- YL
- YN Jay
- Yng Lvcas
- YNW BSlime
- YNW Melly
- Yo Gotti
- Yo-Yo
- Yo Yo Honey Singh
- Yohani
- Yolandi Visser
- Yongguk
- YONII
- Yoni Wolf
- Yoon Mi-rae
- Yotuel
- Young B
- Young Bleed
- Young Buck
- Young Chop
- Young Chris
- Young Dolph
- Young Dro
- Young Greatness
- Young Igi
- Young Jonn
- Young K
- Young Leosia
- Young M.A
- Young Maylay
- Young MC
- Young Miko
- Young Music DYMG
- Young Noble
- Young Nudy
- Young Roddy
- Young Scooter
- Young Scrap
- Young Slo-Be
- Young Thug
- Young Zee
- YoungBoy Never Broke Again
- Younglord
- Youngn Lipz
- Youngohm
- YoungstaCPT
- Your Old Droog
- Youssoupha
- YTB Fatt
- YTCracker
- Yubin
- Yuk Ji-dam
- Yukmouth
- Yumdda
- Yung Bans
- Yung Beef
- Yung Berg
- Yung Bleu
- Yung Carter
- Yung Filly
- Yung Gravy
- Yung Hurn
- Yung Joc
- Yung Kayo
- Yung L
- Yung L.A.
- Yung Lean
- Yung Mal
- Yung Miami
- Yung Raja
- Yung Ro
- Yung Simmie
- Yung Swiss
- Yung Tory
- Yung Tyran
- Yung Wun
- Yung6ix
- Yungblud
- Yungeen Ace
- Yungen
- YungManny
- Yuno Miles
- Yuri Ichii
- Yury Khovansky
- Yuto Adachi
- Yuya Matsushita
- Yvie Oddly
- yvngxchris
- Yxng Bane
- Yxngxr1
- YZ
- Yzalú

== Z ==
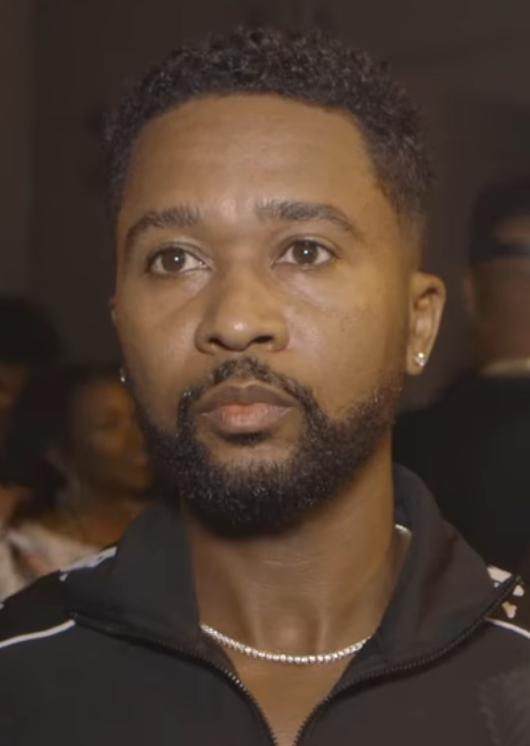
Zaytoven

- Z LaLa
- Z-Man
- Z.B.U.K.U
- Z. Mann Zilla
- Z-Ro
- Żabson
- Zacari
- Zach Hill
- Zachg
- Zack de la Rocha
- Zack Fox
- Zack Knight
- Zane One
- Zayar Thaw
- Zayn Africa
- Zaytoven
- Zdechły Osa
- Zebra Katz
- Zeebra
- ZeeTheWizard
- Zelo
- Zelooperz
- Zen-G
- Zera
- Zero 9:36
- Zeus
- Zeze Kingston
- Zhou Zhennan
- Ziak
- ZieZie
- Zico
- Zifou
- Ziggy
- Ziggy Ramo
- Zilla
- ZillaKami
- Zinoleesky
- Zion.T
- Zizo
- ZK
- Zlatan Ibile
- Zola
- Zombie-Chang
- Zombie Juice
- Zoocci Coke Dope
- Zoro
- Zoxea
- Zuby
- Zuna

== See also ==
- List of hip-hop groups
- Lists of musicians
- List of murdered hip-hop musicians
