= Kohndo =

French rapper

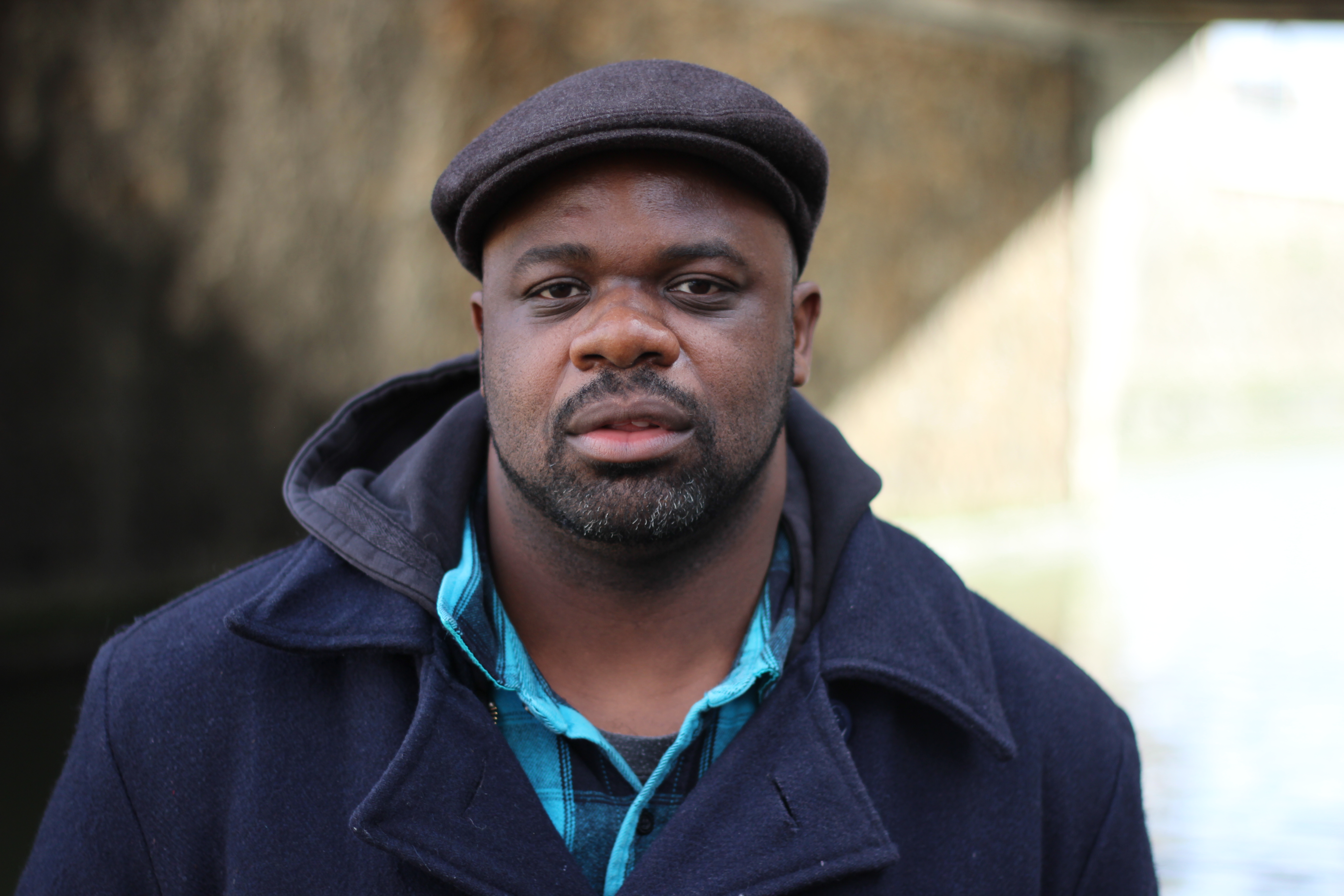
- Kohndo in 2014

Background information
- Born: Kohndo Assogba; 17 June 1975 (age 50)
- Origin: France
- Genres: French hip hop, hip hop
- Website: Official website

Kohndo (also known as Doc Odnok, full name Kohndo Assogba) is a French rapper and producer born on 17 June 1975 in Saint-Cloud, a suburb of Paris. Kohndo is known as one of the best lyricist in french rap. He gained recognition as a rapper during the 1990s as a part of the influential rap group, La Cliqua.

== Biography ==
=== Early career ===
After his birth in France, Kohndo moved to Benin (West Africa) where his family originated. A few years later he moved back to France, and grew up in Bobigny, a suburb located north-east of Paris. In 1984, he discovered part of Hip-Hop culture through the TV Show, H.I.P. H.O.P. hosted by Sidney. In 1987, he relocated to the "Cité du Pont de Sèvre" (Pont de Sèvre Housing Projects) in Boulogne Billancourt, a wealthier suburb located west of Paris. There he befriended his downstairs neighbor whose family, like his, came from Benin, and who would be later known in the rap scene as Zoxea, a member of Les Sages Poètes de la Rue. With Zoxea, Kohndo discovered the deeper aspects of Hip-Hop, and after having learned ‘human beatboxing’ began rapping. Zoxea introduced Kohndo to his cousin: Egosyst, with whom he formed the band: "Coup d’Etat Phonique" alongside producer Lumumba and then-young rapper, Raphael. In 1994, at a radio show, Egosyst and Kohndo met Daddy Lord C, a rapper and former member of the Black Dragons, a Parisian gang. With Daddy Lord C, producer Chimiste, dj Jelahee and Rocca they would form La Cliqua.

=== The La Cliqua years ===
With the stage name Doc Odnok and as a part of La Cliqua, Kohndo toured radios and stages, and then released, in 95, a first EP, now considered a master piece of French Rap: "Conçu pour durer" (Built to Last) on Arsenal Records. Doc Odnok delivered, for the first time on record, his then eccentric rhyming style alongside his microphone associates: Daddy Lord C, Rocca, Raphael and Egosyt. The record was an immediate success in the French Hip-Hop scene. Quickly Arsenal Records signed with major label Barclay, and La Cliqua worked on their next project released in 1996 as a compilation album: "Arsenal Represente le Vrai Hip-Hop" (Arsenal represents the Real Hip-Hop). The record featured all members of La Cliqua and their young affiliates: Petit Boss and Cercle Vicieux. Critically acclaimed, La Cliqua became a major feature on the French Hip-Hop landscape. They opened for Arrested Development at the Olympia in Paris and performed in New York City at the Zulu Nation Anniversary. Following in the footsteps of "Represente le Vrai Hip-Hop", Rocca was the first emcee from La Cliqua to release a solo album: "Entre Deux Monde" which featured Kohndo on: "Mot pour mot" and "Rap Contact 2". In 1997, Egosyst, Kohndo's rhyme partner on "Coup d’Etat Phonique" decided to leave La Cliqua. Kohndo would remain with the band until 1998, when he left the crew to develop his solo projects and career.

=== After La Cliqua ===
Shifting lyrical styles for a more relaxed and mature approach, in 1998, Kohndo was invited on NAP's album "La fin du Monde", on Koma's "Le Reveil" and to participate in the compilations: "ZonZon" (Soundtrack) and "Paris, New York, Marseille" (along with Jay-Z and IAM). In 1999, Kohndo released a first EP: "Prélude à l’Odysée", establishing himself as a solo artist. The following year he released another EP: "Jungle Boogie", and then a third one in 2001: "J’entends les Sirènes". On those solo projects, Kohndo exposed his vision of a Hip-Hop far from the clichés of violence and fake gangsterism. 2003 saw the release of his long-awaited album, the critically acclaimed: "Tout est écrit", presented as a recollection of "urban poetry" with welcome hints of soul and jazz. In 2004, Kohndo released "Blind Test", a compilation of older tracks and previously unreleased materials. Over the years Kohndo has open stages for Masta Ace, Edo G (at Nouveau Casino), Talib Kweli, Mobb Deep (La Scène Bastille) and Isaac Hayes (Olympia).

=== "Stick to Ground" ===
Kohndo released his second solo album in 2006: "Deux Pieds sur Terre / Stick to ground", a new masterpiece partly mixed in Detroit, featuring the Motor City's very own: Slum Village and Dwele. Other American artists contributed to this album such as Jaheim and Insight with who Kohndo delivers one of the best combination of French and English lyrics ever recorded. The album was released with a DVD which featured three new videos, including "Dis-moi" with Slum Village and "Stick to Ground" with Insight, both shot in Paris. Kohndo produced 4 tracks on the album. Other producers on the album include 20Syl of Hocus Pocus, dj Brasco as well as Jee 2 Tuluz and Stix who were already featured on "Tout est écrit". It must be pointed out that "Deux Pieds sur Terre / Stick to Ground" offers an international angle of Hip-Hop, not only because of the featured American artists but also because it has been released in Europe, Japan, Australia and in the USA.

=== Kohndo & Velvet Club ===
It was following the release of "Deux Pieds sur Terre / Stick to Ground", and after various collaborations with musicians that Kohndo decided to form a live band to share the stage with him. In a few months of meetings and auditions, Kohndo had created the "Velvet Club" - composed of: Sebastien Artigue (Bass), Yann Massoubre (Drum), David Santhino (Keys), Thomas Agrinier (Guitar) and Dj Kozi (Turntables). Kohndo & Velvet Club have performed all over France, noticibale performances have been at the festivals "La Rue au Grand Palais", "Nancy Jazz Pulsation" and the "Printemps de Bourges".

=== La Cliqua Reunion ===
In April 2008, Kohndo and the other members of La Cliqua (minus Raphael) came back together for a performance at the Festival l'Original in Lyon. This successful, unexpected, reunion which resurrected on stage some of La Cliqua's classic repertoire, was followed in January 2009 by a sold-out concert in Paris, at the Elysée Montmartre.

=== Soul Inside ===
After touring with his live band for years, Kohndo worked on his third album "Soul Inside", influenced by live instrumentation, the album was released in May 2011 in Europe and a year later in the United States with two additional tracks inviting Rasco, Amad-Jamal, Flip and Rascue (Rasta Cue Tip of Various Blends). The first video for the single Soul Inside was released in December 2010. Other videos extracted from Soul Inside include "Rock On" featuring Song and Karl The Voice, "Mon Ghetto", "My Tribute (Mon Ghetto remixed by Flip)", "Mes Nuits" featuring Marie M, and "Vise le Ciel Remix" featuring Brother Amir.

=== Career developments and engagements ===
A rapper, beatmaker and executive producer, Kohndo is also working as a sound engineer on various projects, such as on the album of dj Brasco "Fill the Gap" which features American rappers: Frank n Dank, Phat Kat, Black Milk, Wildchild, Rasco, Declaime, etc. He has collaborated on various projects and shows with french Hip-Hop pioneer Dj Deenasty.

== Discography ==
=== With Coup d'Etat Phonique and La Cliqua ===
- Conçu pour durer (EP - Arsenal Records) (1995)
- Dans ma tête II (12 inch - Arsenal Records) (1995)
- Arsenal Re-présente "Le Vrai Hip Hop" (Compilation Album - Arsenal Records) (1996)
- Mot pour Mot & Rap Contact II (on Rocca's Album "Entre deux mondes" - Arsenal Records) (1997)
- Mot pour Mot (12 inch Promo, Arsenal Records) (1997)
- Méfiance feat. Zoxea & Moda (Compilation Neg de la Peg [1994], Larchiviste Record, K.Nostra) (2019)
- Exercice de Style feat. Booba & Moda (Compilation Neg de la Peg [1994], Larchiviste Record, K.Nostra) (2019)

=== Albums as a solo artist ===
- Tout est écrit (Album - Ascetic Music) (2003)
- Blind Test (Album compilation - Jungle Boogie Records) (2004)
- Deux pieds sur terre / Stick to ground (Album - Ascetic Music, Greenstone Records) (2006)
- Soul Inside (Album, Greenstone Records) (2011)
- Soul Inside - US Edition (Album, Greenstone Records) (2012)
- Tout est écrit - Anniversary Edition (Album - Greenstone Records) (2014)
- Intra Muros (Album, Greenstone Records) (2016)
- Plus Haut Que La Tour Eiffel (Album, La Couveuse) (2023)

=== Singles, 12 inches, EP and mixtapes as a solo artist ===
- Prélude à l’odyssée (EP - Exil Records) (1999)
- Jungle Boogie (EP - Exil Records) (2000)
- J’entends les sirènes (Woop ! Woop !) (EP - Nothing but soul records) (2001)
- Dis-Moi ce qu’elles veulent feat. Slum Village b/w Stick to ground feat. Insight (12 inch - Ascetic Music, Greenstone Records) (2005)
- D’un mot à l’autre / Sur le toit du monde (12 inch - Ascetic Music, Greenstone Records) (2006)
- Classic and Rare Joints (Mixtape, Greenstone Records) (2009)
- Soul Bag (Compilation Mixtape by Dj XYZ, Greenstone Records) (2012)
- Jee Van Cleef presents The Soul Brother Blends (Compilation Blends, JVC) (2012)
- Artchives vol.1 (by Jee Van Cleef) (Compilation of unreleased materials, Greenstone Records) (2016)

=== Notable appearances ===
- On se retrouvera - East feat. Kohndo & Daddy Lord C (1997)
- Front Nubien - Kohndo, IMS, Cercle Vicieux ("Sachons dire non") (1998)
- Au Sommet de Paris - NAP ("La fin du monde") (1998)
- Zonzon (Soundtrack) (1998)
- Paris, New York, Marseille (Compilation) (1998)
- Un parmi des millions - Koma feat. Kohndo and Rocé (Le Réveil) (1998)
- Qui Sommeille en moi - Triptik (TR-303) (2003)
- Du Sable sur les Paupières - Hocus Pocus (2006)
- Regretter le Temps (Hommage à Fredy K) - Madison, Mokobe, Manu Key, Kohndo, Daddy Lord C, Ill, Zoxea (2008)
- Music Hall - Blackstamp Music (2009)
- Hip Hop Ninja Remix - Vicelow (2012)
