= James BKS =

French lyricist, a music composer

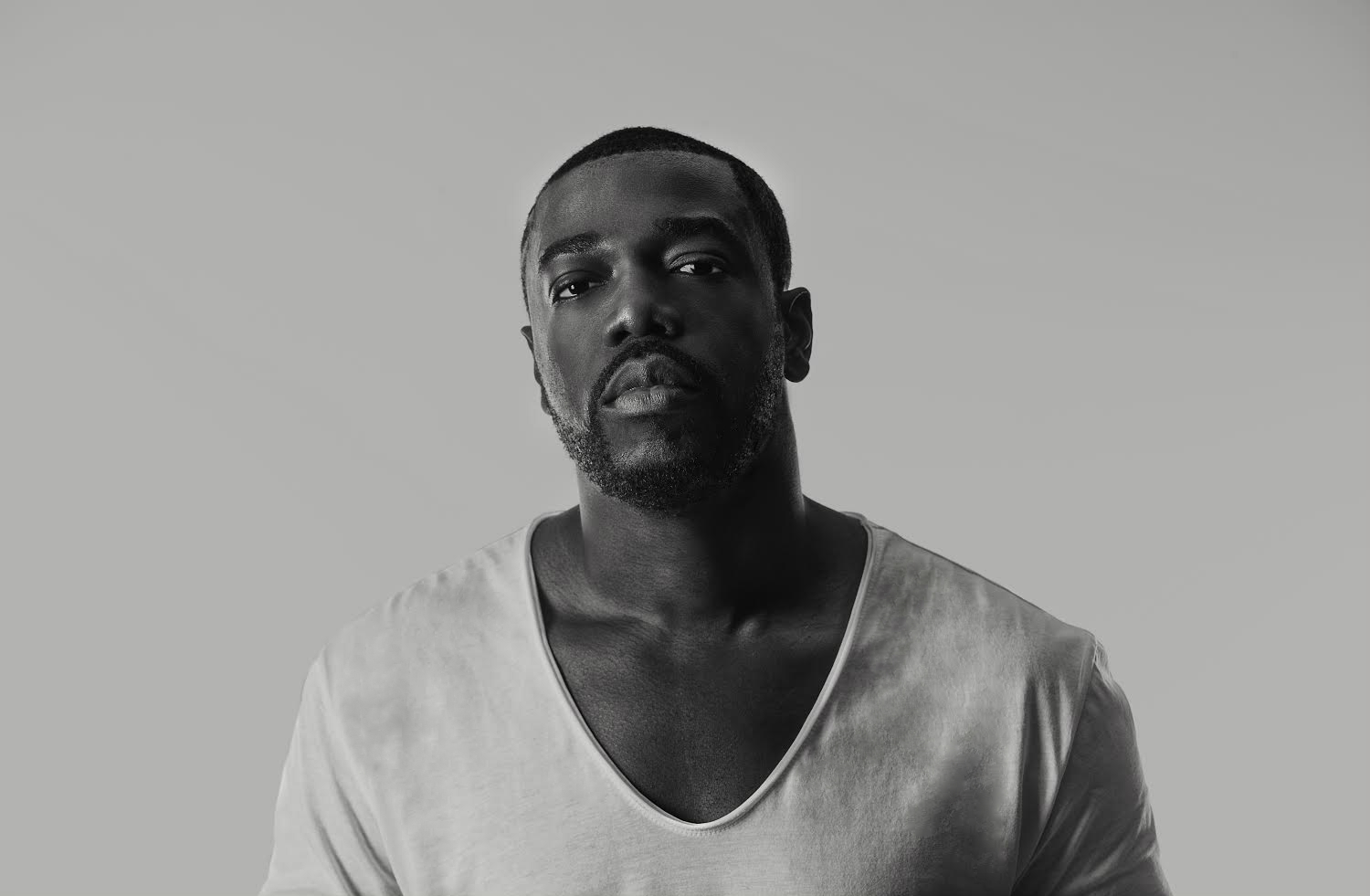
- James BKS in 2015

Background information
- Birth name: Lee-James Edjouma
- Born: 18 November 1982 (age 42); Paris, France
- Genres: African hip hop
- Instruments: Vocals; guitar; drums
- Labels: Konvict Muzik (US); Grown Kid (FR); 7Wallace (UK)

Lee-James Edjouma (born 18 November), better known by his stage name James BKS, is a French lyricist, a music composer and a producer of African hip hop.

== Career ==
=== Early career ===
Born in Paris, Edjouma's career started out in the US when he signed on Akon's label Konvict Muzik. It was around this time that he was working with famous artists such as R. City, T-Pain, and producing for Sean Combs, Snoop Dogg, Ja Rule, and Booba. He then decided to return to France to focus on his personal project.

=== Music ===
He is currently signed to Idris Elba’s London-based label, 7Wallace. He released three singles on the label, featuring Allan Kingdom, Reo Cragun, Ebenezer, Idris Elba, Q-Tip (A Tribe Called Quest), Little Simz and his father Manu Dibango. He also co-founded his own record label and music production company, Grown Kid, with his wife. His music has been aired several times on international radios most notably being playlisted on Annie Mac’s radio show on BBC 1Xtra.

James BKS is also a composer of original scores for feature films and advertisement.

=== Live ===
James BKS started performing live in late 2019 in Paris, showcasing his live performance for the first time at La Petite Halle de la Villette. He also performed for the Africa Day event on MTV Base Africa and for Arte Concert

He also performed live before the AFCON finals.

== Personal life ==
Edjouma is the son of famous Cameroonian musician Manu Dibango.

== Discography ==
=== Compositions ===
- 2008 : Petit Nègre – Al Peco
- 2008 : 100 barres – Al Peco
- 2008 : King – Booba
- 2009 : Groove On – Timati (feat. Snoop Dogg)
- 2010 : Plus Que De La Musique – Sat L’Artificier (feat. Akhenaton, Soprano)
- 2011 : I'm On You – Timati (feat. P. Diddy)
- 2012 : Party Animal – Timati
- 2012 : Pain Is Love – Ja Rule
- 2012 : To The Top – Ja Rule (feat. Kalenna)
- 2012 : Requiem – Sadek
- 2012 : Mecs du Hood – Zoxea
- 2013 : Retrofuturflow – Ol Kainry (feat. Youssoupha)
- 2013 : Pas Besoin – Kamelancien (feat. Atheena)
- 2016 : Tu sais – Christophe Willem, Black M, Inna Modja, Manu Dibango
- 2017 : Art Contemporain (album) – Les Sages Poètes de la Rue

=== Soundtracks ===
- 2014 : Une Histoire Banale directed by Audrey Estrougo
- 2015 : La Taularde, directed by Julie Gayet
- 2016 : Le Gang Des Antillais directed by Jean-Claude Barny

=== Singles ===
- 2018 : Kwele (feat. Allan Kingdom, Manu Dibango)
- 2018 : MaWakanda (feat. Reo Cragun, Ebenezer)
- 2019 : New Breed (feat. Q-Tip, Idris Elba, Little Simz)
