= Osez =

- Origin: Lausanne, Switzerland
- Years active: 1988–present
- Website: www.osez.ch

Osez was born in Montevideo, he was a member of the rap group "Sens Unik".

He performed live on many stages from Switzerland (Montreux Jazz Festival, Paleo Festival), New York (New Music Seminar) to Paris (Bataclan), Montreal, Berlin, Barcelone and all over Europe.

He started with the group in 1991 as dancer for the "6ème sens" tour then became a full-time MC.

Sens Unik's third album, "Chromatic", went gold in both Switzerland and Sweden. Osez raps on the "Chromatic" and "El Sueno" tracks. The album spawned two hits and featured a number of other European hip hop artists including MC Solaar.

Osez also appears on the track "Le vent tourne" from the gold album soundtrack of the movie La Haine from Mathieu Kassovitz.

He left the band in 1996 for a solo career and appears as guest artist on the "Barbarian" track of the fourth Sens Unik album, "Tribulations", recorded in New York by Tim Latham. He has also been featured alongside MC Carlos on the track "Hijo de Latino", which celebrates his Latin heritage. Multicultural rappers such as Osez serve as an interesting contrast to the "Mundart" or "dialect" rap of more traditionally Swiss MCs.

As solo artist he appears on many compilations and mix tapes, such as "Les Cool Sessions 2", "Menu Kebab", "Le Defi", "L'Assaut", some mix tapes by DJ Cut Killer and Logilo, and as a featured artist on many projects including: "Le Gooster", "Ne joue pas avec le feu" from Sleo (a full track with other rappers like Fabe, Rocca, Daddy Lord C, Lady Lestee), and a Deborah solo album.

In 2009, he created his own music label, "OàZMusic", on which he released his first single, and solo album called "L'oeuvre" as producer, composer and MC.
