= Boulevard Barbès =

Boulevard in Paris, France

Coordinates: 48°53′15″N 2°20′58″E

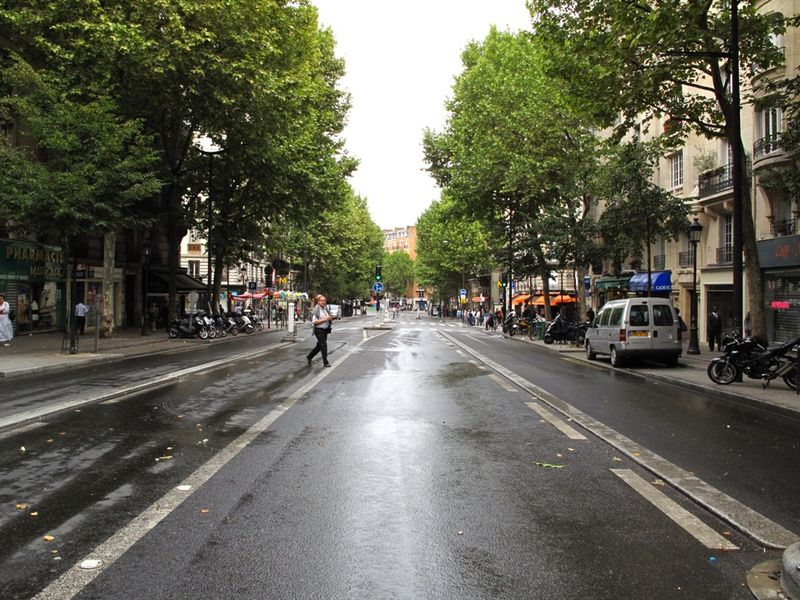
The Boulevard Barbès

The Boulevard Barbès is a boulevard in the 18th arrondissement of Paris. It is named after French politician Armand Barbès. It was built in 1867 during Haussmann's renovation of Paris. It starts at the boulevard de la Chapelle and ends at the rue Ordener. It is 835 metres long and 35 metres wide.

== Notable buildings ==
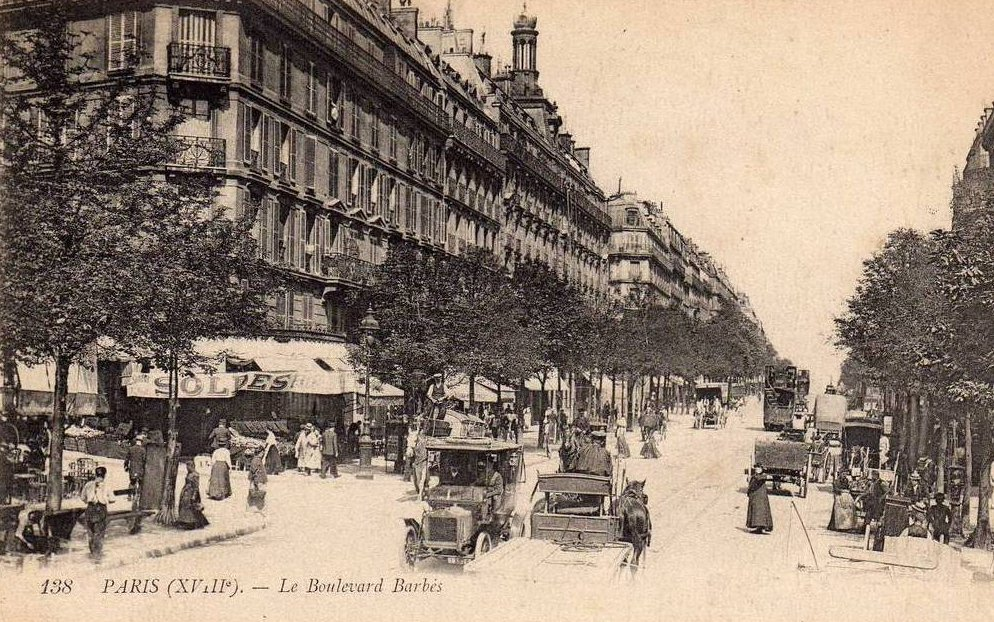
The Boulevard Barbès, c. 1900

- Nos. 11, 13 & 15: the buildings of the former Grands Magasins Dufayel. In 1856, Jacques François Crespin opened the « Palais de la Nouveauté » on a section of the old rue des Poissonniers. Commerce extended on the boulevard and became in 1888 the Grands Magasins Dufayel. After a series of extensions they occupied the whole rectangle between the boulevard and the rue Christiani, the rue de Sofia and the rue de Clignancourt. The two domes at the corner of the rue Christiani and the rue de Sofia were constructed in 1910. The Grands Magasins closed in 1930.
- No. 90: the church of Saint-Paul de Montmartre is a Lutheran church, opened in 1897. It was the work of Adolphe Augustin Rey.

== In popular culture ==
- L'automne à Barbès Rochechouart, a song by Jean-Claude Vannier
- Les Héros de Barbès, a song by Yves Simon
- Get Low, a song by Dillon Francis and DJ Snake
- La Zoubida, a song by Lagaf'
- Barbès, an album by Rachid Taha
- B.E.Z.B.A.R., a song by Scred Connexion
- Viens faire un tour à Barbès, a song by Scred Connexion's Ahmed Koma with DJ Maze and Cheb Tarik
- Thé à la menthe, a song by La Caution
- Historias de un arrabal parisino, a semi-autobiographical novel by Vicente Ulive-Schnell
- Barbès, a song by Fédération Française de Fonck (FFF)
- Orchestre national de Barbès, a Parisan-based band influenced by Gnawa and other popular music of the North Africans who immigrated settled in the Barbès neighborhood in the second half of the 20th century.

== See also ==
Barbès – Rochechouart (Paris Métro) station, and neighborhood
