= KVBE =

KVBE may refer to:

- KVBE-LP, a low-power radio station (89.5 FM) licensed to serve Portland, Oregon, United States
- KXLI, a radio station (94.5 FM) licensed to serve Moapa, Nevada, United States, which held the call sign KVBE from 2008 to 2011
