= Iran Is Not the Problem =

Iran (is not the problem)
- Directed by: Aaron Newman
- Written by: Aaron Newman
- Produced by: Aaron Newman
- Cinematography: Jim Serchak
- Edited by: Aaron Newman
- Music by: Anomaly Arts
- Release date: July 28, 2008 (USA)
- Running time: 79 mins
- Language: English

Iran (is not the problem) or Iran is not the problem (2008) Iranian documentary film directed, produced and written by Aaron Newman.

== Plot ==
The 79-minute feature documentary argues that the American media does not reliably report on Iran's differences with the US. It also presents a view countering the international perspective that Iran's nuclear proliferation is aimed at destroying Israel, contrary to fact of the US domination of the world and its diplomatic double speak. It also appraises the democratic movement within Iran, attributes reasons for the conflicts with the US and Israel, and offers some solutions. Many opinions are screened which express their individual views.

== Cast ==
- Antonia Juhasz
- Larry Everest
- Robert Gould
- Michael Veiluva
- Mitchell Plitnick
- Jim Haber
- Majid Baradar
- David Glick
- Shahab
- Sahar Driver

== Production ==
Aaron Newman directed, produced and wrote the screenplay of the film. He also was the editor of the film. The music of the film was composed by Anomaly Arts. Jim Serchak was the cinematographer of the film. Maria Byerley was the illustrator with sound recording by Michael Schrecker and animation done by Jake Mathew.

Newman is an activist who speaks for anti-imperialism and pro-democracy, and is the foundermember of the SF Chomsky Book Club, and a member of Hands Off Iran club. The documentary is produced with the aim of creating a purposeful discussion on Iran. There is also a 20-minute DVD version meant to be presented in meetings.
