= Olivier Rosset =

French music entrepreneur

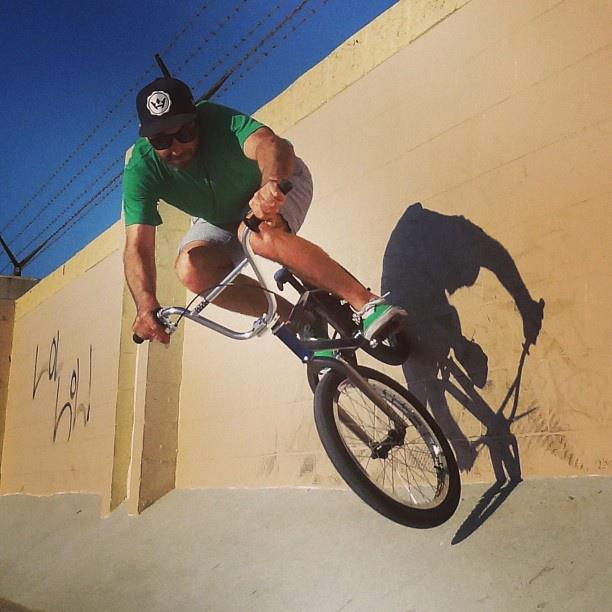
- French music entrepreneur Olivier Rosset
- Born: July 14, 1971 (age 54)
- Occupations: Founder of Chronowax, Co-Founder of Official.fm

Olivier Rosset (born July 14, 1971) is a French music entrepreneur, founder of Chronowax and co-founder of Official.fm. He also worked for V2 Music Group as A&R and general manager. In his early years, Rosset was also a professional bmx rider between 1990 and 1993.

== Origins ==
Rosset was born and raised in France in a strong musical environment and began BMX at the age of 10. He, eventually turned BMX pro rider in 1991 and travelled regularly to United States for contests and created strong creative connexions with American rap artists. In the early 90s, Rosset started to promote rap shows in Switzerland for artists such as Lords of the Underground, Dj Cut Killer, Fugees, Assassin, La Cliqua, Lunatic before relocating to Paris where he started working on music production and management in collaboration with artists such as DJ Mehdi and La Cliqua.

== Music ==
=== Distribution & Production ===
In 1998, Rosset founded Chronowax, an innovative distribution and production company based in Paris. Chronowax started as a key actor for the growing French rap scene. The company's roaster will later represent more than 300 labels such as SubPop, Def Jam, Secretly Canadian and Ed Banger and sold more than 30 million records between 1998 and 2005. In 2000, Chronowax got acquired by Richard Branson V2 Music Group. from 2003 to 2005, Rosset played a pivotal role at V2 Music Group as an A&R and general manager. He signed and developed early careers of bands like TTC, The Knife, BLoc Party, Chromeo and Kourtrajmé.

=== Digital ===
In 2010, Rosset co-founded Official.fm, an online music hosting and publishing platform including developing tools for copyright owners, media publishers, music professionals. artists such as Wiz Khalifa, Diplo, redbull, Universal or Sony. Official.fm got acquired by private investors in 2011. Prior to Official.fm, Rosset also co-founded with Jean-François Groff, Fairtilizer, an audio publishing service.

=== Music/Technology/Brand advisor ===
Since 2011, Rosset is an active advisory board member and/or investor of innovative internet companies such as Shuffler.fm, Ubicmedia, and had been consulting for brands like Vivendi, LVMH, Warner, Nike Adidas, Vans ...
