= Rocca (rapper) =

French-Colombian rapper and producer

- Born: Sébastian Rocca; 27 April 1975 (age 51); Paris, France
- Genres: French hip hop, hip hop
- Occupations: Rapper, composer
- Years active: 1990–present
- Label: El Original Production/PIAS Recordings/Believe Digital

Rocca (full name Sébastian Rocca) is a French-Colombian rapper and producer born on 27 April 1975 in Paris. Rocca was known as one of the best lyricists in French Rap. He gained recognition as a rapper during the 1990s as a part of the influential rap group, La Cliqua. He also was a member of Tres Coronas. He is a cousin of well known Juan Pablo, Gabriela, Camila, and Juanita Rocca.

== Biography ==
=== The La Cliqua years ===
As a part of La Cliqua, Rocca toured radios and stages, and then released, in 95, a first EP, now considered a master piece of French Rap: "Conçu pour durer" (Built to Last) on Arsenal Records. Rocca delivered, for the first time on record, his then eccentric rhyming style alongside his microphone associates: Daddy Lord C, Kohndo (Doc Odnock), Raphaël (Raphton), Egosyst (Aarafat), Dj Jelahee (Gallegos), Lumumba, Le Chimiste and Mush le Phonky Bwana. Kohndo, Egosyst and Lumumba formed the group Coup d'État Phonique, while Daddy Lord C and Rocca teamed up as La Squadra. The record was an immediate success in the French Hip-Hop scene. Quickly Arsenal Records signed with major label Barclay, and La Cliqua worked on their next project released in 1996 as a compilation album: "Arsenal Represente le Vrai Hip-Hop" (Arsenal represents the Real Hip-Hop). The record featured all members of La Cliqua and their young affiliates: Petit Boss and Cercle Vicieux. Critically acclaimed, La Cliqua became a major feature on the French Hip-Hop landscape. They opened for Arrested Development at the Olympia in Paris and performed in New York City at the Zulu Nation Anniversary. Following in the footsteps of "Represente le Vrai Hip-Hop", Rocca was the first emcee from La Cliqua to release a solo album: "Entre Deux Monde" which featured Kohndo on: "Mot pour mot" and "Rap Contact 2". In 1997, Egosyst, Rocca's rhyme partner on "Coup d’Etat Phonique" decided to leave La Cliqua.

=== The Tres Coronas years ===
Tres Coronas formed in New York City in 2001 by Rocca, fellow Colombian rapper P.N.O. with Dominican rapper Reychesta Secret Weapon.

=== La Cliqua Reunion ===
In April 2008, Rocca and the other members of La Cliqua (minus Raphael) came back together for a performance at the Festival l'Original in Lyon. This successful, unexpected, reunion which resurrected on stage some of La Cliqua's classic repertoire, was followed in January 2009 by a sold-out concert in Paris, at the Elysée Montmartre.

== Discography ==
=== With La Cliqua ===
- 1994 Cut Killer & La Cliqua – Mixtape N°11 (Double H Production)
- 1995 Conçu pour durer (EP, Arsenal Records)
- 1996 Le Vrai Hip-Hop (LP - Arsenal Records)
- 1996 Le Vrai Hip-Hop (Nouvelle Édition)(LP - Arsenal Records)
- 1999 La Cliqua (Album, Arsenal Records)
- 1999 Pas De Place Pour Les Traîtres
- 2007 Le meilleur, les classiques (Compilation Album, Arsenal Records)

=== With Tres Coronas ===
- 2001: "Mixtape" (Parcero Productions/5-27 Records)
- 2002: "Mixtape Remix" (Parcero Production/R.C Music/Profeta Discos)
- 2003: "New York Mixtape" (Parcero Productions/Ecko Unltd.)
- 2005: "Nuestra Cosa" (Parcero Productions/2Good)
- 2006: "Nuestra Cosa: Deluxe Edition" (Parcero Productions/Machete Music)
- 2007: "Street Album" (Parcero Productions)
- 2008: "Mas Fuerte" (Parcero Productions/Wrung/Boa Música)
- 2011: "La Música Es Mi Arma" (Audio Lírica Entertainment/Parcero Productions)
- 2011: "La Música Es Mi Arma: Deluxe Edition" (Audio Lírica Entertainment/Parcero Productions)

=== As A Solo Artist ===
- 1997 Entre Deux Mondes (Arsenal Records/Barclay)

2001 : Elevación (Barclay)

2003 : Amour Suprême (Barclay)

2012 : Le Calme Sous La Pluie (Musicast)

2015 : Bogotá-París (El Original Production/PIAS Recordings/Believe Digital)

=== Notable appearances ===
- 1995

La Squadra - Requiem on La Haine's soundtrack (1995)
Assassin Feat Rocca, Daddy Lord C, Djamal, Ekoué, Stomy Bugsy, Sté & Undaconnexion - L'undaground s'exprime on Assassin's maxi, L'odyssée suit son cours (1995)
Sleo Feat Rocca, Fabe, Lady Laistee, Osez, LSO & Bruno - Ne joue pas avec le feu on Sleo's album, Ensemble pour l'aventure (1995)

- 1996

2Bal 2Neg Feat Rocca, Monsieur R & Vensty - Labyrinthe on 2Bal 2Neg's album, 3 X plus efficace (1996)
La Cliqua - Rap contact on the compilation Arsenal Records représente le vrai Hip Hop
Rocca - Le Hip Hop mon royaume on the compilation Arsenal Records représente le vrai Hip Hop
La Squadra - Là d'où l'on vient on the compilation Arsenal Records représente le vrai Hip Hop
La Cliqua - Paris la nuit on the compilation Arsenal Records représente le vrai Hip Hop

- 1997

La Cliqua - Apocalypse on the mixtape Invasion
La Squadra - Là d'où l'on vient on the compilation L 432
N.A.P Feat Rocca - Sans regret on N.A.P.'s album, La Fin du monde
La Squadra - Un dernier jour sur Terre on the mixtape Cut Killer show

- 1998

Daddy Lord C Feat Rocca - Le contrat on Daddy Lord C's album, Le noble art
Rainmen Feat La Squadra - Rien ne changera
Rocca - La Fama Remix on the compilation Collectif Rap Vol.1

- 1999

Big Red Feat Rocca - El dia de los muertes on Big Red's album, Big Redemption
Rocca Feat Raphael - Sous un grand ciel gris on the compilation Le Groove prend le maki
La Cliqua - Les quartiers chauffent on the compilation L'univers des lascars
Rocca Feat Hamed Daye, Shurik'n & Kery James - Animalement votre on the compilation Première classe Vol.1

- 2000

Monsieur R Feat Rocca, La Brigade & Rockin' Squat - Tu veux savoir on Monsieur R's album, Anticonstitutionnellement

- 2001

Rocca - Morts les enfants on the compilation Hexagone 2001
Rocca Feat Ill & Eloquence - Paris on the compilation Mission suicide
Wallen Feat Rocca - Llama me on Wallen's album, A force de vivre
Rocca - Animalement votre Remix on the compilation Une spéciale pour les halls

- 2002

Rocca Feat Niro - Qui a le son on the compilation Niroshima 2

- 2003

Rocca - Traffic on the compilation French touch Vol.2

- 2004

Rocca Feat Big Red - Redvolution on the compilation Reaggae sound system

- 2005

Rocca Feat The Beatnuts - Bring it back on the compilation The basement
Pelson Feat Rocca - Konection

- 2006

Rocca - Illicite on the compilation Narcobeat 2: Règlement de compte
Mastock Feat Rocca - Pas de kaille ici on Mastock's Street CD, J'avais prévenu
Zahariya Feat Rocca - Donner l'envie

- 2008

Rocca - Festival L'Original - Lyon - Transbordeur - La Cliqua

- 2009

Rocca - La Vida Loca documentary soundtrack

- 2011

Appears in CAN I KICK IT ? #2

- 2012

Tu le reconnais with Alpha Wann

Rocca - Le Calme sous la Pluie (EP) 2012, released on 18 June on iTunes
