= Historias de un arrabal parisino =

2006 novel by Vicente Ulive-Schnell

Stories of a Parisian suburb
- Author: Vicente Ulive-Schnell
- Original title: Historias de un arrabal parisino
- Language: Spanish
- Published: 2006 (Ediciones Idea)
- Publication place: Spain
- ISBN: 9788496740822

Historias de un arrabal parisino (Stories of a Parisian suburb) is the third novel by the Venezuelan author Vicente Ulive-Schnell and was published by Ediciones Idea in Spain. The edition published by Ediciones Idea had the support and contribution of Spanish photographer Tarek Ode, who gave one of his works for the cover and who presented the book in the Elder House of Tenerife in the company of the author.

The book is semi-biographical, based on two articles that appeared in both the online and print editions of the New York newspaper El Nuevo Cojo Ilustrado in 2004. It was first written in French during Ulive-Schnell's education in Paris; however, his poor French language abilities initially lead to him considering abandoning the work. He was approached by a Mexican publishing house, which offered to publish it in Spanish, leading to him translating the complete manuscript in ten days.

== Summary ==
The novel recounts the adventures of a young Venezuelan student in Paris, and his travels through the city's most distressed neighborhoods, Barbès and Château-Rouge.
