= Chronowax =

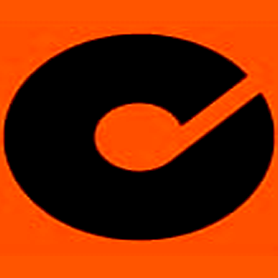
- Founded: 1998
- Founder: Olivier Rosset
- Genre: Various
- Country of origin: France
- Location: Paris

Chronowax was a record distribution and production company based in Paris launched by music entrepreneur Olivier Rosset in 1998.

Chronowax started as a key anchor for the growing French rap scene. The company's roster would later represent more than 300 labels such as SubPop, Def Jam, Secretly Canadian, and Ed Banger and sold more than 30 million records between 1998 and 2005.

In 2000, Chronowax was acquired by Richard Branson V2 Music Group . From 2003 to 2005, Chronowax developed its own label, signed and developed early careers of bands like TTC, The Knife, Bloc Party, Chromeo, and Kourtrajmé.

In 2006, Chronowax got shut down by V2 Music while being bought by Universal Music.
