= DJ Maze =

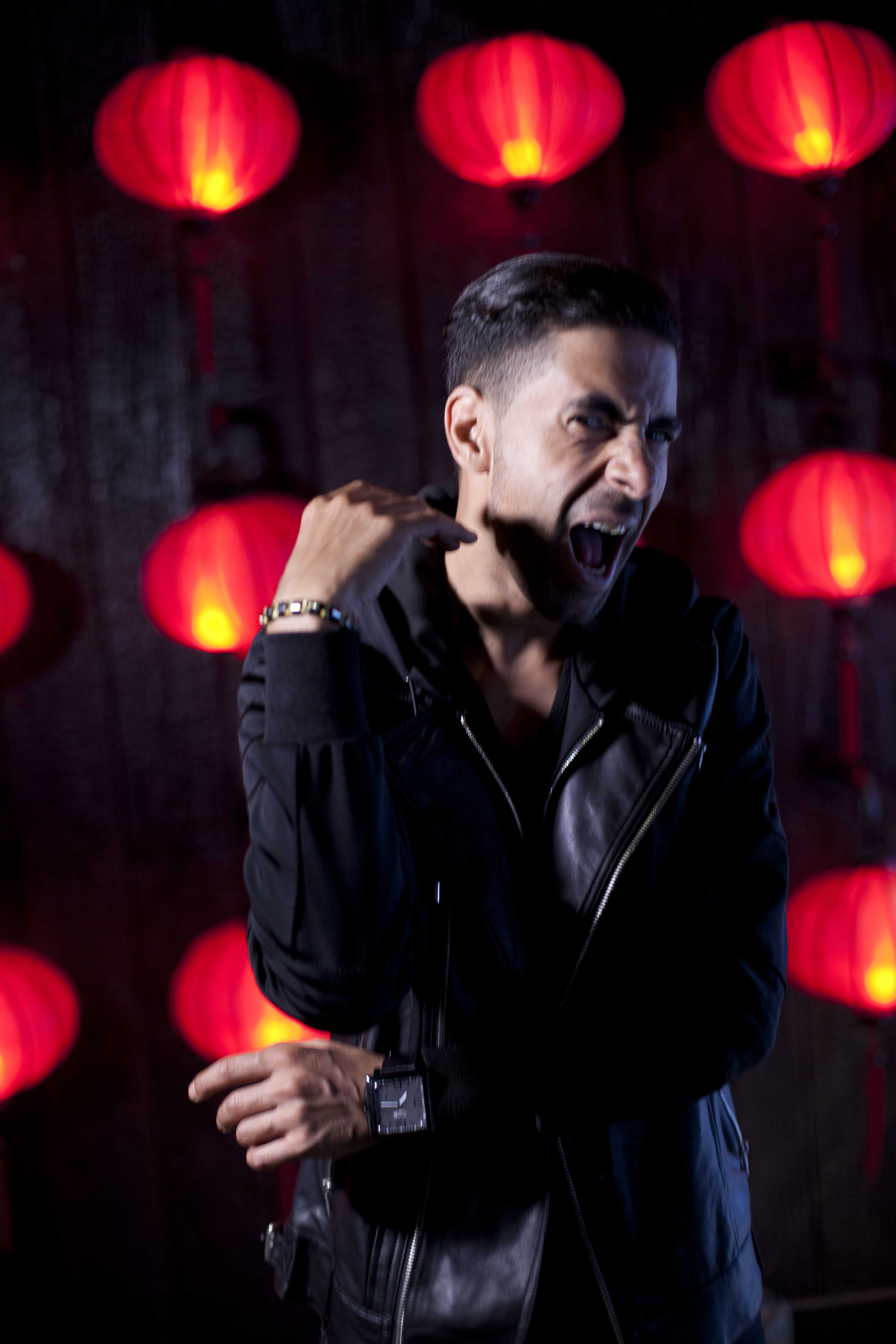

Background information
- Born: Paris Region
- Genres: Hip hop
- Occupations: DJ, compositor, producer, director
- Years active: 1998–present
- Label: Allezgo productions
- Website: http://www.djmaze.com/

DJ Maze is a French hip hop DJ, compositor and director from the Paris region.

== Music ==
DJ, compositor and producer, DJ Maze released about fifty albums and sold more than a million, certified SNEP. Mariah Carey, The Black Eyed Peas and Usher asked him to perform the opening act in 17,000-person venues. He also performed in the most prestigious clubs in France, Belgium, Switzerland, England and Dubai.

DJ Maze is a Platinum selling artist for "Ragga Connection", a compilation mixed by DJ Xela (February 2002) and then a Gold selling artist for "Ragga Connection 2"(November 2002).

With seven tracks ranked in the Beatport Top 100 early 2017 and more than 60 000 Facebook fans, DJ Maze no longer has to prove his recognition among DJs and the general public.

He collaborated with : Charly Black, Mr Vegas, L'Algérino, Marlo Rank's, NK, General Levy, Sheraz, Rebakam, M'Passi, Cheb Tarik, Ahmed Koma, Big Red, Jmi Sissoko, Djenna, Ejm, Alias L.J, Djam-L, Deen, La Harissa, Shaka Y Dres, Dina Rae, Truth Hurts, Mohamed Lamine, J'One, Atyka, Samplays, Ortal, Blex, Mr R, Rekta, Lyna Mayhem, Colin High, Dirty Ninos, LIM, Beat de Boul, Scred Connexion, Rebakam, Momo Debouzze....

DJ Maze also had a radio show on a famous French radio (NRJ) and gathered more than one million listeners every night. This radio show allowed the release of a compilation : "NRJ Master Mix 2, Mixed by DJ Maze". In 2016, DJ Maze recorded a new album in the Big Yard Studio (Kingstone, Jamaique) surrounded by Jamaican artists. At the end of March 2017, DJ Maze released a new single : "Wine Nikky Wine" featuring Dane Ray.

== Soundtrack ==
In cinema, DJ MAZE composed some songs for French Spies (Double Zéro in French) with Éric Judor and Ramzy Bedia, directed by Gérard Pirès and produced by Thomas Langman (La Petite Reine) which has attracted more than 1.7 million viewers.

DJ Maze also composed "I Need Your Love" for the film Amour sur place ou à emporter, directed by Amelle Chahbi and written by, among others, Noom Diawara and Fabrice Eboué, produced by LGM Productions.

== Video director ==
In 2016, he directed the short-movie "Améthyste" written by Pascal Adam. This short-movie was in competition at the 10e Festival International du Film Policier de Liège (International Festival of Detective Film in Liège) in "La Nuit sera Courts" category. The main actress, Barbara Delleur, won the golden award for her female part in "Améthyste" in the EIFA (The European Independent Film Award) in 2016. DJ Maze also directed more than 15 music videos for confirmed artists and coming-up artists.

== Discography ==
=== Album ===
- Intro Fiction (2012)

=== Compilations ===
- The Funky Soul Story (1999)
- Maze Some Noise (Mixtape) (2000)
- The Funky Soul Story 2 (2001)
- Maze Some Noise (2002)
- R'n'B Touch Vol. 3 (2002)
- The Funky Soul Story Official (2003)
- R'n'B Dancehall Selexion (2006)
- R'n'B Touch Vol. 4 (2007)
- R'n'B Touch 5 (2009)
- R'n'B Dancehall Selexion, Pt. I (2013)
- R'n'B Dancehall Selexion, Pt. II (2013)
- R'n'B Selexion (2013)

=== Singles & EPs ===
- Party All Night Vol. 1 (1999)
- Party All Night Vol. 2 (2000)
- Party All Night Vol. 3 (2001)
- Sexy Lady (Bad Exercice) - Feat Marlo Rank's (2001)
- Party All Night Vol. 4 (2002)
- 1ère fois - Feat NK & Koma (2002)
- Stik'um Up - Feat General Levy (2002)
- For the Club - Feat Selwin (2002)
- Pas un mec pour toi - Feat Sheraz & Rebakam (2002)
- Allez de l'avant - Feat M'Passi (2003)
- Viens Faire un Tour à Barbès - Feat Cheb Tarik & Ahmed Koma (2003)
- Lady Marmelade - Feat Sheraze & Marlo Rank's (2004)
- International Crew - Feat Big Red & Jmi Sissoko (2006)
- As-tu déjà connu l'Amour - Feat Djenna (2006)
- Dans un Night Club - Feat Ejm, Alias L.J & Djam-L (2006)
- Notre Histoire - Feat Deen & NK (2006)
- Party All Night Vol.5 (2007)
- Party All Night: Integrale (2008)
- Maze Some Noise Together (2009)
- Pour Elle - Feat Djenna (2009)
- C'est pour ça qu'on les aime (2010)
- Falling in Love - Feat Dina Rae, La Harissa & Shaka Y Dres (2010)
- So Many Times (2011)
- Pour la vie - Feat Truth Hurts & Mohamed Lamine (2012)
- Bruxelles-Paname - Feat Saad & DJ Snoop (2012)
- Ya Tu Sabes - Feat J'One, Atyka & Samplays (2012)
- Party All Night Vol. 6 (2013)
- Party All Night Vol. 7 (2013)
- Plus près de moi - Feat Ortal (2013)
- Avec mes Ladies - Feat Lyna Mayhem (2015)
- Bajo el Sol - Feat Blex (2016)
- Wine Nikky Wine - Feat Dane Ray (2017)

=== Remixes ===
- Maze Remix One (2000)
- Take Ya Home - Feat Lil Bow Wow (2001)
- Maze Remix Two (2001)
- Maze Remix Three (2003)
- Maze Remix Four (2004)
- Maze Remix Five (2005)
- Maze Some Noise Together Remix (2009)
- Maze Remix: L'Intégrale (2011)

=== DJ Tools ===
- P2S News (2000)
- The Battle Movies (2010)
- The Battle Movies Vol. 2 (2012)
- The Battle Movies Vol. 3 (2013)
- The Battle Movies 'Essentials Acapellas" (2016)
- The Battle Movies, Vol. 5 (2017)
