= Sens Unik =

Swiss hip hop group

Sens Unik is a Swiss Hip hop group from Lausanne, Switzerland, which was founded in 1987 and disbanded in 2010. They later reunited in 2024 and have been touring since.

Sens Unik received 4 gold records and contributed to music of films La Haine and Neutre. Its six members are Just One, Carlos Leal, Rade, Déborah, Osez and Laurent Biollay. Their 1997 published track "Original", which consists of a collaboration with the German hip-hop group Die Fantastischen Vier reached number 27 of the Swiss and number 73 of the German single charts.

For their song "Le vent tourne", released on the album Panorama 91-97, the group was inspired by the French film La Haine. The song also appeared on a special compilation for the film, La Haine, inspirée musique du film, but not on the soundtrack.

== Discography ==
=== Albums and EPs ===
- 1991 – Le VIième Sens (EP)
- 1992 – Les portes du temps (Album), CH#12
- 1994 – Chromatic (Album), CH#4
- 1996 – Tribulations (Album), CH#8
- 1997 – Panorama 91-97 (Compilation-LP), CH#5
- 1998 – Pole Position (Album), CH#9
- 1999 – Propaganda Live (Live-Album), CH#26
- 2001 – Abracadabra (Album), CH#12
- 2004 – Mea culpa (Album), CH#8
- 2004 – Galaxy 1991-2004 (Compilation-LP), CH#52
- 2010 – Generations (Best-of-Album), CH#3

=== Singles ===
- 1991 – Nouvelle Politique (Maxi-Single)
- 1992 – Rira bien (Maxi-Single)
- 1992 – Hijo del Latino (Maxi-Single)
- 1993 – À gauche, à droite (Maxi-Single)
- 1994 – Laisse toi aller (Maxi-Single), CH#33
- 1995 – What I've Got I&II (Maxi-Single)
- 1996 – Paquito (Maxi-Single), CH#45
- 1997 – Original (feat. Fanta 4) (Maxi-Single), CH#27
- 1998 – Zak et Loly (Maxi-Single), CH#32
- 2001 – C'est la vie (Maxi-Single), CH#49
- 2004 – Charly (Maxi-Single), CH#63
- 2010 – Sur tes ondes, CH#66
