= KXLI =

Radio station in Moapa, Nevada

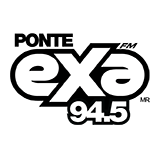
- Moapa, Nevada; United States
- Broadcast area: Las Vegas Valley; St. George, Utah
- Frequency: 94.5 MHz
- Branding: Exa FM

Programming
- Language: Spanish
- Format: Contemporary hit radio
- Affiliations: MVS Radio

Ownership
- Owner: Radio Activo Broadcasting, LLC; (Radio Activo Broadcasting License, LLC)
- Sister stations: KADD, KDYL

History
- First air date: December 13, 2006
- Former call signs: KMOA (2006–2008); KVBE (2008–2011)
- Call sign meaning: Sounds like "Jelli" (previous format)

Technical information
- Licensing authority: FCC
- Facility ID: 164097
- Class: C
- ERP: 93,000 watts
- HAAT: 637 meters (2,090 ft)
- Transmitter coordinates: 36°38′7.00″N 114°7′18.00″W

Links
- Public license information: Public file; LMS
- Webcast: Listen live
- Website: exafm.com/plaza/las-vegas/

KXLI (94.5 FM; Exa FM) is a commercial radio station licensed to Moapa, Nevada, United States, and serving the Las Vegas Valley as a rimshot. It is owned by Activo Broadcasting LLC, with studios and offices on South Eastern Avenue in Las Vegas.

KXLI has an effective radiated power (ERP) of 93,000 watts using horizontal polarization. Its transmitter is near the Arizona border south of Bunkerville. The station also operates several co-channel boosters: KXLI-FM-1 in Las Vegas, KXLI-FM-2 in North Las Vegas and KXLI-FM-3 in Henderson.

== History ==
94.5 signed on as KMOA under the branding "Rehab Radio" on May 2, 2008. Rehab Radio was a stunt format that aired while the station was testing the transmitter, playing dance music. The call sign changed to KVBE on May 6, 2008, and the identity as "94.5 The Vibe" was begun on May 8, 2008. The launch was co-consulted by dance radio veterans Trevor Simpson from the now defunct KNGY “Energy 92.7” in San Francisco, California, Joel Salkowitz from the now defunct WNYZ-LP “Pulse 87.7” in New York City, and Mark "Tic Tak" Allen of KUPL/98.7 FM in Portland, Oregon. The Vibe was programmed by industry veteran Rob Walker as a Dance Hits format, with imaging done by Mitch Craig. In November 2009, KVBE's signal repeater added crucial coverage within the Las Vegas area, since the primary coverage area does not fully reach the city of Las Vegas in most places.

In March 2010, the station's operations were taken over by D2 Media, LLC. It began reimaging itself on air (with Mitch Craig being phased out, replaced by St. John), launching a new website (with vibevegas.com being phased out, replaced by 945thevibe.com), and a new logo was unveiled. More mixshows and some of the top mix DJs were featured including: John Digweed, Carl Cox, Roger Sanchez, Manufactured Superstars, Eddie Halliwell, Markus Schulz, Armin Van Buuren, Jordan Stevens, Paul Oakenfold, DJ Vegas Vibe, DJ Maze, Matt Darey, Dave Onex, and Beaux Tech.

As of July 2010, while still claiming itself as a Dance station, KVBE's playlist format was refocused to a Rhythmic Top 40 which played Dance remixes of Top 40 tracks. But over time The Vibe began incorporating more Dance Hits into the format. The new format was under guidance by Michael Oaks (Mike O.), owner of Energy 98 and 2004 - 2005 program director of now defunct KNRJ ("Energy 92.7 & 101.1") in Phoenix, and Mark "Tic Tak" Allen of KUPL/98.7 in Portland, Oregon. The station imaging by St. John was phased out, and Rich Van Slyke became the new voice of The Vibe until mid-April 2011 when Emma Clarke, the same person who voiced Pulse 87 in New York City, became the new voice of The Vibe.

On July 1, 2011, Jelli took over KVBE and KHIJ under an LMA, under which the two stations (renamed KXLI and KYLI) would broadcast interactive "Top 40 Remix" and rock formats respectively. Listeners would be able to control the stations' content by upvoting and downvoting songs in real-time with the company's mobile app. After the LMA took effect, the Vibe branding later moved to KHWY, initially as a late-night block, and later as a full-time format (under the Highway Vibe branding) until November 2021 (when it flipped to hot adult contemporary).

The station was placed on sale on eBay during January 2012. The "Buy It Now" price for the station was $8,950,000, but when the auction closed on January 29, 2012, the winning bid was $305,100, a fraction of the asking price. The owner of Aurora Media, Scott Mahalick, acquired the station for $22 million, but due to the economic crisis, estimated the station's current worth at $10 million. Mahalick claims that this was the first time a radio station was sold on eBay; however, at least one other station, a 6,000-watt AM station in Texas, was put for auction in 2009. Also, in 2007, another broadcasting property, television station WMKG-CA in Muskegon, Michigan, was auctioned on eBay.

On July 1, 2012, as a result of the sale, KXLI changed their format to Spanish Top 40 CHR using the "Exa FM" format brand from MVS Radio of Mexico. Aurora Media sold the station to Radio Activo Broadcasting on August 2, 2012, at a purchase price of $3 million.

On October 16, 2020, KXLI flipped from Mexico's "Exa FM" to Spanish AC branded as "Exito 94.5". On January 9, 2022, KXLI switched again, returned from Spanish AC branded as "Exito 94.5" to Mexico's "Exa FM".
