= Les Sages Poètes de la Rue =

French hip hop band

Les Sages Poètes de la Rue (The Wise Poets of the Street): Dany Dan, Melopheelo and Zoxea, are a French hip hop band that has profoundly influenced and keeps influencing their musical genre as a band or through their solo career.

== History ==
Les Sages Poètes de la Rue made their first apparition on the hip-hop scene in 1993 on the Cool Sessions compilation and on the original soundtrack of the movie La Haine with "Bon Baiser du Poste" (With love from the Police station).

Far from the hardcore trend, Les Sages Poètes de la Rue, choosing an old-school approach on jazzy vibes, released their first album, Qu'est ce qui fait marcher les Sages in 1995. Jimmy Jay and MC Solaar are the executive producer of this album, while Les Sages Poètes de la Rue sign their own beats and lyrics. The same year they collaborated with Sinclair for the remix of Tranquille.

With the success of their first album, Les Sages Poètes de la Rue formed their own structure, Beat de Boul, in order to help the groups of their area to make it into the hip hop industry. Amongst these groups are the famous Lunatic, Malekal Morte, Movez’ Lang and Less du Neuf. Beat de Boul releases Dans la Sono (In the Soundsystem) in 1997 and Les Sages Poètes de la Rue came back the following year with their second album Jusqu’à l’Amour and are acclaimed by both their public and the media.

Les Sages Poètes de la Rue returned to the studio in 2002 for their third album Après l’Orage. Although an independent band, Les Sages Poètes de la Rue decided to sign with BMG for this album.

Their fourth album, Trésors Enfouis was released in 2005. The public still loyal to the band welcomes this album “concept”.

Les Sages Poètes de la Rue are currently planning their come back with a fifth album featuring theme of peace and unity, jazz-influenced elements and hip-hop beats. This album was schedule released in 2010 and the group released the second volume of Tresors Enfouis as a teaser.

== Discography ==
- 1995 Qu'est ce qui fait marcher les Sages (What makes the wise walk)
- 1998 Jusqu'à l'Amour (Till Love)
- 2002 Après l'Orage (After the Storm)
- 2005 Trésors Enfouis (Hidden Treasures)
- 2008 Trésors Enfouis 2 (Hidden Treasures Volume 2)
- 2017 Art contemporain (Contemporary art)
