= La Cliqua =

La Cliqua is a French hip hop group from the golden era of French Rap. Its members are Rocca, a bilingual French rapper with Colombian roots, Kohndo (formerly known as Doc Odnok), Daddy Lord C, Egosyst (Aarafat), Raphaël (Raphton), Dj Jelahee (Gallegos), Lumumba, Le Chimiste and Mush le Phonky Bwana. Kohndo, Egosyst and Lumumba formed the group Coup d'État Phonique, while Daddy Lord C and Rocca teamed up as La Squadra.

== Discography ==
=== La Cliqua ===
- 1994 Cut Killer & La Cliqua – Mixtape N°11 (Double H Production)
- 1995 Conçu pour durer (EP, Arsenal Records)
- 1996 Le Vrai Hip-Hop (LP - Arsenal Records)
- 1996 Le Vrai Hip-Hop (Nouvelle Édition)(LP - Arsenal Records)
- 1999 La Cliqua (Album, Arsenal Records)
- 1999 Pas De Place Pour Les Traîtres
- 2007 Le meilleur, les classiques (Compilation Album, Arsenal Records)

=== Rocca (while a solo member of La Cliqua) ===
- 1996 Le Hip-Hop mon Royaume (Single, Arsenal Records - Barclay)
- 1997 Entre Deux Mondes (Album, Arsenal Records - Barclay)
- 1997 La Fama (La Renomée) (Single, Arsenal Records - Barclay)
- 1997 Les Jeunes de l'Univers (Single, Arsenal Records - Barclay)
- 1997 Mot pour Mot feat. Kohndo (12 inch promo, Arsenal Records - Barclay)

=== Daddy Lord C (while a solo member of La Cliqua) ===
- 1994 Freaky Flow / Les Jaloux (12 inch, Arsenal Records)
- 1995 Freaky Flow Remix (12 inch, Arsenal Records)
- 1998 Le Noble Art (Album, Dallas Cartel)

=== Coup d'Etat Phonique ===
- 1995 Dans ma tête II (12 inch - Arsenal Records)

=== Notable appearances ===
- 1995 Requiem (La Haine original Soundtrack)
- 1995 Ne Joue Pas Avec le Feu - Sléo feat. Daddy Lord C, Rocca, Petit Boss, Fabe, Lady Laistee, Osez (Jimmy Jay Records)
- 1995 Déchire - Menelik feat. Egosyst (Jimmy Jay Records)
- 1995 Tout ce qu'on pense de toi - Double Pact feat. Egosyst et Petits Boss (Night & Day)
- 1996 Arsenal Représente le Vrai Hip Hop (Compilation, Arsenal Records - Barclay)
- 1996 Worldwide - Raphael, Loucha, Shyheim (Arsenal Records)
- 1997 On se Retrouvera - East feat. Kohndo & Daddy Lord C (Eastwoo - Double H)
- 1997 Apocalypse (Invasion Mixtape)
- 1999 Les Quartiers Chauffent (L'Univers des Lascars)
