= Cheb Tarik =

Algerian singer

- Born: Tarik Belgot
- Origin: Algeria
- Genres: Raï
- Occupation: Singer
- Label: lafami
- Website: chebtarik.net

Cheb Tarik (real name Tarik Belgot) is an Algerian musician, now based in Paris, France, and signed to Universal Music Group. His first hit, "Reggae Raï" was a cover, and a tribute to the song "Reggae Night" by Cheb Hasni, a musician assassinated in Oran, Algeria by Islamic fundamentalists.

"Reggae Raï" held a place in the charts for several weeks, exceeded 171,000 in sales and went on to appear in several compilations.

== Life ==
In 2001, Tarik contributed to the compilation Big Men, a blend of raï and reggae. Known for featuring a diversity of musical genres, the album became a hit thanks to the single, "J'ai pas besoin." Tarik's name was thrown into the limelight, with sales exceeding six million.

He has participated in the song "J'ai vu trop de frères partir" on Album "Du mal a s'confier" by Scred Connexion.

To date, Cheb Tarik has published three albums, and six singles. The albums include:

- Rai'tistick
- Metisstyle
- Option RAÏ
