= Journalism in American film and television =

Journalism has been depicted frequently throughout the 20th century in American pop culture media, such as motion pictures and television. For decades, movies about journalism either have criticized bad journalism or celebrated good journalism. Since the 1930s, more than 100 films have had a journalism theme or recounted journalism history. Because of the early 20th century beginnings in the newspaper industry in the United States, these films focused on the print industry. After the 1976 release of “All the President's Men,” an increased number of young people inspired by the watchdog and investigative function of newspapers entered journalism programs at colleges and universities. As television and radio news launched into prominence in the 1960s and later, more movies about broadcast journalism were produced.

Various reasons surround the question of why the entertainment industry glorifies American journalism. James Vanderbilt, writer and director of the 2015 film “Truth,” offered a theory that reporters often are the central characters in a film because they are detectives with pens. “There is something inherently interesting about someone who comes to work every day saying, ‘I’m going to get to the bottom of this,’” Vanderbilt said in an interview published in The New York Times. Journalism stories also contain action, an attribute noticed in the 2015 films “Spotlight” and “Truth.”

Several Hollywood actors have played leading roles in motion pictures about journalism. For instance, veteran actor Robert Redford starred in at least two known movies about journalism: “All the President’s Men” in 1976 and “Truth” in 2015, both acclaimed motion pictures. Another seasoned actor, Michael Keaton, also has acted in two films about the newspaper industry, “The Paper” in 1994 and the Academy Award-winning “Spotlight” in 2015.

Some movies about journalism reflect critical moments in the industry or in U.S. history. Other films, along with television shows, use satire to poke fun at news reporters and their lifestyles. There also are films that do not concentrate solely on journalism as an industry but feature characters who are journalists in the movie's plot. The movie, “Superman,” is an example, in which two central characters, Lois Lane and Clark Kent, work as newspaper reporters, but the movie's plot does not center on the news business. These movies feature a variety of angles and concepts that can be explored in entertainment or educational settings.

Movies' relationships to the press reflects both positive and negative outlooks that popular culture has with the press. Institutional and cultural tensions within journalism are portrayed by pop culture media. To observe these various portrayals of journalism in film productions through the decades of the 20th and early 21st centuries, the movie titles listed below are discussed briefly, with year of release, distribution company and running times also included in parentheses. The movies in this list are rooted heavily in the print industry. It is not until the 1970s when films began using television newsrooms as a plot's setting. Hollywood's inclusion of broadcast journalism also is noticed in TV shows during this decade, such as “The Mary Tyler Moore Show.” TV program titles also have been selected to serve as examples of Hollywood's fascination with the electronic world of journalism. They are discussed at the end.

== Motion pictures ==
1930s

The Front Page

(1931, United Artists, 101 minutes)

Based on the hit Broadway comedy with the same name about tabloid newspaper reporters on the police beat, the movie centers on a reporter, Hildebrand “Hildy” Johnson, played by Pat O'Brien, and his editor who hope to scoop a big story involving an escaped accused murderer and hide him in a roll-top desk while everybody else tries to find him. In 2010, this film was selected for preservation in the U.S. National Film Registry by the Library of Congress as being "culturally, historically, or aesthetically significant.”

Nothing Sacred

(1937, United Artists, 75 minutes)

This film, directed by William Wellman and written by former Chicago newspaper reporter Ben Hecht, is about New York newspaper reporter Wally Cook, played by Fredric March, who is blamed for passing off a penniless Harlem resident as the "Sultan of Mazipan" at a charity event. Cook's boss Oliver Stone, played by Walter Connolly, demotes Cook to writing obituaries but then gives the ambitious reporter another chance. Cook travels to Warsaw, Vermont, to interview Hazel Flagg, played by Carole Lombard, a woman supposedly dying of radium poisoning. Cook, however, learns that the diagnosis was incorrect. Still, Cook convinces Flagg to pretend the original diagnosis was correct, resulting in a series of sob news stories and national headlines.

1940s

Foreign Correspondent

(1940, United Artists, 119 minutes)

This early spy thriller directed by Alfred Hitchcock tells the story of an American crime reporter, played by Joel McCrae, who turns into a foreign correspondent to try to expose enemy spies who are involved in a fictional continent-wide conspiracy in the prelude to World War II. It also stars Robert Benchley, who wrote the column, “The Wayward Press,” for The New Yorker at the time of this film.

Citizen Kane

(1941, RKO, 119 minutes)

Orson Welles directed, starred and produced this film that appeared to fictionalize certain events and people in the career of William Randolph Hearst, a powerful newspaper magnate and publisher. However, Welles maintained that his film depicted the career of Col. Robert R. McCormick, who published the Chicago Tribune.

Call Northside 777

(1948, Twentieth Century Fox Film Corporation, 111 minutes)

Newspaper reporter P.J. McNeal (James Stewart) for the Chicago Times investigates & attempts to prove that a man jailed for murder was wrongly convicted 11 years earlier.

1950s

Ace in the Hole

(1951, Paramount, 112 minutes)

This film touches on the ethical aspects of journalism. Kirk Douglas stars as a disgraced reporter working for an Albuquerque newspaper and who is in search of a pressing news sensation. He exploits a story about a man trapped in a cave to revitalize his career, but the situation quickly escalates into out of control.

Deadline U.S.A.

(1952, 20th Century-Fox, 86 minutes)

With his large metropolitan newspaper about to be sold, crusading editor Ed Hutcheson, played by Humphrey Bogart, tries to expose a gangster's crimes to save his newspaper. The film also stars Ethel Barrymore as the paper's publisher.

1970s

All the President’s Men

(1976, Warner Bros., 138 minutes)

Arguably the most popular and celebrated motion picture about journalism exposing the corruption of elected officials, this film is believed to be responsible for a surge of ambitious students into college journalism courses. Robert Redford and Dustin Hoffman were cast as the Washington Post’s investigative team of Robert Woodward and Carl Bernstein, who uncover the details of the Watergate scandal that leads to the resignation of President Richard Nixon.

Network

(1976, Metro-Goldwyn-Mayer, 121 minutes)

In this satire, veteran news anchorman Howard Beale, played by Peter Finch, threatens to shoot himself on live television but instead launches into an angry televised rant, which turns out to be a huge ratings boost for the UBS network. Actress Faye Dunaway starred as the producer who exploits the former anchor's outburst to develop even more outrageous programming.

1980s

Absence of Malice

(1981, Columbia, 116 minutes)

Malice is one of the requirements that individuals in positions of authority must prove to fight libel. The movie sometimes is used in journalism classes to illustrate the conflict between disclosing damaging personal information and the public's right to know. This legal drama from director Sydney Pollack stars Sally Field as Megan, an ambitious newspaper reporter who, based on false information from an FBI investigator, writes a story that implicates Gallagher, a business-owner played by Paul Newman, in the disappearance of a labor leader. Gallagher and Megan then work together to prove his innocence. Both also become lovers. However, Gallagher eventually causes Megan to lose her newspaper job.

Broadcast News

(1987, 20th Century Fox, 133 minutes)

The film – written, produced and directed by James L. Brooks—centers around three characters: a competitive television news producer played by Holly Hunter, who experiences frequent emotional breakdowns; a top-notch reporter played by Albert Brooks; and a charismatic but less seasoned reporter who later becomes a news anchor, played by William Hurt.

1990s

The Paper

(1994, Universal, 112 minutes)

This film, directed by Ron Howard and featuring several well-known actors and actresses, seeks to illustrate newsroom busyness. Henry Hackett, played by Michael Keaton, is the editor of a New York City tabloid. He is a workaholic who loves his job, but the long hours and low pay are leading to discontent. Robert Duvall also stars as publisher Bernie White, who faces financial straits and has his managing editor to impose unpopular cutbacks. Henry's wife Martha, a pregnant former reporter of his, is upset because he spends little time with his family. Hackett considers an offer from a competing paper to serve as editor, a position that would bring more money, shorter hours and greater esteem. In the middle of these situations, however, Hackett works to break a big story.

2000s

Anchorman: The Legend of Ron Burgundy

(2004, DreamWorks Pictures, 95 minutes)

A sarcastic perception on the 1970s male-dominated culture of television news broadcasting, especially with its focus on action news reporting, the film stars comedy actor Will Ferrell as Ron Burgundy, San Diego's top TV news anchor. However, Burgundy faces competition when an ambitious woman is hired as a news anchor. A follow-up to the movie, “Anchorman 2: The Legend Continues,” was released in 2013.

2010s

Spotlight

(2015, Open Road Films, 128 minutes)

Directed by Tom McCarthy, the film won two Academy Awards for Best Picture and Best Original Screenplay. With a cast that includes Michael Keaton, Mark Ruffalo and Rachel McAdams, the movie tells the true story of how The Boston Globe’s Spotlight team, a small group of journalists who write investigative news articles that require months to research and publish, uncovered the massive scandal of child molestation and cover-up within the Boston Catholic Archdiocese, shaking the entire denomination of Catholicism across the world. The film is considered the “most straightforward journalism procedural” since “All the President’s Men.”

Truth

(2015, Sony Pictures Classics, 125 minutes)

Based on American journalist and television news producer Mary Mapes’ memoir Truth and Duty: The Press, the President and the Privilege of Power, the film details the 2004 CBS “60 Minutes” report that investigated then-President George W. Bush’s military service in the National Guard when he was a young man. However, a day after the broadcast, criticism surfaced on the authenticity of the documents that Mapes and her team used to corroborate the interviews in the story. The controversy cost news anchor Dan Rather and Mapes their careers at CBS News. Cate Blanchett portrays Mapes, and Robert Redford stars as Rather.

10 Days in a Madhouse

(2015, Tri-Coast Worldwide Café Pictures, 111 minutes)

Based on journalist Nellie Bly’s exposition, “Ten Days in a Mad-House,” which led to significant reforms in the treatment of mental health patients in the late 1880s, this biographical film, written and directed by Timothy Hines, follows Bly’s account of her undercover experiences. As a reporter working for Joseph Pulitzer in 1887, she went undercover by committing herself to Blackwell’s Island Asylum, an insane asylum for women, to expose abuse.

The Post

(2017, 20th Century Fox, 116 minutes)

The New York Times was the first newspaper to publish the Pentagon Papers, which documented classified information pertaining to the U.S. involvement in the Vietnam War. The U.S. attorney-general issued an injunction mandating that the paper cease publication of further information. However, The Washington Post published a secondary set of classified documents that were leaked and joined the battle to preserve the First Amendment and the public’s right to know.

A Private War

(2018, Aviron Pictures, 110 minutes)

Biographical war drama regarding The Sunday Times journalist Marie Colvin (Rosamund Pike) visiting the most dangerous countries and documenting their civil wars.

Bombshell

(2019, Lionsgate, 109 minutes)

Based upon the accounts of the women at Fox News who set out to expose CEO Roger Ailes for sexual harassment.

2020s

She Said

(2022, Universal Pictures, 129 minutes)

Based on the 2019 book by New York Times reporters Jodi Kantor and Megan Twohey following their investigation that exposed Harvey Weinstein's history of abuse and sexual misconduct against women.

== Television shows ==
Television programs, mostly comedy shows, also incorporate journalism themes and attributes into the plot. One of the earliest and most popular TV sitcoms to highlight journalism is The Mary Tyler Moore Show, which aired on CBS from 1970-1977. The show centered around Mary Richards, played by Mary Tyler Moore, who moved to Minneapolis after a breakup with her fiancee and got a job as an associate producer at a TV station, WJM-TV. She befriends her tough but lovable boss Lou Grant, a role played by Ed Asner. Mary later becomes producer at the station.

After The Mary Tyler Moore Show ended, the show's creators, James L. Brooks and Allan Burns, along with Gene Reynolds, wrote a spin-off titled “Lou Grant” from 1977-1982. The show, starring Ed Asner in the title role as a newspaper editor, followed the trials of Grant and his newspaper staff.

CBS aired another comedy television show that prominently focused on journalism called Murphy Brown, which ran from 1988-1998. Actress Candice Bergen played the title role of Murphy Brown, a famous investigative television journalist for “FYI,” a fictional CBS television newsmagazine. The program was well known for stories inspired by current events and its political satire. During the 1992 presidential campaign, Murphy Brown achieved a high level of cultural notoriety when Republican vice presidential candidate Dan Quayle criticized the show in a campaign speech, often referred to as the "Murphy Brown speech".

From 1995-1999, NBC aired NewsRadio, a comedy sitcom that relied on sarcasm among the staffers at WNYX, the fictional No. 2 news radio station serving New York.
