= Fabe (rapper) =

French rapper (born 1971)

- Born: Fabrice Leloup; 1971 (age 54–55); Paris, France
- Origin: Barbès, Paris, France
- Genres: French hip hop, Conscious rap
- Occupation: Rapper
- Years active: 1991–2000
- Label: Independent

Fabrice "Fabe" (born in 1971, Paris, France) is a French rapper from Barbès, a district of Paris. He is one of the founders of Scred Connexion, an underground French rap group.

== Career ==
He started rapping around 1991 releasing his first work as early as 1995. He is mostly known for his thought-provoking and clever use of lyrics. During the French Riots, he was cited in a petition against seven rap musicians and bands, who were alleged to have incited racism and the riots themselves. The claims were dropped shortly afterwards. He retired from the music scene in 2000 and left to study theology in Quebec.

== Discography ==
=== Albums ===
- 1995 : Befa surprend ses frères
- 1997 : Le fond et la forme
- 1998 : Détournement de son
- 2000 : La rage de dire

=== EP ===
- 1996 : Lentement mais sûrement

=== Maxis ===
- 1994 : Je n'aime pas
- 1994 : Chaque fois avec Idéosoul & Sléo
- 1995 : Ça fait partie de mon passé
- 1996 : Fais-moi du vent
- 1996 : Lettre au président
- 1997 : Mal partis (Cut killer feat. Fabe, K-reen, Koma)
- 1997 : Des durs, des boss... des dombis
- 1998 : Code noir - Crime contre l'Humanité
