= Scred Connexion =

French rap collective

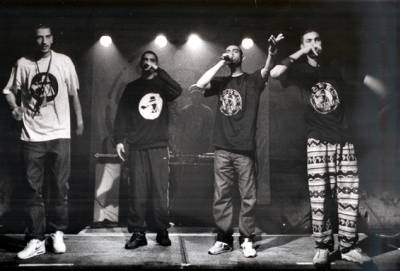
- Scred in 2007

Background information
- Origin: France
- Genres: French hip hop
- Years active: 1990s–present
- Members: Haroun; Koma; Mokless
- Past members: Fabe; Morad (deceased)
- Website: www.scredconnexion.com

Scred Connexion is a French rap collective launched in the 1990s composed by Fabe, Koma, Haroun, Mokless and Morad, with the assistance of Butch. Fabe decided to quit his rapping career in 2000 and quit the collective after releasing one additional solo album.

"Scred" originates from a track by collective member Koma in his first maxi Époque de fous and is verlan for discret (meaning discreet). The collective released six musical projects with each member keeping his independence and solo projects they worked on concurrently. The collective addressed many issues in French society becoming a militant band for social justice and change distinguishing itself with quality of text and being critical of superficial rappers and favoring more fundamental content, promoting the slogan "Jamais dans la tendance mais toujours dans la bonne direction", after a member of the formation, Fabe, launched it in his piece "Impertinent".

The song Monnaie Monnaie is part of the Carbone's movie soundtrack in 2017.

On November 19, 2023 it was announced that Morad died of heart attack.

== Discography: Scred Connexion ==
Year	Album	Peak positions
Year	Album	FRA
2000	Scred Selexion 99/2000	–
2001	Du mal à s'confier	110
2002	Scred Selexion Vol. 2	–
2005	Scred Selexion vol. 3 Spécial Mokless	184
2008	Indomptés (Maxi)	101
2009	Ni vu...ni connu	33
2009	Barbès All Star (Compilation album)	–
2009	Classico	–

== Solo careers of members of the collective ==
=== Fabe ===
Fabe (born in 1971 Paris, France) is a French rapper from Barbès, a neighborhood of Paris. He was one of the most established of the members who already had a long list of releases. Fabe decided to quit his rapping career in 2000 and left the collective.

Solo discography

- 1994: Je n'aime pas
- 1994: Befa surprend ses frères
- 1996: Lentement mais sûrement
- 1996: Fais-moi du vent
- 1996: Le fond et la forme
- 1998: Détournement de son (FR: #33)
- 2000: La rage de dire (FR: #59)

He also had a charting single "Ça fait partie de mon passé" that reached #45 in France.

=== Haroun ===
Solo discography

- 2007: Sur scène (Maxi)
- 2007: Au front
- 2008: Le zonard (Maxi)

=== Koma ===
Koma is a rapper of Algerian origin from the 18th arrondissement of Paris. He grew up in Barbès.

Solo discography

- 1997: Tout est calculé
- 1999: Le réveil

=== Mokless ===
Mokless (born in 1977) is a rapper of Tunisian origin from the 18th arrondissement; he too grew up in Barbès. He started MCing in 1996 before joining Scred Connexion.

In 2012, Mokless got involved in a musical project with Guizmo and rapper Congolese-French Despo Rutti from that has resulted in the issue of the joint EP Jamais 2 sans 3 followed by the joint studio album Jamais 203. The three acts are touring France in promotion of the releases.

Solo discography

- 2006: Coup de Maître
- 2011: Le poids des mots (FR: #45)

Discography as part of trio Guizmo, Despo Rutti & Mokless

- 2013: Jamais 2 sans 3 (EP before the album)
- 2013: Jamais 203

=== Morad ===
Morad (born in 1977, died in 2023), a French rapper of Algerian origin, is signed with Only Music.

Solo discography

- 2010: Le bon vieux son
- 2012: Le survivant
