= El Nuevo Cojo =

El Nuevo Cojo Ilustrado

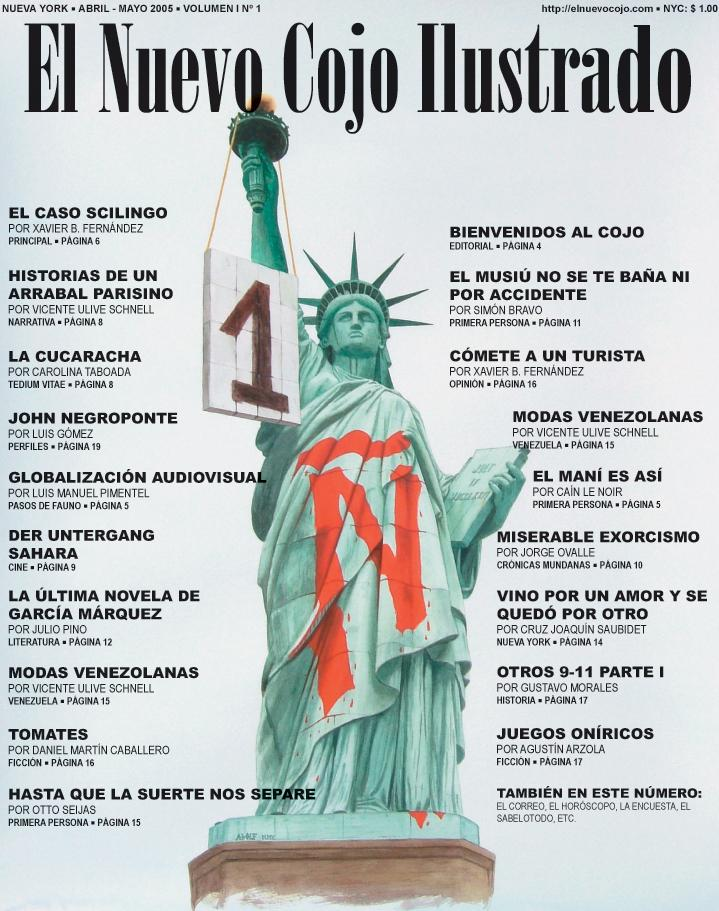
- The cover of the April 19, 2005 issue of El Nuevo Cojo Ilustrado, the first print issue of the magazine
- Editor: Gordon Milcham
- Categories: News magazine
- Frequency: Monthly
- First issue: April 19, 2003
- Final issue: October 19, 2005 (print)
- Company: El Nuevo Cojo Media
- Country: United States
- Based in: New York, New York
- Language: Spanish
- Website: www.elnuevocojo.com

El Nuevo Cojo Ilustrado is an American online Spanish language magazine published from Los Angeles, California. It was founded in 2003 as a free alternative webzine published monthly from Harlem, New York. Originally it was an arts and opinion magazine focused exclusively on Venezuelan culture for Venezuelans living in the United States. It also sought to be a window to the US press for Spanish-speaking immigrants by translating English articles from mainstream newspapers. The website slowly embraced a wider audience by covering general interest issues.

The name of the magazine was inspired by El Cojo Ilustrado, an influential Venezuelan magazine published in Caracas between 1892 and 1915.

The site went online on April 19, 2003, and a print edition was announced in August 2004. In April 2005 El Nuevo Cojo started publishing a printed monthly tabloid in New York City, focusing on local and international events and highly politicized opinion articles in line with a gradual shift towards a more left-leaning and liberal editorial point of view. However, over time, the satirical articles and sections like fake horoscopes, polls, movie reviews and obituaries have demonstrated to be El Nuevo Cojo Ilustrado's real trademark.

Until December 2005 the website was updated monthly, but starting in January 2006, El Nuevo Cojo Ilustrado moved into a model of constant updating after the discontinuation of the print edition in October 2005.

El Nuevo Cojo Ilustrado's music section is integrated to a radio streaming service called Lobotoradio. The service transmits a 24-hour stream of Hispanic and English pop/rock in support of music reviews and articles.

El Nuevo Cojo was founded by Gordon Milcham, a Venezuelan lawyer and then New York resident, who frequently contributes history and opinion articles. The staff consists of an international group of Hispanic writers and journalists from Europe, Latin America and the United States. Freelance writers are frequent contributors, given El Nuevo Cojo's policy of promoting the art of writing for non-journalists. In its first year, 80% of El Nuevo Cojo's articles were written by freelancers, mostly readers. Today freelancers' contributions make only about 10% of the magazine's output. The change, rather than from diminishing readership, was due to the development of a strong team of columnists and contributors.

El Nuevo Cojo first gained notoriety among Venezuelan readers by its strong criticism to the failed coup d'etat that sought the deposing of President Hugo Chávez in Venezuela and later against the 2004 recall referendum, when the wide majority of Venezuelan media outlets opposed the president. Attacks against opposition journalists and politicians were frequent and opened the door to articles about local racism, classism and values in Venezuelan society. This position gained the webzine a "Chavista" reputation that it hasn't been able to clean up. Far from being "Chavista" (El Nuevo Cojo Ilustrado has published articles criticizing Chávez' politics on several occasions), its ideological stance about Venezuelan affairs was motivated by its liberal and anti-Bush, anti-War in Iraq point of view.

El Nuevo Cojo Ilustrado's staff has changed a lot since its launching, but frequent contributors include Spanish writer Xavier B. Fernández (Barcelona), Venezuelan writer Vicente Ulive-Schnell (Paris) and Argentine writer Cruz Joaquin Saubidet (New York). The printed edition of El Nuevo Cojo Ilustrado was highlighted by high-concept illustrations by Catalan artist ADOLF.
