= Zoxea =

- Born: Jean-Jacques Kodjo; 1974 (age 51–52); Sèvres, Hauts-de-Seine, France
- Origin: Boulogne-Billancourt, France
- Genres: French Rap
- Years active: 1993–present
- Label: KDBZik

Jean-Jacques Kodjo (French pronunciation: [ʒɑ̃ ʒak kodʒo]; born November 11, 1974), known as Zoxea (/zɒksi/), is a French rapper. He was brought up in the Castéja Project of Boulogne-Billancourt, Hauts-de-Seine.

== Career ==
He is one of the three members of Les Sages Poètes de la Rue (The Wise Poets of the Street) with his brother Melopheelo and Dany Dan. They made their first apparition on the hip-hop scene in 1993 on the Cool Sessions compilation and on the original soundtrack of the classic La Haine with on Baiser du Poste (With love from the Police station).

Les Sages Poètes de la Rue released their first album Qu’est ce qui fait marcher les Sages (What makes the wise guys walk) in 1995. Far from the hardcore trend, Zoxea and his mates prefer an old-school approach on jazzy vibes.

With the success of this first album, Zoxea and Les Sages Po’ form their own structure: Beat de Boul, in order to help the groups of their area to make it into the hip hop industry. Amongst these groups are the famous Lunatic, Malekal Morte, Movez’ Lang and Less du Neuf. Beat de Boul releases Dans la Sono (In the Soundsystem) in 1997 and les Sages Po’ come back the following year 1998 with their second album Jusqu’à l’Amour (Till Love) and are acclaimed by both their public and the media.

Zoxea takes advantage of this success to launch his solo career. He collaborates with Busta Flex on his eponymous album where he produces the hit J’fais mon job à plein temps (I do my job full-time), and he takes part to the Freestyle Sessions with NTM (Joey Starr and Kool Shen). He also supports them on stage during the national tour 93 Party and produces On est encore là (We’re still there) a track on their eponymous album. Finally he creates the crew IV My People with Kool Shen and Busta Flex.

In February 1999, Zoxea releases his first album solo : À mon tour d’briller (It's my turn to shine). The album goes gold by the end of the same year and show the talent of Zoxea as a solo artist with great featuring such as Beat de Boul, Don Choa, Lord Kossity, Melopheelo and Kool Shen.

In 2000, Zoxea takes part to the second episode of Beat de Boul: Dans la Ville (In the City), with Melopheelo and Dany Dan but also Movez’ Lang, Nysay and Sir Doum's.

Les Sages Poètes de la Rue make it back to the studio in 2002 for their third album Après l’Orage (After the Storm).

In 2003, Zoxea and his brother Melopheelo form their own label: KDBZik, to preserve their independent spirit. In 2004, they release Zoxea's second album solo: Dans la Lumière (In the Light). The same year, Zoxea realises the hit Un Ange dans le Ciel (An Angel in the Sky) and appears on two tracks of Dernier Round (Last Round) the solo album of Kool Shen.

The following year sees the release of the fourth album of Les Sages Poètes de la Rue: Trésors Enfouis (Hidden Treasures). The public still loyal to the band welcomes this album “concept”.

In 2006, Zoxea appears in featuring with the R&B phenomenon M. Pokora on l’Enfer du Samedi Soir (Saturday Night Hell). The following year, Zoxea comes back with Beat de Boul and its third episode: Dans un Autre Monde (In Another World).

Zoxea has been an artist resident at the CENTQUATRE, a Parisian place of artistic creation, from February to October 2009 to work on his third solo album http://www.104.fr/#en/Artists/A120-Zoxea.

Zoxea is also planning to go back to the recording studio with Les Sages Poètes de la Rue to work on their fifth album, which will be another occasion to bring their peaceful and jazzy touch to the hip-hop.

== Discography ==
- 1995 : Qu'est ce qui fait marcher les Sages (Les Sages Poètes de la Rue)
- 1997 : Dans la Sono (Beat de Boul)
- 1998 : Jusqu'à l'Amour (Les Sages Poètes de la Rue)
- 1999 : A mon tour d'briller (Zoxea)
- 2000 : Dans la Ville (Beat de Boul) & Certifié Conforme (IV My People)
- 2002 : Après l'Orage (Les Sages Poètes de la Rue) & IV My People Zone (IV My People)
- 2004 : Dans la Lumière (Zoxea)
- 2005 : Trésors Enfouis (Les Sages Poètes de la Rue)
- 2006 : Dans un Autre Monde (Beat de Boul)
- 2008 : Trésors Enfouis Volume 2 (Les Sages Poètes de la Rue)
