= Misunderstood =

Misunderstood may refer to:

== Music ==
- The Misunderstood, a 1960s psychedelic rock band originating from Riverside, California
- "Misunderstood" (Bon Jovi song)
- "Misunderstood" (Mötley Crüe song)
- "Misunderstood" (Robbie Williams song)
- "Misunderstood" (Savuto Vakadewavosa song)
- "Misunderstood" (Youngn Lipz song) (2019)
- "Misunderstood" (Forrest Frank and Cory Asbury song) (2025)
- "Misunderstood", a song by Dream Theater from the album Six Degrees of Inner Turbulence
- "Misunderstood", a song from Pete Townshend and Ronnie Lane's album Rough Mix
- "Misunderstood", a song by Wilco from the album Being There
- "Misunderstood", a song by Kendrick Lamar from the mixtape C4
- Misunderstood, an album by Yung Bans
- Missunderstood (Queen Naija album), 2020
- Misunderstood (mixtape), a mixtape by JayDaYoungan
- (Miss)understood, an album by Ayumi Hamasaki
- Missundaztood, an album by Pink
- Misunderstood (group)

== Other media ==
- Misunderstood (1966 film), an Italian film
- Misunderstood (1984 film), an American film starring Henry Thomas
- Misunderstood (2014 film), an Italian film
- "Misunderstood" (short story), a story by P. G. Wodehouse included in The Uncollected Wodehouse

== See also ==
- Misunderstand (disambiguation)
- Misunderstanding (disambiguation)
