= Who I Smoke =

Single by Yungeen Ace, Spinabenz, and FastMoney Goon featuring Whoppa Wit Da Choppa

from the album Life of Betrayal 2x
- Released: April 16, 2021
- Genre: Southern hip-hop; gangsta rap; drill
- Length: 2:14
- Label: Cinematic
- Songwriters: Bryant McDuffle; Dasani Wright; Keyanta Bullard; Noah R. Williams; Reginald L. Williams; Vanessa Carlton
- Producer: Drilltime

Yungeen Ace singles chronology
"Opp Boyz" (2021)	"Who I Smoke" (2021)	"Back Like I Neva Left" (2021)

Spinabenz singles chronology
"Drill Time" (2021)	"Who I Smoke" (2021)	"First Week Out" (2021)

FastMoney Goon singles chronology
"Vanish Mode" (2021)	"Who I Smoke" (2021)	"Late Night Vibes" (2021)

Whoppa Wit Da Choppa singles chronology
"Vanish Mode" (2021)	"Who I Smoke" (2021)	"Take Off" (2021)

Music video
- "Who I Smoke" on YouTube

"Who I Smoke" is a song by American rappers Yungeen Ace, Spinabenz, and FastMoney Goon featuring Whoppa Wit Da Choppa. Released as a single on April 16, 2021, "Who I Smoke" samples Vanessa Carlton's "A Thousand Miles" and serves as a diss track against multiple deceased people who are specifically named and disrespected in the song. "Who I Smoke" performed successfully for the featured rappers, going viral throughout social media and on music platforms following its release. "Who I Smoke" was described by HipHopCanada as having exemplified "Jacksonville's deadly KTA vs. ATK war"; the rappers featured are associated with ATK, which sources have described it standing for "Ace's Top Killers", "Ace to Kill", or "Aim to Kill". Many of the individuals named in the song were friends with Julio Foolio, another rapper who, prior to his death, were rivals against the creators of "Who I Smoke".

Lyrics from the song were later used by prosecutors against Spinabenz (Noah Williams) in 2022 as alleged evidence on a charge of possession of a firearm by a convicted felon, though Williams was acquitted on the case.

== Music video ==
"Who I Smoke" was initially released as a music video on YouTube. Directed by TeoShotThis, it features the artists in a golf course wearing polo shirts and khakis, partying, smoking cigars, and "hurling threats at their opps". The music video, described by HotNewHipHop as being edited in "comical" fashion, also features the artists "smoking on" various deceased rival gang members, including "Bibby", "Teki", and "Lil Nine".

== Reception ==
Eric Wells of Complex characterized "Who I Smoke" as being one of multiple which contained "wildly disrespectful lyrics," though adding that "beyond all the shock value is an undeniably talented new era of rappers, who are all drawing attention to themselves in their own ways". Alex Zidel of HotNewHipHop described the song as being "one of the most disrespectful songs of the entire year, and quite possibly one of the most hilarious diss tracks of the last decade".

The rappers behind "Who I Smoke" received criticism due to its sampling of Vanessa Carlton's "A Thousand Miles", after which Carlton responded with a statement reading: "To the white folks that have expressed anger/shock over my approval of A Thousand Miles’ usage in the Spinabenz, Whoppa Wit Da Choppa, Yungeen Ace, & FastMoney Goon song Who I Smoke, I invite you to ask yourself why you feel this way & then read this." Along with her statement, Carlton attached the McNair Scholars Research Journal article Share Cropping Blackness: White Supremacy and the Hyper-Consumption of Black Popular Culture.

== Certifications ==
Region	Certification	Certified units/sales
United States (RIAA)	Gold	500,000^{‡}
^{‡} Sales+streaming figures based on certification alone.
