= Spinabenz =

American rapper and singer (born 1998)

- Born: Noah Rayquan Williams; September 14, 1998 (age 28); Jacksonville, Florida, U.S.
- Genres: Southern hip-hop; trap; gangsta rap; mumble rap; southern hip hop
- Occupations: Rapper; singer; songwriter
- Years active: 2016—present

Noah Rayquan Williams (September 14, 1998), known professionally as Spinabenz, is an American rapper and singer from Jacksonville, Florida. He is best known for his 2021 viral hit "Who I Smoke" (with Yungeen Ace and FastMoney Goon featuring Whoppa Wit Da Choppa), which samples Vanessa Carlton's "A Thousand Miles".

== Career ==
=== Early career ===
On 1 March 2019, Williams released his first album, "King Leonidas", featuring DJ Shab on his song "Blue Hundreds".

On 13 November 2020, Williams released a collaborative album with Whoppa Wit Da Choppa named, "KU Lyfe"

=== Who I Smoke ===
On 28 March 2021, Williams released "Who I Smoke" on his YouTube channel, the song collaborated with Yungeen Ace, FastMoney Goon, and Whoppa Wit Da Choppa as a feature. "Who I Smoke" sampled Vanessa Carlton's "A Thousand Miles" and serves as a diss track against multiple deceased people who are specifically named and disrespected in the song. "Who I Smoke" was described by HipHopCanada as having exemplified "Jacksonville's deadly KTA vs. ATK war"; the rappers featured are associated with ATK. The rappers were later criticized for the sample and Vanessa Carlton defended them and stated that there was nothing wrong.

=== 2022-present ===
On 8 April 2022, Williams released his studio album "The Tornado Kidd", he later released the deluxe.

== Legal issues ==
Williams was convicted of witness tampering and carrying a concealed firearm in separate cases 2017.

Williams was arrested in 2021 for possession of a firearm by a convicted felon but was released on bond.

On August 29, 2022, Williams was arrested on charges of criminal mischief and tampering with an electronic monitoring device. The police did not know where he was for 52 minutes. Williams told police that he was out of the house on August 29, during the time he was unaccounted for. Williams was being held on a $450,000 bond. On September 8, 2022, the trial was scheduled after a judge agreed to postpone the case at the request of prosecutors. Prosecutors wanted to introduce both his rap videos and his social media presence to build a timeline of events they say will prove that a gun police found in a car with him was actually his weapon. Williams could have faced up to 15 years in prison, If convicted on the gun charges, there would be a separate decision to determine if his sentence will be enhanced due to alleged gang ties. On October 21, 2022, Williams was found not guilty and avoided up to a 30-year sentence.

On 24 May 2023, Williams pleaded guilty to tampering charges and prosecutors are seeking 12 months in prison, while his attorneys are asking that sentenced to time served, meaning he would be free to go home.

On 2 June 2023, Williams was sentenced to 6 months (with credit for 52 days previously served) in jail for tampering with his ankle monitor.

On 2 June 2023, Williams said he was beaten up by a guard in Duval County jail. Williams said, "I was beaten in Duval County PTDF yesterday unwarranted & unprovoked by JSO Sargent Riviera. Force was so excessive I had to be taken to the hospital. X-rays and MRI revealed I have both neck and back injuries. I am in a neck brace as a result of my injuries. They placed me in administrative confinement and turned off my access to tablets so no one can see me"

== Personal life ==
In an Interview with DJ Smallz Eyes, Williams stated that he is biological brothers with rapper Whoppa Wit Da Choppa.
