= Fiji Performing Rights Association =

Music licensing organization

The Fiji Performing Rights Association (FIPRA) is a Collective Management Organization (CMO) for Copyright in Music. representing South Pacific composers, lyricists and music publishers. The association's head office is located in Suva, Fiji, it is the largest performing rights association in the south pacific and works closely with the Australasian Performing Right Association, with which FIPRA has a Reciprocal Agreement.

== History ==
In 1993, FIPRA was established in Fiji, Under a licence agreement with Australasian Performing Right Association.

== FIPRA Music Awards ==
Every year in the mid, FIPRA host its own music awards to honour achievements by Fijian songwriters, composers and artists.

=== 2014 FIPRA Music Awards ===
Category	Winner	Nominees
Best Composition	Elena Baravilala for Fire	Savuto Vakadewavosa for Isa My Viti
Best Music Video	Elena Baravilala for Fire	Savuto Vakadewavosa for Isa My Viti
Best New Artist	Kula Kei Uluivuya	
Most Popular Song	Kula Kei Uluivuya for Tagimoucia	
Best Itaukei Song		Savuto Vakadewavosa for Isa My Viti; Kitione Vunisasari for Sa Mai Yalani Tu; Etonia Lote Jnr for Na Kavoro Oqo; Kula Kei Uluivuya for Tagimoucia; Kerry Damudamu for Qai A I Muri Qore
Best English Song		Savuto Vakadewavosa for Giving Life; Ilisavani Cava for You and Me; Elena Baravilala for Here With You; Peni Morrison for Living In Paradise

=== 2015 FIPRA Music Awards ===
- Best Gospel Song: Nikotimo, Artist: Divine Signature Gospel, Composer: Sainitiki Sinumila
- Best New Artist: Seni Dawa ni Delai Dokidoki
- Best Music Video: Vly: Mositi Au
- Most Outstanding Song: Artist: Knox, Composer: Inoke Kalounisiga for the song: “Coming Home”
- Best Recording Engineer: Ravesi Leweniqila for “Na Dodomo e Mataboko”, Artist: Waisale Qilatabu
- Most Popular Song: Track: “Rarawa ni Yalo Oqo”, Artist: Via ni Tebara Serenaders
- Best Hindi Song: “Van Ko Chali Man Janki” Artist: Avinesh Chand, Composer: Avinesh Chand
- Best iTaukei Song: Savuto Vakadewavosa (ft. DJ Ritendra) for Curu Mai
- Best English Song: Coming Home, Artist: Knox
- International Achievement Award: Knox
- Outstanding Service to Fijian Music: Tui Ravai
- Best Composition: Knox for “Coming Home”
- Hall of Fame: 5 Inductees
  - Rev W. E Bennet of the Methodist Church of Fiji, Artist Deceased, Received by the Methodist Church
  - Ro Cavaisiga Raicebe, Artist Deceased, Prize received by Mrs Raicebe
  - Jolame Rokodrega, Artist Deceased, Prize received by Daughter
  - Mr Satvik Dass, Prize received by son
  - Mr Amena Wainibu, Artist Deceased, Prize received by Mrs Wainibu

=== 2016 FIPRA Music Awards ===
Category	Winner	Nominees
Best New Artist	Rako Pasefika	Naseda; Inside Out
Best Composition	Hanua Helava of Roko Pasefika	“You Got You” By Elena Baravilala “Na veikilai lekaleka mosimosi” By Nasio Domoni
Best English Song	Mama Earth by Rako Pasefika	“You Got You” By Elena Baravilala “Sweet Talking” By Inside Out
International Achievement Award	Rako Pasefika	
Best Gospel Song	Faith Harvest Worship for the song Jisu sa Voleka Maip	“Longing” By Dawn Gospel “Noqu Kalou Au Tagi vei Kemuni” By Saimone Vuatalevu
Most Popular Music Video	Kula Kei Uluivuya for Noqu Senikau	“Ena Bogi” By Savuto Vakadewavosa; Sai Kemuni” By One 2 Eight “Shes not crying anymore” By Naseda “Noqu Daulomani” By Naseda
Most Popular Song	Inside Out for the song Sweet Talking	“Noqu Senikau” By Kula Kei Uluivuya “Nasi Dredre Ga” By Voqa kei Valenisau “Na veikilai lekaleka mosimosi” By Nasio Domoni “Au mai vakila” By Voqa ni delai dokidoki
Best Hindi Song	Kahawa Gaile Saawra by Praneel Sami Don	“Manav Samhje Na Raasta” By Praneel Sami Don “Mere Khuda Meri Dohai Sun” By Saimone Vuatalevu
Best i‑Taukei Song	Nasio Domoni for Na Veikilai Lekaleka Mosimosi	"Au kerekere Viti” By LITE “Sai Kemuni” by One 2 Eight
Best Hip Hop Song	Sekove Qiolevu, Laisiasa Dave Lavaki and Faga Timote for the song Stir it Up	“Money in the Bag” By Kurt Ram “Runnin” by Laisiasa Dave Lavaki
Artist of the Year	Voqa Ni Delai Dokidoki	Nasio Domoni; Savuto Vakadewavosa
Outstanding service to Fijian music	Etonia Lote	

=== 2017 FIPRA Music Awards ===
Category	Winner	Nominees
Best iTaukei Song	Senikakala by Nasio Domoni	KO ROSI NI UTOQU by LEBA BOI YAWE E LOMAI NASAU; ROSI NI WAISILIVA by Malumu ni Tobu kei Naivaukura
Best Composition	Senikakala by Nasio Domoni	ROSI NI WAISILIVA by Malumu ni Tobu kei Naivaukura; I'M FROM THE WEST COAST by TEAM STAY FOCUSSED
Best English Song	I'm From The West Coast by Team Stay Focused	PAUTA by DRIXSTAR; COMING HOME by NEM & TALEI
Best Hip Hop Song	I'm From The West Coast by Team Stay Focused	PAUTA by DRIXSTAR; RUN IT UP by Artist WILO (Featuring TROPIC THUNDA)
Best Recording Engineer	Adriu Saranuku	
Most Popular Music Video	Sau Tiko Viti by Drixstar (feat. Tropic Thunda)	HOME by Elena Baravilala (Featuring DJ Ritendra); VASITI REKISA by Kula Kei Uluivuya; MY LOVE FOR YOU by CAKAU KEI LOMAI (Featuring YOUNG DAVIE & Kula Kei Uluivuya); COMING HOME by NEM & TALEI
Most Popular Song	Ko Rosi ni Utoqu by Leba Boi Yawa e Lomai Nasau	SULU TAVOI E CAGINA YAWA by SIMI ROVA; COMING HOME by NEM & TALEI; SENIKAKALA by NASIO DOMONI; ROSI NI WAISILIVA by Malumu ni Tobu kei Naivaukura
Guitarist of the Year	Manueli Laqeretabua Railoa	
Best Hindi Song	Ma Jhule Ma Jhule by Praneel Sami Don	PUKAR by HONEY HASAN; KAAHE KO AAYO MERE DESH by Praneel Sami Don
Best Gospel Song	Holy, Savasava by CMFI Zone 21	NOQU KALOU by SULIASI TUILAWALAWA; MAROROI AU by EXTOL GOSPEL
International Achievement	Saimoni Vuatalevu	
Hall of Fame	Neumi Kalou (Deceased)	
Best New Artist	Senilagakali kei Koroilagi	DRIXSTAR; SULIASI ULUILAKEBA
Outstanding Service to Fijian Music	Nem and Talei	
Artist of the Year	Leba Boi Yawa e Lomai Nasau	NEM & TALEI; Kula Kei Uluivuya

=== 2018 FIPRA Music Awards ===
The 2018 FIPRA Music Awards was held on the 12th of May at the Grand Pacific Hotel.

Category	Winner	Nominees
Most Popular Music Video	Savuto Vakadewavosa & DJ Ritendra for MISUNDERSTOOD	COCONUT BUBBLING - Big Wilz; WAWA MADA - Team Stay Focused; COCA COLA GAMES - Sauca Seda; WAQA SA VOCA - Savu Ni Delai Lomai
Most Popular Song	Nasio Domoni for Vaka me Veilaroi.	VUABALE NA DODOMO - Leba Boi Yawa E Lomai Nasau; WAQA SA VOCA - Savu Ni Delai Lomai; KAIVESU NI DODOMO - Leba Boi Yawa E Lomai Nasau; NA MOLI KOULA - Voqa Ni Delai Dokidoki
Artist of the Year	Voqa ni Delai Dokidoki	
Best New Artist	Natalie Raikadroka for When I Sing	
Best Recording Engineer	Freddy Suka	
Best Hip-Hop Song	Drixstar & Tropic Thunda for Flags in the air	
Best Composition	Elena Baravilala & Pauliasi for Seven	Flags in the air - Drixstar
Best English Song	Big Wilz for Coconut Bubbling	Flags in the air - Drixstar
Best Gospel Song	Dokidoki for Yaloqu E Tagica Tu	
Best Hindi Song	Praneel Sami Don for Aye Autaar Dhar	MAA by Honey Hasan
Best Itaukei Song	Voqa ni Delai Dokidoki for Na Moli Koula	
Guitarist of the Year	Terio Phillip Junior	
International Achievement	Daniel Costello	
Outstanding Service to Fijian Music	Iliesa Baravilala	
Hall of Fame	Etoni Lote Senior.	
Best Rapper	Andrew Chung	

== See also ==
- Savuto Vakadewavosa
- Elena Baravilala
- Australasian Performing Right Association - the reciprocal society serving New Zealand and Australia.
- Performing Right Society - the reciprocal society serving the United Kingdom.
