= List of murdered hip-hop musicians =

This is a list of notable rappers and hip-hop musicians murdered since 1987.

Two studies in the mid-2010s concluded that murder was the cause of half of hip-hop musician deaths. The average age of death is between 25–30 years of age. Hip-hop artists have a higher rate of homicide than artists of any other genre of music, ranging from five to 32 times higher.

Some reasons cited for the high homicide rate include impoverished background of many artists, criminal gang activity, drug use, and inadequate pastoral care among artists and record labels. In 2020, XXL wrote that of 77 rapper deaths they examined, more than 40 remain unsolved, including the 1996 murder of Tupac Shakur (since solved) and the 1997 murder of the Notorious B.I.G..

== List ==
Name	Date of death	Age at death	Place of death	Cause of death	Ref.
Scott La Rock	August 27, 1987	25	New York City, New York, U.S.	Shooting	
Paul C	July 17, 1989	24	New York City, New York, U.S.	Shooting	
Danny "D-Boy" Rodriguez	October 6, 1990	22	Dallas, Texas, U.S.	Shooting	
Charizma	December 16, 1993	20	East Palo Alto, California, U.S.	Shooting	
Stretch	November 30, 1995	27	New York City, New York, U.S.	Shooting	
Seagram	July 31, 1996	26	Oakland, California, U.S.	Shooting	
Tupac Shakur	September 13, 1996	25	Las Vegas, Nevada, U.S.	Drive-by shooting	
The Notorious B.I.G.	March 9, 1997	24	Los Angeles, California, U.S.	Drive-by shooting	
Fat Pat	February 3, 1998	27	Houston, Texas, U.S.	Shooting	
Big L	February 15, 1999	24	New York City, New York, U.S.	Drive-by shooting	
DJ Uncle Al	September 10, 2001	32	Miami, Florida, U.S.	Shooting	
Jam Master Jay	October 30, 2002	37	New York City, New York, U.S.	Shooting	
Sabotage	January 24, 2003	29	São Paulo, Brazil	Shooting	
Camoflauge	May 19, 2003	21	Savannah, Georgia, U.S.	Shooting	
Soulja Slim	November 26, 2003	26	New Orleans, Louisiana, U.S.	Shooting	
Mac Dre	November 1, 2004	34	Kansas City, Missouri, U.S.	Shooting	
Papa Touwtjie	June 9, 2005	36	Paramaribo, Suriname	Shooting	
Proof	April 11, 2006	32	Detroit, Michigan, U.S.	Shooting	
Big Hawk	May 1, 2006	36	Houston, Texas, U.S.	Shooting	
Dolla	May 18, 2009	21	Los Angeles, California, U.S.	Shooting	
Speedfreaks	March 26, 2010	37	Niterói, Rio de Janeiro, Brazil	Shooting	
Messy Mya	November 14, 2010	22	New Orleans, Louisiana, U.S.	Shooting	
Magnolia Shorty	December 20, 2010	28	New Orleans, Louisiana, U.S.	Shooting	
Bad News Brown	February 11, 2011	33	Montreal, Quebec, Canada	Unspecified violence	
Adán Zapata	June 1, 2012	21	San Nicolás de los Garza, Mexico	Shooting	
Lil JoJo	September 4, 2012	18	Chicago, Illinois, U.S.	Shooting	
Lil Snupe	June 20, 2013	18	Winnfield, Louisiana, U.S.	Shooting	
MC Daleste	July 7, 2013	20	Paulínia, Brazil	Shooting	
Pavlos Fyssas	September 18, 2013	34	Keratsini, Greece	Stabbing	
Depzman	September 21, 2013	18	Birmingham, England	Stabbing	
The Jacka	February 2, 2015	37	Oakland, California, U.S.	Shooting	
Chinx	May 17, 2015	31	New York City, New York, U.S.	Shooting	
Young Pappy	May 29, 2015	19–20	Chicago, Illinois, U.S.	Shooting	
Bankroll Fresh	March 4, 2016	28	Atlanta, Georgia, U.S.	Shooting	
Mr. 3-2	November 10, 2016	44	Houston, Texas, U.S.	Shooting	
XXXTentacion	June 18, 2018	20	Deerfield Beach, Florida, U.S.	Shooting	
Jimmy Wopo	June 18, 2018	21	Pittsburgh, Pennsylvania, U.S.	Drive-by shooting	
Smoke Dawg	June 30, 2018	21	Toronto, Ontario, Canada	Shooting	
Young Greatness	October 29, 2018	34	New Orleans, Louisiana, U.S.	Shooting	
Feis	January 1, 2019	32	Rotterdam, Netherlands	Shooting	
Kevin Fret	January 10, 2019	24	San Juan, Puerto Rico	Shooting	
Nipsey Hussle	March 31, 2019	33	Los Angeles, California, U.S.	Shooting	
RS	September 3, 2019	18	Amsterdam, Netherlands	Stabbing	
Pop Smoke	February 19, 2020	20	Los Angeles, California, U.S.	Shooting during home invasion	
Houdini	May 26, 2020	21	Toronto, Ontario, Canada	Shooting	
Huey	June 25, 2020	32	Kinloch, Missouri, U.S.	Shooting	
FBG Duck	August 4, 2020	26	Chicago, Illinois, U.S.	Shooting	
King Von	November 6, 2020	26	Atlanta, Georgia, U.S.	Shooting	
MO3	November 11, 2020	28	Dallas, Texas, U.S.	Shooting	
Einár	October 21, 2021	19	Stockholm, Sweden	Shooting	
Young Dolph	November 17, 2021	36	Memphis, Tennessee, U.S.	Shooting	
Drakeo the Ruler	December 19, 2021	28	Los Angeles, California, U.S.	Stabbing	
Snootie Wild	February 27, 2022	36	Houston, Texas, U.S.	Shooting	
Goonew	March 18, 2022	24	Prince George's County, Maryland, U.S.	Shooting	
Archie Eversole	April 5, 2022	37	Decatur, Georgia, U.S.	Shooting	
Sidhu Moose Wala	May 29, 2022	28	Mansa, Punjab, India	Shooting	
Trouble	June 5, 2022	34	Atlanta, Georgia, U.S.	Shooting during home invasion	
Notti Osama	July 9, 2022	14	Manhattan, New York City, U.S.	Stabbing	
JayDaYoungan	July 27, 2022	24	Bogalusa, Louisiana, U.S.	Shooting	
Young Slo-Be	August 5, 2022	29	Manteca, California, U.S.	Shooting	
Pat Stay	September 4, 2022	36	Halifax, Nova Scotia, Canada	Stabbing	
PnB Rock	September 12, 2022	30	Los Angeles, California, U.S.	Shooting	
Takeoff	November 1, 2022	28	Houston, Texas, U.S.	Shooting	
AKA	February 10, 2023	35	Durban, South Africa	Shooting	
Pacho El Antifeka	June 1, 2023	42	Bayamón, Puerto Rico	Shooting	
Bigidagoe	February 25, 2024	26	Amsterdam, Netherlands	Shooting	
C.Gambino	June 4, 2024	26	Gothenburg, Sweden	Shooting	
Julio Foolio	June 23, 2024	26	Tampa, Florida, U.S.	Shooting	
Gaboro	December 19, 2024	23	Norrköping, Sweden	Shooting	
HavinMotion	April 23, 2026	22	Washington, D.C., U.S.	Shooting	
BloodHound Q50	September 13, 2026	22	Chicago, Illinois, U.S.	Shooting	

== See also ==
- List of murdered musicians
- List of deaths in popular music
- List of musicians who died of drug overdose
- 27 Club
- Curse of the ninth
