= Savuto Vakadewavosa =

- Also known as: Savuto
- Born: Savuto Vakadewavosa; 7 July 1987 (age 39); Suva, Fiji
- Origin: Suva, Fiji
- Genres: Pop; RnB; Rock
- Occupations: Singer; Songwriter
- Years active: 2011–present
- Label: Spotlight Entertainment

Savuto Vakadewavosa also known as Fiji's Vude Prince is a Fijian singer-songwriter. He is the co-founder of the record label Spotlight Entertainment and he is well known for his songs "Bulou Noqu I Tau", "Sa I Vagadaci", "Curu Mai", Misunderstood and "Vina Ga O Nadji". At the Fiji Performing Rights Association Music Awards, Fiji's premiere music awards, he has so far won Best Itaukei Song for "Curu Mai" in 2015 and Most Popular Music Video for "Misunderstood" in 2018, A collaboration with DJ Ritendra.

== Personal life ==
Born in Fiji in 1987 as Rusiate Savuto Harold Vakadewavosa, known by his stage name Savuto. He is a son of a Methodist church pastor.

Savuto is related to the Fijian rugby player, Isikeli Vuruna as first cousins.

== Music career ==
His debut single from the forthcoming album, Bulou Noqu I Tau was a popular hit in his home country.

== Collaborations ==
Savuto is very well known for his collaborations with fijian composer DJ Ritendra, there single titled "Misunderstood" was a hit in their home country Fiji and won the Most Popular Music Video award at 2018 Fiji Performing Rights Association Music Awards.

== Discography ==
=== Studio albums ===
- Ra Sa Cariba (2015)
- Ra Sa Cariba: Reloaded (2023)
- Na I Loloma (2023)

=== Singles ===
- Bridge of Hope (2009)
- Bulou Noqu I Tau ft. Sera Fatafehi (2011)
- Isa My Viti ft. Kiti Niumataiwalu (2011)
- Curu Mai (2012)
- Sa I Vagadaci (2012)
- Na Siga Ni Sucu ft. Jasmine Duxbury & Roland Williams (2013)
- Giving Life (2014)
- Make A Change (2014)
- Talei Vei Au with Lesaa & Tua (2015)
- Ra Sa Cariba ft. Laisa Vulakoro (2015)
- E Na Bogi (2015)
- We are Counting On You (2015)
- Gauna Ni Sereki ft. Lesaa (2015)
- Misunderstand with DJ Ritendra (2016)

=== Remixes ===
- Sa I Vagadaci (2014)
- Curu Mai with DJ Ritendra (2015)
- E Na Bogi (Official Remix) with DJ Ritendra (2015)
- Gauna Ni Sereki (Reggaeton Remix with DJ Ritendra & Lesaa (2016)
- Misunderstood (Official Remix) with DJ Ritendra (2016)

=== Music videos ===
- Ra Sa Cariba with Laisa Vulakoro (2015)
- E Na Bogi (2016)
- Misunderstood with DJ Ritendra (2017)

== Awards and nominations ==
=== Fiji Performing Rights Association Music Awards ===
Year	Recipient	Category	Result
2014	Giving Life	Best English Song	Nominated
2014	Isa My Viti	Best Itaukei Song	Nominated
2014	Isa My Viti	Best Music Video	Nominated
2014	Isa My Viti	Best Composition	Nominated
2015	Curu Mai	Best Itaukei Song	Won
2015	Curu Mai	Most Popular Song	Nominated
2015	Make A Change	Best Music Video	Nominated
2016	E Na Bogi	Most Popular Music Video	Nominated
2016		Artist of the Year	Nominated
2018	Misunderstood with DJ Ritendra	Most Popular Music Video	Won

== See also ==
- Fiji Performing Rights Association
- Curu Mai
