= 23 Island =

Single by JayDaYoungan

Single by JayDaYoungan

from the album Misunderstood and Baby23
- Released: August 21, 2019
- Length: 4:03
- Songwriter: Javorius Scott
- Producer: BT Grin

JayDaYoungan singles chronology
"Repo" (2019)	"23 Island" (2019)	"38K" (2020)

Music video
- "23 Island" on YouTube

"23 Island" is a song by American rapper JayDaYoungan. It was released on August 21, 2019 as the second single from his mixtape, Misunderstood (2019). It also appears on his debut studio album Baby23 (2020).

== Composition ==
Aron A. of HotNewHipHop described that in the song, "JaydaYoungan brings his southern melodies to a guitar-based production that has an R&B vibe to it."

== Music video ==
The music video was released on August 20, 2019. It sees JayDaYoungan holding stacks of cash, smoking on a beach and by a pool, and singing to his girlfriend.

== Charts ==
Chart (2020)	Peak position
US Bubbling Under Hot 100	17

== Certifications ==
Region	Certification	Certified units/sales
United States (RIAA)	2× Platinum	2,000,000^{‡}
^{‡} Sales+streaming figures based on certification alone.
