= Vodafone M.I.C =

- Genre: Reality Television
- Created by: Paul Dominiko
- Presented by: Merewalesi Nailatikau (2008), Fenton Lutunatabua (2009–2011), Elena Baravilala (2012–present)
- Country of origin: Fiji
- Original language: English
- No. of seasons: 5

Production
- Executive producer: Paul Dominoko
- Running time: 1 hour
- Production company: Fiji TV

Original release
- Release: December 2008 – present

Vodafone M.I.C (Make It Count) is Fiji's own music reality TV show which is similar to the format of American Idol. The show has had five successful seasons. Its sixth season is set for release next year. The show was created by Paul Dominiko. It is broadcast on Fiji TV and airs Tuesdays and Fridays from 7–8 pm (Fiji time)

== How contestants are chosen ==
The judges and producer travel to places in Fiji (Nadi, Suva, Labasa, Lautoka) where auditions take place. Judges observe the contestants and after auditions narrow hopefuls down. The remaining contestants return for a second audition round, here the top 10 finalists are chosen and go on to compete in the live shows.

== Performance night ==
Performance night happens two nights before the elimination night. This is where the contestants perform for public votes. Voting lines open at 8pm and close midnight(4 hours of voting time).

== Elimination rounds ==
Here the votes have been counted and the elimination takes place at the start of the show. The host reveals the bottom three and then the judges deliver who is eliminated(from voting results). The eliminated contestant then sings their swan song and the remaining contestants then continue the show and perform for more vote.

== Season 1 ==
WINNER
Nasoni Saloma

Runner up
Nina Doton

Rest of the top 10

Elena Baravilala

Judges

Jon Apted, Abigale Young, Igelese Ete

== Season 2 ==
WINNER
Ilisavani Cava

Runners up

Peniette Seru, Sofia

Judges

Jon Apted, Talei Burns, Igelese Ete

== Season 3 ==
WINNER
Matereti Koro

Runners up
Natalie Raikadroka, Pauliasi Koroituicakau

Rest of the top 10

Lanza Coffin, Suliano Waqabaca, Kathlenn Waqa, Paulini Cava, Tupou Veikoso

Judges

Jon Apted, Talei Burns Laisa Vulakoro

== Season 4 ==
Winner
Romulo Leweniqila,

Runners-up
Ana Silivale, Laisa Bulatale, Trent Leger,

Rest of the top 10
Misiko Chute, David Rounds, Viva Dakua, Esther Baleniku, Carlos Powell, Mika,

Judges
Allan Alo, Laisa Vulakoro, Charles Taylor.

== Season 5 ==
Auditions for this year's show started on the 21st of April. The show premiered in May.

Winner
Josefa Lesi

Runners-up
Jordeena Punja, Marilyn Mataiasi, Isaia Waqavou

Top 10

Isaia Waqavou, Marilyn Mataiasi, Pauline Tuidravu, Josefa Lesi, Sereima Banuve, Ren Slatter, Jordeena Punja, Litia Rosi, Mosese Tikoduadua, Pauliasi Cinavou

Judges
Charles Taylor, Igelese Ete, Priscilla Williams
