= Misunderstand =

Misunderstand is for one to understand incorrectly, while thinking one has understood correctly.

It may also refer to the following:

- Misunderstanding (disambiguation), various
- Misunderstood (disambiguation), various
