= Misunderstood (mixtape) =

Mixtape by JayDaYoungan
- Released: October 11, 2019
- Length: 53:14
- Label: Atlantic
- Producer: ATL 8a8y; BT Grin; EJ Grimes; HeartBeatz; IAmTrillfiger; JordanGoCrazy; Key Guapo; KP on the Beat; Mike D Exclusive; MrBlackOnDaTrack; Rich Dolla Kush; T Money Beats; TnTXD; Trillo Beats; Troddi Beatz; VadeBeatz

JayDaYoungan chronology
Can't Speak On It	Misunderstood (2019)	Baby 23 (2020)

Misunderstood is the debut commercial mixtape by American rapper JayDaYoungan. It was released on October 11, 2019 by Atlantic Records. It features guest appearances by rappers YFN Lucci, Boosie Badazz, FG Famous, Jetsoo, and Lil Durk. The album was supported by four singles "Flash Out", "23 Island", "Don't GAF", Broken Promises". The mixtape was best known for his single "23 Island", which received double platinum certification by the Recording Industry Association of America (RIAA). The ninth project from JayDaYoungan, it is one of 10 mixtapes JayDaYoungan released in his lifetime, as he was shot and killed outside of his home in Bogalusa, Louisiana on July 27, 2022.

== Critical reception ==
David Crone of AllMusic wrote that the album "continues the up-and-comer's rapid release streak of street-level rap. Arriving on the back of the tropical-inspired hit '23 Island,' the project features an assortment of styles, from the corner rap of 'Preach' to the crooning trap-ballad 'Missing You.' With features from YFN Lucci, Boosie Badazz, and Lil Durk, Misunderstood spices up JayDaYoungan's tried-and-true style with work from some of his closest contemporaries."

== Track listing ==
Misunderstood track listing
No.	Title	Producer(s)	Length
1.	"Body Bags"	HeartBeatz	3:15
2.	"Preach"	ATL 8a8y; KP on the Beat	2:40
3.	"Broken Promises" (featuring YFN Lucci)	TnTXD; VadeBeatz	3:30
4.	"Crying Out for Help"	Troddi Beatz	2:14
5.	"23 Island"	BT Grin	4:03
6.	"Spray for Me"	KP on the Beat	3:04
7.	"Don't Call Me"	HeartBeatz	2:23
8.	"Flash Out"	Trillo Beats	2:02
9.	"Shooters"	MrBlackOnDaTrack	2:24
10.	"Head Bust" (featuring Boosie Badazz)	MrBlackOnDaTrack; HeartBeatz	2:51
11.	"All on Mine"	T Money Beats; Mike D Exclusive; KP on the Beat	2:52
12.	"Missing You"	MrBlackOnDaTrack; HeartBeatz	3:15
13.	"Survive"	MrBlackOnDaTrack; HeartBeatz	2:37
14.	"Dreadlocks" (featuring FG Famous)	JordanGoCrazy	1:35
15.	"Nobody Safe"	IAmTrillfiger	2:46
16.	"Don't GAF" (featuring JetSoo)	Rich Dolla Kush	3:25
17.	"Love You"	MrBlackOnDaTrack; HeartBeatz	2:03
18.	"Raw"	EJ Grimes	3:14
19.	"Dum Remix" (featuring Lil Durk)	Key Guapo	3:00
Total length:			53:14

== Charts ==
Chart performance for Misunderstood
Chart (2019)	Peak position
US Billboard 200	43
US Top R&B/Hip-Hop Albums (Billboard)	23
