= Malumu ni Tobu kei Naivaukura =

Fijian band

- Origin: Koro Island, Fiji
- Genres: Pop, Sigidrigi & Vude
- Years active: 2008–present
- Label: Procera Music
- Members: Jiosefa Vetaukula; Savenaca Nukucebuya; Laisiasa Koroi; Josaia Vetaukula

Malumu ni Tobu kei Naivaukura also known as Malumu ni Tobu in short is a Fijian music band based in Fiji. Jiosefata Veitaukula is the lead singer. One of its songs, "Rosi Ni Waisiliva", was nominated at the 2017 Fiji Performing Rights Association Music Awards.

== Awards and nominations ==
=== Fiji Performing Rights Association Music Awards ===
Year	Recipient	Category	Result
2017	ROSI NI WAISILIVA	Best iTaukei Song	Nominated
2017	ROSI NI WAISILIVA	Best Composition	Nominated
2017	ROSI NI WAISILIVA	Most Popular Song	Nominated

=== Procera Music Awards ===
Year	Category	Result
2011	Top Artist	Won
2012	Top Artist Vude	Won
2014	Best Stage Entertainer	Won
2014	Top Artist Vude	Won
2015	Best Stage Entertainer	Won
2016	Best Stage Entertainer	Won
2016	Bula Fm Award For Best Group	Won

== Discography ==
=== Album ===
- 2008: R.K.S Vol. 1
- 2009: Yali Na Dina Vol. 2
- 2010: Au Sega Ni Kila Vol. 3
- 2011: Velavela Dina Vol. 4
- 2012: Sa sevi koso na senikau Vol.
- 2013: Taqiri Tu Na Lali Vol. 6
- 2014: Noqu I Tau Vol. 7
- 2016: Domo Kamica Kei Nasau Vol. 8 with Savu Ni Delai Lomai
- 2016: Rosi Ni Waisiliva Vol. 8
- 2017: Na Dina Vol. 9

== Members ==
- Jiosefa Vetaukula
- Savenaca Nukucebuya
- Laisiasa Koroi
- Josaia Vetaukula

== See also ==
- Fiji Performing Rights Association
- Procera Music
