= Saimone Vuatalevu =

Fijian musician

Saimone Vuatalevu is a veteran Fijian musician who has had a career in music lasting more than 45 years. He also known for the popular Fijian hit, "Tucake Mai".

== Background ==
=== 1960s to 1980s ===
His career started in 1968 when he was aged 21, winning his first local talent quest. He also fronted a bad called the Quin Tikis in the late 1960s. In 1986, he found success with the hit "Tucake Mai" which would go on to become a classic.

During the 1980s, when audio cassettes were the primary recorded format in the Fijian music industry, Vuatalevu performed and released music alongside other prominent artists of the era, including Sakiusa Bulicokocoko and Laisa Vulakoro..

=== 1990s to 2000s ===
By 1998, he had won his fifth Vacalutu-i-Voce Award. In April, 2016, two of his compositions were nominated in the FPRA Music awards. They were "Mere Khuda Meri Dohai Sun" in the Best Hindi Song category and "Noqu Kalou Au Tagi vei Kemuni" in the Best Gospel Song category.

In 2014, his album Na Loloma Uasivi, a 10-track compilation of some of his more memorable work was released. In July, 2019, his song "Tucake Mai" was danced to by around 60 year 7 and 8 students who also paid tribute to Fiji by singing the national anthem at the Pacific Games opening ceremony.

As of 2019, he is the chairman for The Fiji Performing Rights Association.

== Discography ==
- Saimone Vuatalevu and the Quin Tikis - Hibiscus HS-4
- My originals - Mangrove MGV CD 1330 - 2001
- Na Loloma Uasivi - 2014
