= Julio Foolio =

American rapper (1998–2024)

- Jones in 2022
- Born: Charles Andrew Jones II; June 21, 1998; Jacksonville, Florida, U.S.
- Died: June 23, 2024 (aged 26); Tampa, Florida, U.S.
- Cause of death: Gunshot wounds
- Other name: Lil 6
- Occupation: Rapper
- Years active: 2014–2024
- Musical career
- Genres: Hip-hop; drill
- Label: Create

Charles Andrew Jones II (June 21, 1998 – June 23, 2024), known professionally as Julio Foolio or simply Foolio, was an American rapper from Jacksonville, Florida. He was associated with the city's rap scene and was involved in high-profile feuds with other rappers. Jones was also linked to local gang activity, with his music often addressing these affiliations. Rival gang members shot and killed him on June 23, 2024, in a hotel parking lot in Tampa, Florida.

== Early life ==
Charles Andrew Jones II was born on June 21, 1998, in Jacksonville, Florida, where he grew up in the Moncrief neighborhood and was a member of the "6 Block" set of the street gang KTA ("Kill Them All"). His father, Charles Andrew Jones, was murdered in a 2011 shooting in Jacksonville. In February 2019, Jones' younger brother, Adrian "Bibby" Gainer Jr., was killed outside an apartment complex in Jacksonville.

== Career ==
Early in his career, Jones collaborated with local Jacksonville rapper Natalac where he featured on "Bridge this Gap" from Natalac's most star-studded featured album Pimp of the Nation released on U.S. federal Holiday "Presidents Day" Monday, February 19, 2018. His breakout came soon after with independent tracks releases "Crooks" and "Voodoo" releasing on June 14 and November 9 of the same year respectively, which gained popularity and millions of views on social media. His music gained further attention through his widely publicized feud with Yungeen Ace. Vulture described Jones' 2019 mixtape Never Wanted Fame as "preoccupied with death and jail visits, ailing family members and creeping paranoia." Jones released his debut album, Life of Me, in 2022. Two more albums, Final Destination (2023) and Resurrection (2024), followed before his death.

In 2017, Jones' 18-year-old cousin, Zion Malik Brown, was shot and killed in his home. This is believed to have started the deadly gang war in Jacksonville, as rapper Yungeen Ace was wounded alongside his brother and two friends being killed in a 2018 retaliatory shooting, and Jones posted derogatory content about the victims on social media. In 2021, Ace released the diss track "Who I Smoke" which led to Jones releasing "When I See You", a remix of Fantasia's "When I See U", in the same year, starting the Florida drill music scene.

Jones was shot and wounded in July 2023 in Houston, Texas, and he claimed previously in a November 2021 interview that he "shot back in self-defense. My gun is registered." On October 7, 2023, he was shot in the foot while driving in Jacksonville. In 2023, a former security guard for rapper YoungBoy Never Broke Again stated during an interview that his client had an incident where Jones and his group confronted him. According to Jones in a 2021 DJ Vlad interview, unreleased YoungBoy Never Broke Again tracks were leaked online with the hashtag "#FOOLIODISS". In an April 2024 post to his Instagram account, Jones commented on the "tragic [...] multiple attempts on my life."

== Murder ==
On June 23, 2024, Jones was fatally shot while celebrating his birthday in Tampa, Florida.

Prior to the shooting, Jones shared a video advertising a pool party on Instagram, where he had one million followers, and directed his followers to direct-message him for the address. Later that evening, he posted that police had kicked him and his entourage out of an Airbnb, and that he was moving the party to a new location.

Jones had been attempting to book a room at a Home2 Suites when he was ambushed by three armed shooters in the parking lot. He was pronounced dead at the scene. Three others were wounded in the incident.

Alicia Andrews, 21, Isaiah Chance Jr., 21, Sean Gathright, 18, and Rashad Murphy, 30, were arrested in Jacksonville, Florida for their suspected involvement in the murder. Davion Murphy, 27, was arrested at an apartment complex in Jacksonville after over six months on the run. According to Tampa Police Chief Lee Bercaw, Jones was murdered as part of a retaliation by rival gang members.

On October 31, 2025, Alicia Andrews was convicted of manslaughter and acquitted of conspiracy to commit murder. On May 22, 2026, Andrews was sentenced to 15 years in prison.

On April 22, 2026, the trial for Isaiah Chance, Sean Gathright, Rashad Murphy, and Davion Murphy began as prosecutors seek the death penalty. On May 8, all four defendants standing trial were found guilty of all charges ranging from First Degree murder to Attempted Second Degree Murder and Conspiracy to Commit First Degree Murder. On May 15, the jury recommended that all four defendants receive life imprisonment without the possibility of parole instead of the death penalty during the penalty phase. The four male defendants were formally sentenced to life without parole by a trial judge on June 22, 2026.

== Discography ==
=== Albums ===
Title	Album details
Life of Me	Released: July 15, 2022; Label: Create; Format: Digital download
Final Destination	Released: March 3, 2023; Label: Create; Format: Digital download
Resurrection	Released: April 5, 2024; Label: Create; Format: Digital download

=== Singles ===
Year	Single
2018	"Voo Doo"
2019	"Crazy Story Pt 6"
2019	"Rough Rider"
2020	"Shoot It Out (Sit Down Remix)"
2020	"Play With Me"
2020	"Bibby Story"
2021	"BeatBox Remix/Bibby Flow" (featuring Cojack)
2021	"When I See You Remix"
2021	"List of Dead Opps"
2021	"I Hate You I Love You"
2021	"Back In Blood"
2021	"WWE"
2022	"Dead Opps Pt. 2"
2023	"Get Back"

==== As featured artist ====
List of singles as featured artist
Title	Year	Album
"Bridge This Gap" (Natalac featuring Julio Foolio)	2018	Pimp of the Nation

== See also ==
- List of murdered hip-hop musicians
