= JayDaYoungan =

American rapper and singer (1998–2022)

- JayDaYoungan in 2021

Background information
- Born: Javorius Tykies Scott; July 15, 1998; Bogalusa, Louisiana, U.S.
- Died: July 27, 2022 (aged 24) Bogalusa, Louisiana, U.S.
- Cause of death: Gunshot Wounds (Homicide)
- Genres: Southern hip-hop; trap; gangsta rap; mumble rap
- Occupations: Rapper; singer; songwriter
- Years active: 2016–2022
- Labels: Cinematic; Ruffwayy; Atlantic
- Website: jaydayoungan.com

Javorius Tykies Scott (July 15, 1998 – July 27, 2022), known professionally as JayDaYoungan, was an American rapper and singer. He was best known for his 2019 single "23 Island", which received double platinum certification by the Recording Industry Association of America (RIAA). After signing with Atlantic Records, the song was included on both his debut commercial mixtape Misunderstood (2019) and debut studio album, Baby23 (2020)—both of which entered the top 50 of the Billboard 200. His second and third commercial mixtapes, Endless Pain (2019) and 23 Is Back (2021), were released before his death on July 27, 2022, when he was fatally shot by five unknown assailants.

== Early life ==
Javorius Scott was born on July 15, 1998, in Bogalusa, Louisiana. Growing up, he listened to Boosie Badazz, Lil Wayne, and Chief Keef. Scott played on his high school’s basketball team and wanted to go to the NBA, but was eventually kicked off the team due to poor grades. He dropped out in his senior year to pursue a career in rapping.

== Career ==
=== 2017–2018: Beginnings, "Interstate", and Forever 23 ===
In February 2017 Scott released his mixtape Ruffwayy, which became a regional success and gave him local recognition; his song "Interstate" broke 4 million views on YouTube in under a month. He was then considered for a spot on the XXL freshman list in 2018, a list of up-and-coming rappers.

After the project Scott released the mixtape The Real Jumpman 23, which had 13 tracks totaling 32 minutes, including the songs "Sliding Freestyle" and "Muddy Situation". He then released mixtapes Wake Up and Taking Off, the latter of which featured rappers FG Famous and NBA 3Three.

His first nationwide hit came with the song "Elimination" on the mixtape 23, which has over 145.3 million streams on Spotify as of September 2025. He was interviewed by the lyric company Genius to break down the meaning of the song. The mixtape had 10 tracks at 28 minutes with no features. Then he released the mixtape Forever 23, including the tracks "Thot Thot" and "Purge", which have garnered 76 and 33 million streams respectively on Spotify and helped push him into international recognition. The critic site AllMusic rated the mixtape 3.5/5 stars, and despite it having no features, the mixtape reached number 86 on the Billboard 200 becoming his first entry on that chart. It also hit number 37 on the Top R&B/Hip-Hop Albums.

=== 2019–2022: Endless Pain, "23 Island", Misunderstood and 23 Is Back ===
Following this, JayDaYoungan released the mixtape Endless Pain, which became known for the tracks "Repo" and "War Ready" which stand at 10 and 6.9 million streams respectively on SoundCloud as of May 25, 2023. The album peaked at number 70 and number 37 on Billboard 200 and the Top R&B/Hip-Hop albums, respectively. He and rapper Yungeen Ace then released the collaborative mixtape Can't Speak On It, which included the songs "Opps" and "Creep Behind". He then released another mixtape titled Misunderstood, which included the single "23 Island", which garnered 180.3 million streams on Spotify as of February 28, 2025, and reached number 9 of the Bubbling Under R&B/Hip-Hop Chart. The mixtape had features from YFN Lucci, Boosie Badazz, FG Famous, JetSoo, and Lil Durk. Durk remixed the track "Dum" which was featured on the mixtape Endless Pain. It featured 19 tracks at 53 minutes, and charted on the Billboard 200, peaking at number 43. JayDaYoungan and rapper Yung Bans had an online feud over the title of the album, as Bans released his debut album earlier in the year, also titled Misunderstood.

On January 3, 2020, Jay reached number 36 on the Billboard Emerging Artists Chart.

In May 2020, JayDaYoungan released "Touch Your Toes" featuring rapper Mulatto (now known as Latto), as a single from his debut album Baby23, which was released on June 5, 2020, and named after his first child who was also born the same night. The album included the singles "23 Island", "Perky Activated" and "38k", and featured Dej Loaf, Moneybagg Yo, and Kevin Gates.

On June 11, 2021, Jay released his final mixtape, 23 Is Back, a 13-track project which has no features.

== Musical style ==
Scott stated that he grew up listening to fellow Louisiana-based rappers Kevin Gates and Boosie Badazz, as well as Midwestern rapper Chief Keef. Musically, his flow and style has drawn comparisons to the former, as well as Youngboy Never Broke Again. He said, "[I] don't see me sounding similar to nobody else", and that he is not trying to imitate anybody else. He was noted for a style similar to that of Lil Wayne and Kevin Gates by critic Fred Thomas.

Scott spoke of his goals: "Later on in my career, when I get to a certain point, I will be signing artists, starting my own label. Just perfecting my craft each and every day."

== Legal issues ==
On May 11, 2019, Scott was charged with felony possession of a controlled substance without a prescription after being pulled over by Florida Highway Patrol in Gadsden County, Florida. When pulled over, police officers found 20 grams of marijuana, drug paraphernalia, and oxycodone pills. Someone who was riding with him was also found to be in possession of a firearm. The people riding with him were given various other charges relating to the drugs and firearm. On May 12, Scott was released on a $2,500 bail. Scott was scheduled to perform at the Rolling Loud Music Festival and was unable to due to his arrest.

In March 2020, he assaulted a pregnant woman, police raided Scott's house, seizing $24,000 in cash, promethazine, oxycodone, and multiple firearms. Police arrested Scott after he was allegedly "found hiding in an attic." Scott was charged with assaulting a pregnant woman and illegal drug possession, with bail set at $20,000. Another man who was at his house, Kardell Robertson, was arrested for unlawful possession of a firearm and granted a $100 bail.

On September 16, 2021, Scott was arrested on charges of accessory to second-degree murder and obstruction of justice, stemming from a fatal shooting that occurred in August 2020. Four days later, Scott was released on a $175,000 bond.

On October 30, 2021, Scott was arrested during a traffic stop in Washington Parish, Louisiana on multiple charges including child desertion, driving without proof of insurance, drug possession, and evidence tampering. On November 4, 2021, Scott was released from jail on bond.

On November 4, 2021—hours after posting bond in his Washington Parish case—Scott was arrested by Bureau of Alcohol, Tobacco, Firearms, and Explosives agents on federal charges.

On June 16, 2022, Scott pleaded guilty to possession of a firearm while under indictment or felony charges and was sentenced to time served, as well as one year of supervised release. He was also fined $5,500 and a $100 mandatory special assessment fee.

From 2017 until 2022 it’s stated in federal and state court documents that Scott’s gang committed dozens of acts of violence in and around the city of Bogalusa and neighboring parishes. They were also convicted of dealing in cocaine, heroin, methamphetamine and marijuana. In 2024 16 members including 2 of Scott’s brothers were indicted in a racketeering enterprise. Sentences have yet to be announced.

== Death ==
On July 27, 2022, Scott and his father, Kenyatta Scott, were sitting on the front lawn of their home in Bogalusa, Louisiana when three gunmen got out from a black truck located near their home. Scott and his father tried running inside the home, but two additional gunmen came from the side of the house and opened fire. Kenyatta shot back with his own firearm in self-defense. Scott was shot at least eight times and died at a local hospital in Bogalusa. Kenyatta was shot twice in the arm and was in stable condition. As of 2026, no suspects were arrested and Scott's murder remains unsolved.

=== Funeral ===
Scott's funeral was held on August 7, 2022, in the auditorium of his former high school in Bogalusa. Among those in attendance were notable artists Boosie Badazz and Yungeen Ace.

== Discography ==
=== Studio albums ===
Title	Details	Peak chart positions		
Title	Details	US	US R&B/HH	US Rap
Baby23	Released: June 5, 2020; Label: RuffWayy, Atlantic; Formats: Digital download, streaming	46	30	23

=== Posthumous albums ===
Title	Details	Peak chart positions
Title	Details	US
Forever 23 2x	Release date: February 3, 2023; Label: RuffWayy, Atlantic; Formats: Digital download, streaming	188

=== EPs ===
Title	EP details
Scarred	Released: January 22, 2022; Label: RuffWayy, Atlantic; Format: Digital Download
All Is Well	Released: March 25, 2022; Label: RuffWayy, Atlantic; Format: Digital Download

=== Mixtapes ===
Title	Details	Peak chart positions	
Title	Details	US	US R&B/HH
Younganimal	Released: October 26, 2016; Label: RuffWayy; Format: Digital Download	—	—
RuffWayy	Released: February 23, 2017; Label: RuffWayy; Formats: Digital download	—	—
The Real Jumpman 23	Released: November 16, 2017; Label: RuffWayy; Formats: Digital download, streaming	—	—
Wake Up	Released: December 25, 2017; Label: RuffWayy; Formats: Digital download, streaming	—	—
Taking Off	Released: April 6, 2018; Label: RuffWayy; Formats: Digital download, streaming	—	—
23	Released: July 15, 2018; Label: RuffWayy; Formats: Digital download, streaming	—	—
Forever 23	Released: December 7, 2018; Label: RuffWayy, Universal Music Group; Formats: Digital download, streaming	86	37
Endless Pain	Released: May 17, 2019; Label: RuffWayy, Atlantic; Formats: Digital download, streaming	70	37
Can't Speak on It (with Yungeen Ace)	Released: June 28, 2019; Label: Cinematic Music Group; Formats: Digital download, streaming	—	—
Misunderstood	Released: October 11, 2019; Label: RuffWayy, Atlantic; Formats: Digital Download, streaming	43	23
23 Is Back	Released: June 11, 2021; Label: RuffWayy, Atlantic; Format: Digital download, streaming	—	—
"—" denotes a recording that did not chart or was not released in that territory.

=== Singles ===
Title	Year	Peak chart positions	Certifications	Album
Title	Year	US Bub.	Certifications	Album
"Elimination"	2018	—	RIAA: 2× Platinum	23
"Thot Thot"	2018	—	RIAA: Gold	Forever 23
"Repo"	2019	—		Endless Pain
"Opps" (with Yungeen Ace)	2019	—	RIAA: Gold	Can't Speak On It
"23 Island"	2019	17	RIAA: 2× Platinum	Misunderstood
"38K"	2020	—		Baby23
"ZaZa"	2021	—		23 Is Back
"Spot Em"	2021	—		23 Is Back

== See also ==
- List of murdered hip hop musicians
