= Kula Kei Uluivuya =

- Also known as: K.K.U
- Origin: Taveuni, Fiji
- Genres: Pop, Reggae
- Years active: 2013–present

Kula Kei Uluivuya is a Fijian music band based in Fiji. Viliame Cokanauto is the lead singer for the Band. Kula Kei Uluivuya is derived from the traditional bird of the Vuya people in the province of Bua, thus Kula Kei Uluivuya in English means the Kula bird of Uluivuya. Uluivuya being the tall hill overlooking Vuya, Navave, Nabouwalu and all the other nearby villagers.

Viliame Cokanauto the founder and also band frontman started Kula Kei Uluivuya when he was 19 years old with his uncle Ifereimi Draunimasi, and Tu Jo a close family friend from Wailea in Vatuwaqa. Initially they did birthday gigs, through sigidrigi.

Months later, Kula Kei Uluivuya was introduced to the University of the South Pacific through a talent show where Viliame called in Luke Rogocake and Steven Wormack to join him under the K.K.U label. Soon after this show Kula Kei Uluivuya recorded a full album that hit Fiji like wildfire with the help of their smash hit TAGIMOUCIA.

It is safe to say that their first album produced by Solomon Islands Musical Artist and Producer Young Davie was a success as Tagimoucia had Viliame Cokanauto, their Lead Singer/Songwriter awarded the Best New Artist Award and Most Popular Song award at the Inaugural FPRA MUSIC AWARDS, which was also said to be Fiji's biggest night in Music.

To date, Kula Kei Uluivuya or K.K.U is still up and running under the representation of Viliame Cokanauto and K.K.U performs live at the end of every month at the Uprising Beach Resort.

== Awards and nominations ==
=== Fiji Performing Rights Association Music Awards ===
Year	Recipient	Category	Result
2014	Tagimoucia	Most Popular Song	Won
2014		Best New Artist	Won
2014	Tagimoucia	Best Itaukei Song	Nominated
2016	Noqu Senikau	Most Popular Music Video	Won
2017	VASITI REKISA	Most Popular Music Video	Nominated
2017	MY LOVE FOR YOU by CAKAU KEI LOMAI (Ft. YOUNG DAVIE)	Most Popular Music Video	Nominated
2017		Artist of the Year	Nominated

== Discography ==
=== Album ===
- I Am KKU (2014)
- Tagimoucia (2013)

=== Single ===
- Toso Mai Noqu Lewa (2015)
- Toso Mai Noqu Lewa (2015)
- Without Ur Love (2015)
- Adi Tagimoucia (2015)
- Grammar Hia (2015)
- Adi asenaca (2016)
- Duri Mai Tavale (2016)
- Raijieli (2017)
- Lewa Mo Nanuma (2017)

== See also ==
- Fiji Performing Rights Association
- List of Fijians
