= Misunderstood (Savuto Vakadewavosa song) =

2016 single by Savuto Vakadewavosa

"Misunderstand"

Single by Savuto Vakadewavosa & DJ Ritendra

from the album Misunderstood - Single
- Released: 16 May 2016
- Recorded: 2016
- Genre: R&B & Trap
- Length: 2:55
- Label: Lewavesi Production
- Songwriter(s): Savuto Vakadewavosa & DJ Ritendra
- Producer(s): Darxide DJ & DJ Ritendra

Savuto Vakadewavosa singles chronology
"Gauna Ni Sereki" (2015)	"Misunderstand" (2016)

"Misunderstood" is an English inspirational song written and composed by Fijian singer and songwriter Savuto Vakadewavosa and Fijian composer DJ Ritendra, This song was a collaboration between DJ Ritendra and Savuto Vakadewavosa and the song is about misunderstanding in friendship, the support vocals on this track was recorded by Darxide DJ and the track was produced and released in 2016. under Lewavesi production and the official remix version of the track was also mixed by DJ Ritendra and released in 2016, this single also won the Most Popular Music Video Award at 2018 Fiji Performing Rights Association Music Awards.

== Background ==
In an Interview released by Local Newspaper Fiji Times, Savuto Vakadewavosa discuss the song as "The song is about how painful it is or how much it got to me when friends of mine made assumptions about my decisions without trying to understand it," and "I felt so helpless and it got me down for a long time".

== Track listing ==
Digital Download
No.	Title	Length
1.	"Misunderstood"	2:55

Digital Download - Official Remix
No.	Title	Length
1.	"Misunderstood"	3:51

"Misunderstand - (Official Remix)"

Single by DJ Ritendra & Savuto Vakadewavosa

from the album Misunderstood (Official Remix) - Single
- Released: 16 May 2016
- Recorded: 2016
- Genre: Electronic; EDM; House
- Length: 3:51
- Label: Lewavesi Production
- Songwriter(s): Savuto Vakadewavosa & DJ Ritendra
- Producer(s): DJ Ritendra

DJ Ritendra singles chronology
"Misunderstand" (2016)	"Misunderstand - (Official Remix)" (2016)	"Underdogs with Elena Baravilala" (2017)

== Remix ==
Both the Original and Official Remix version of "Misunderstood" was released on 16 May 2016, under Lewavesi Production, this version of the track features hardcore Electronic dance music mixed by DJ Ritendra.

== Music video ==
DJ Ritendra and Savuto Vakadewavosa released the official music video of "Misunderstood" on 11 March 2017, The music video was broadcast on the national television in 'The Groove Thang' and ''Breakfast at Fiji One" show. DJ Ritendra also published the music video on his official Facebook page and released it on Vevo on 16 March 2017. The music video was received very well by the audience and the critics. and received the Most Popular Music Video Award at 2018 Fiji Performing Rights Association Music Awards.

== Awards ==
=== Fiji Performing Rights Association Music Awards ===
Year	Category	Result
2018	Most Popular Music Video	Won
