= Adán Zapata =

Mexican rapper

Background information
- Also known as: Adán Zapata
- Born: Adán Zapata Mireles; October 20, 1990
- Died: June 1, 2012 (aged 21) San Nicolás de los Garza, Nuevo León, Mexico
- Genres: Hip hop; gangsta rap
- Occupations: Rapper, singer
- Years active: 2006–2012
- Label: Zapata Producciones
- Formerly of: Mente En Blanco
- Website: Mente en Blanco

Adán Zapata Mireles (October 20, 1990 – June 1, 2012), was a Mexican singer and rapper within the genre of hip-hop/rap. He was born and lived in the colony Mexico Lindo in San Nicolás de los Garza, Nuevo León. From 2006 he belonged to the group called Mente En Blanco (MEB), where he was lead vocalist and the one that raised the group, until his murder in the colony "Los Morales" San Nicolás de los Garza, Nuevo Leon on June 1, 2012, at the age of 21, by an armed command of organized crime together with 3 other young members of the same group "Blank Mind" — two of them children of a former secretary of public security.

== Murder ==
Adán Zapata was killed on June 1, 2012, at the age of 21, in the work of organized crime. He was in a van with 3 other members of the Blank Mind: Iván de Jesús Serna González, 25, known as DJ Esus, and brothers Diego Salvatore and Hector Daniel Almaraz Huerta, aged 20 and 19, respectively. The latter were children of the former Secretary of Public Security of the municipality of Guadalupe José Santos Almaraz.

=== Studio albums ===
- 2006 Anticuados
- 2007 Zapata Producciones
- 2010 Borrachos y Grifos
- 2011 The North Side Kings
- 2012 Soy de Barrio

== See also ==
- List of murdered hip hop musicians
