= Procera Music =

Fijian music distribution company

Procera Music, is the largest Record label in Fiji, headquartered in Suva. It is one of the biggest recording and music distribution companies in the South Pacific region. Procera Music was established in 1972 by Pravin Procera Mohanlal and Ashok Narsey. It is now owned and run by Mohammed Akif and it is well known for releasing Kirtan, Bhajan, Qawwali, Fijian, English and Gospel music.

== Procera Music Awards ==
Every year, Procera Music hosts its own music festival and music awards to honour achievements by Fiji's music artists.

=== 2012 Procera Music Awards ===
- Top Artist Vude: Malumu ni Tobu kei Naivaukura

=== 2014 Procera Music Awards ===
- Top Artist Vude: Malumu ni Tobu kei Naivaukura
- Best Stage Entertainer: Malumu ni Tobu kei Naivaukura

=== 2015 Procera Music Awards ===
- Special Recognition Award iTaukei: Simione Cabelevu (Domoni Savu), Inoke Kalounisiga & Uate Tui Ravai
- Special Recognition Award Hindi: Salen Prasad Pinky & Umeh Chand
- Life Time Award Achievement Award: Bill Beddoes
- Best Composer: Marika Vaniqi (Sea Domoni)
- Best Music Programmer: Adriu Saranuku
- Best stage entertainer: Jiosefa Veitakula of Malumu ni Tobu kei Naivaukura
- Top Choir Song: Ovea Church Choir
- Top Gospel Group: Theophilus
- Top Filmy Artist: DJ Pranil
- Top Lokgeet Artist: Mrs Madhu Lata
- Top Tamil Kirtan Artist: Mr Kaushal Mani
- Legend Award: Ashok Kumar
- Top Sigidrigi Artist: Waikoula kei Tavua
- Top Kirtan Artist Award: Avinesh Chand
- Top Bhajan Artist: Ahmol Chand, Shui Dayal
- Top Vude Artist: Jale Mareau

=== 2016 Procera Music Awards ===
- Special recognition awards iTaukei: Iliesa Baravilala and Vili Tuiaucala
- Special recognition award Hindi: Shiu Dayal
- Best recording engineer: Waisea Rogoyawal
- Best iTaukei composer: Apolosi Baravi - For Nasi Dredre
- Best stage entertainer award: Malumu ni Tobu kei Naivaukura
- Young talent awards: Kartik Pillay, Monish Kumar and Shanaal Nand
- Top artist qawali: Khalid Hussein
- Top Artist Filmy - Sunny Boy
- Top artist Pachara - Salend Prasad (Pinky)
- Bula Fm Award For Best Group - Malumu ni Tobu kei Naivaukura
- Radio Fiji Two Young Lokgeet Artist - Shelin Kumar (Nadro Princess)
- Top Tamil Kirtan Artist - Mr. Shivneel Raj (Shiv Shekar)
- Top Artist Lokgeet - Mrs Madhu Lata Pratap
- Top Artist Gospel - 3rd Covenant
- Legend Award - Mr Shiu Balak
- Top Artist Kirtan - Nitin Nilesh Prakash & Avinesh Chand
- Top Artist Sigidrigi - Drodrolagi Kei Nautosolo
- Top artist Vude - Voqa Kei Valenisau
- Top Artist Bhajan - Mr Ashok Kumar

=== 2017 Procera Music Awards ===
- Special Recognition Award (Hindi) - Umesh Sharma (Bhajan Artist from Sigatoka)
- Special Recognition Award (i-Taukei) - Dr Jone Senibici (Gospel Artist based in Canada)
- New Talent (Hindi) - Shamal Divnesh (Kirtan Artist from Labasa)
- New Talent (i-Taukei) - Mosese Baledrokadroka (Child artist from Lautoka)
- Best Composer - Josefa Levu
- Best Gospel Artist/Group - Third Covenant
- Best Recording Engineer - Adriu Saranuku
- Best Tamil Kirtan Artist - Shiv Shekar
- Best Pachra Artist - Shalen Prasad Pinky (Tavua)
- Best Stage Entertainer (i-Taukei) - Suliasi Uluilakeba
- Best Stage Entertainer (Hindi/Bhajan) - Anmol Chand (Nadi)
- Best Critic Award Vude (i-Taukei) - Kerry Damudamu
- Best Lokgeet Award - Madhu Lata (Labasa) and Sheleen Chand (Nadroga)
- Best Kirtan Artist - Nitin Nilesh Prakash (Labasa)
- Best Sigidrigi Award - Drodrolagi Kei Na Utosolo
- Best Bhajan Artist - Ajesh Ramjesh (Navua)
- Best Vude Artist - Savu Ni Delai Lomai

== See also ==
- Malumu ni Tobu kei Naivaukura
