= Vanessa Quai =

Vanuatuan singer

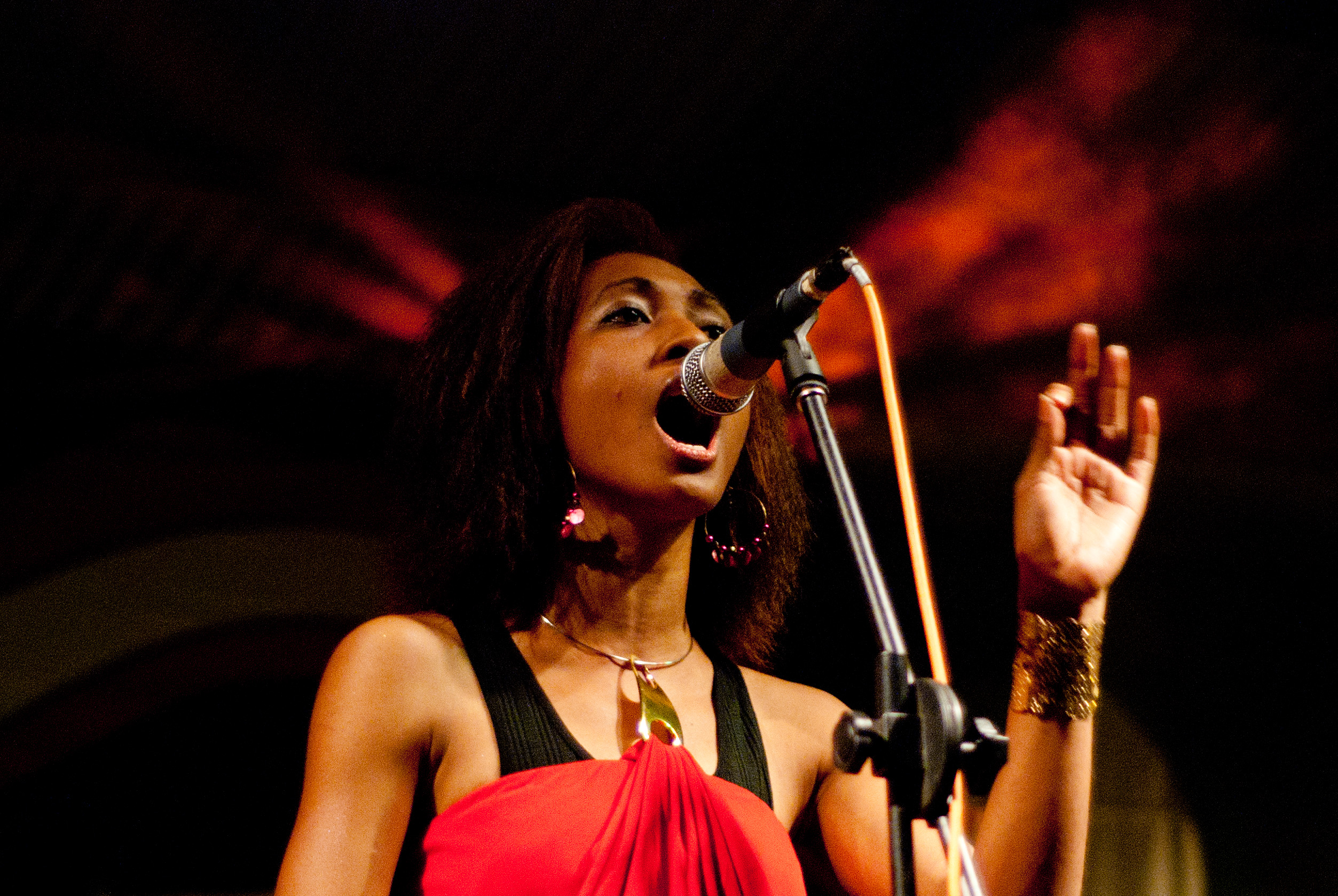
- Vanessa Quai in 2010

Background information
- Born: July 13, 1988 (age 36); Port Vila, Vanuatu
- Origin: Vanuatu
- Occupations: Singer
- Years active: 1998–present

Vanessa Diandra Sally Ann Kiristiana Quai, better known as Vanessa Quai, born July 13, 1988, in Port Vila, is a ni-Vanuatu singer.

== Overview ==
She recorded her first album, To Aitape With Love (recorded at Vanuata Production, produced at Pacific Gold Studio), as a child singer, aged 9, in 1998. In 1999, she was one of 3000 competitors at the South Pacific International Song contest held in Gold Coast, Queensland, and was the only child competitor. She won third prize in the Gospel/Inspirational Category. Later that same year, she took first prize at the Nile International Children Song Contest, in Cairo. 1999 was the year she "hit the international music scene", according to the Vanuatu Weekly Hebdomadaire.

Quai's second, third and fourth albums -Beautiful Pacific Islands, The Untouched Paradise and Pacifika- were released between 2000 and 2003. In 2004, her album Promise was a cooperation with Papua New Guinean group Soul Harmony, and was described as bearing a strong "R&B flavour".

In 2002, her song "Freedom" topped the radio charts in Vanuatu and the Solomon Islands, and ranked second on the charts in Papua New Guinea. In 2004, she won first prize at the International Teenagers Singing Competition, in Bucharest, with a jury presided over by Lane Davies.

In 2012, she was preparing her tenth album, and preparing for a tour in the United States in September. She performed at the Gentilly Festival in New Orleans.

Pacific Islands Radio describes her music as being primarily gospel songs, but also "rang[ing] from traditional to modern music". The Papua New Guinea Post-Courier describes her music as gospel music, "mixed with slow ballads, R‘n’B, hip hop and South Pacific flavour", and notes that she sings in "many languages", including Tok Pisin and Motu. Quai's mother is Fijian, and she also sings in Fijian. During a concert in the Solomon Islands in January 2009, her music was described as "a blend of island, reggae, dance and hip-hop beats".

Quai has been described by Pacific Islands Radio as "a very popular artist in the whole Pacific region". In 2004, the Papua New Guinea Post-Courier described her as "Vanuatu’s No.1 music artist, and one of the South Pacific’s best female singing sensations". The Solomon Times in 2007 described her as "very popular" in the Solomon Islands. The Solomon Star in 2008 described her as "a household name in the Pacific" and possibly "the most successful female artist in the region"; in 2012 described her as "the Pacific singing super-star". Her music is reportedly popular in French Polynesia, and in 2008 she became the first Melanesian singer to tour Tahiti.

In April 2009, The Guardian described Quai as one of Vanuatu's "living cultural icons".

== Discography ==
=== Studio albums ===
- To Aitape With Love (1998)
- Beautiful Pacific Islands (2000)
- The Untouched Paradise (2002)
- Pacifika (2003)
- Promise (2004)
- Transformation (2005)
- Island Girl (2007)
- Light It Up (2018)
- Promise (2018)

=== Singles ===
- "Freedom" (2002)
- "Angel Over Me" with. Elena Baravilala & Davu (2014)
- "True Harmony" (2014)

== See also ==
- Elena Baravilala
