= Baby23 =

Studio album by JayDaYoungan
- Released: June 5, 2020
- Genres: Hip hop; trap
- Length: 59:45
- Labels: RuffWayy; Atlantic
- Producers: AceLex On da Track; Big B On da Track; BT Grin; DJThePlugg; Eighty8; HeartBeatz; JahDaGod; KP On the Beat; Markese; MrBlackOnDaTrack; Nashi; NoFuk; Rashonn D; Sean Notty; SephGotTheWaves; Shop With Terino; TayTayMadeIt; Trapman TwoThree; Treyo Snapped; Xeryus

JayDaYoungan chronology
Misunderstood (2019)	Baby23 (2020)

Singles from Baby23
- 1. "23 Island" Released: August 21, 2019; 2. "Perky Activated" Released: March 21, 2020; 3. "38K" Released: April 8, 2020; 4. "Touch Your Toes" Released: May 29, 2020

Baby23 is the only studio album by American rapper JayDaYoungan. It was released on June 5, 2020, by RuffWayy Records and Atlantic Records. It features guest appearances by rappers Latto, Dej Loaf, Moneybagg Yo, and Kevin Gates. The album was supported by four singles: "23 Island", "Perky Activated", "38K", and "Touch Your Toes". It is the only studio album JayDaYoungan released during his lifetime, as he was shot and killed outside of his home on July 27, 2022.

== Critical reception ==
AllMusic wrote that the album "balanced [JayDaYoungan's] aggressive, street-centric lyrics and bass-heavy production with some thoughtful introspection and moments incorporating acoustic guitar samples." In a posthumous review, Steve Juon of RapReviews.com wrote, "It’s clear from Baby23 that JayDaYoungan had the ambition to succeed and a sound that would easily fit into whatever "Power" or "Hot" FM radio station is big in your city." He named "Try Me", "Nightmares", and "23 Island" as highlights, writing, "In songs like 'Nightmares' we see that JayDaYoungan letting Javorius shine though, saying that the constant hate directed his way was keeping him up at night more than Kid Cudi.

== Track listing ==
Baby23 track listing
No.	Title	Producer(s)	Length
1.	"Shottas"	KP On the Beat; HeartBeatz	2:59
2.	"Iron Slang"	MrBlackOnDaTrack; HeartBeatz	1:50
3.	"Draco"	TayTayMadeIt	2:34
4.	"Step"	BT Grin	2:26
5.	"Try Me"	Rashonn D; JahDaGod	2:44
6.	"Perky Activated"	Nashi; SephGotTheWaves	1:55
7.	"38K"	Shop With Terino	2:05
8.	"Nightmares"	SephGotTheWaves; Eighty8	2:59
9.	"10 for 10"	NoFuk; Treyo Snapped	2:22
10.	"Touch Your Toes" (featuring Latto)	Sean Notty; Xeryus	2:18
11.	"Meet the Doctor"	Trapman TwoThree	1:52
12.	"IDK" (featuring Dej Loaf)	AceLex On da Track; Big B On da Track	3:26
13.	"Do Your Dance" (featuring Moneybagg Yo)	MrBlackOnDaTrack; HeartBeatz	2:52
14.	"Talking to Myself"	TayTayMadeIt	3:36
15.	"Cold Case"	HeartBeatz	1:46
16.	"Solo"	DJThePlugg	3:02
17.	"Peer Pressure" (featuring Kevin Gates)	HeartBeatz	3:34
18.	"Keep It Real"	Big B On da Track	2:07
19.	"Crying Inside"	Markese; DP On the Beat; HeartBeatz	2:42
20.	"Fuck Shit"	Trapman TwoThree	1:43
21.	"Down to Business"	JahDaGod; Trapman TwoThree	2:50
22.	"Do You Wanna Get Away"	BT Grin	2:00
23.	"23 Island"	BT Grin	4:03
Total length:			59:45

== Charts ==
Chart performance for Baby23
Chart (2022)	Peak position
US Billboard 200	46
US Top R&B/Hip-Hop Albums (Billboard)	30
