= HotNewHipHop =

Online publication

- Categories: Hip-hop; pop culture
- Founded: 2007
- Company: Urbanlinx Media Inc.
- Country: Canada, United States
- Language: English
- Website: hotnewhiphop.com

HotNewHipHop (HNHH) is an online publication that covers daily news about hip-hop and pop culture, including streetwear, sports, and sneakers. In addition to its editorial content, HotNewHipHop also produces the video series, How to Roll, On The Come Up, In My Bag, and Snack Review. The site has been nominated multiple times for the BET Hip Hop Awards in the category, "The best Hip Hop Platform."

== History ==
HotNewHipHop was launched in 2007 by Montreal-based Lebanese Armenian Saro Derbedrossian, also known as Saro D. alongside DJ Rockstar. Despite being founded in Canada, HNHH covers the broader hip-hop culture as opposed to simply just focusing on Canadian hip-hop like HipHopCanada.

The site began as a single webpage that users would visit to listen to daily releases of new hip-hop songs. It has since developed to also include online publications and blog releases within the hip-hop industry.

HotNewHipHop has also worked with Sprite on a video series titled "Thirst for Yours" in 2019.

HotNewHipHop has about 20 employees between its locations in Montreal, Toronto, New York City, and Los Angeles. It has about 12 million unique visitors every month, most of whom come from the United States and Canada.

Throughout the years, HotNewHipHop has been nominated on multiple occasions for the BET Hip Hop Awards as "Best Hip Hop Online Site" and "Best Hip Hop Platform".
