= Curu Mai =

2012 song by Savuto Vakadewavosa

Single by Savuto Vakadewavosa

from the album Ra Sa Cariba
- Released: 30 November 2012
- Recorded: 2012
- Genre: Pop
- Length: 3:53
- Label: Music Production House Australia
- Songwriter(s): Savuto Vakadewavosa
- Producer(s): Isireli Gumatua, DJ Ritendra

Savuto Vakadewavosa singles chronology
"Bulou Noqu I Tau" (2011)	"Curu Mai" (2012)	"Sa I Vagadaci" (2012)

"Curu Mai" is a song written and composed by Fijian singer and songwriter Savuto Vakadewavosa under the direction of producer Isireli Gumatua. The song is based on Lelean Memorial School and the support vocals on this track were recorded by VLY Navoka and the track was produced in 2012. This track was also part of Savuto Vakadewavosa's debut studio album, Ra Sa Cariba, which was released in 2015 under Music Production House Australia and the official remix version of the track mixed by DJ Ritendra and released in 2015.

== Track listing ==
Digital Download
No.	Title	Length
1.	"Curu Mai"	3:53

Ra Sa Cariba - CD
No.	Title	Length
1.	"Curu Mai"	3:53

Digital Download - DJ Ritendra Remix
No.	Title	Length
1.	"Curu Mai"	4:05

"Curu Mai - (Official Remix)"

Single by DJ Ritendra ft. Savuto Vakadewavosa

from the album Curu Mai (Official Remix) - Single
- Released: 6 July 2015
- Recorded: 2015
- Genre: Electronic; EDM; House
- Length: 4:05
- Label: Lewavesi Production
- Songwriter(s): Savuto Vakadewavosa
- Producer(s): DJ Ritendra

DJ Ritendra singles chronology
"Gauna Ni Sereki" (2015)	"Curu Mai - (Official Remix)" (2015)	"Misunderstand" (2016)

== Remix ==
A remix version featuring DJ Ritendra premiered on 22 June 2015 and the remix was officially released on 6 July 2015 under Lewavesi Production.

== Awards ==
=== Fiji Performing Rights Association Music Awards ===
Year	Category	Result
2015	Best Itaukei Song	Won
2015	Most Popular Song	Nominated
