= Yungeen Ace =

American rapper (born 1998)

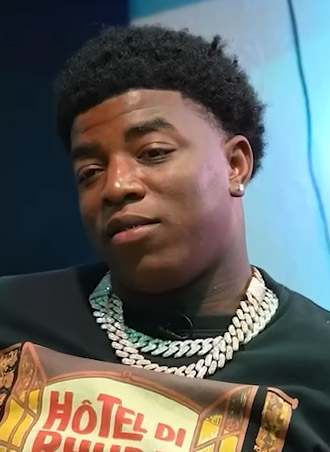
- Yungeen Ace in 2025

Background information
- Born: Keyanta Tyrone Bullard; February 12, 1998 (age 28); East Chicago, Indiana, U.S.
- Origin: Jacksonville, Florida, U.S.
- Genres: Southern hip-hop; drill; trap; contemporary R&B
- Occupations: Rapper; singer; songwriter
- Years active: 2016–present
- Labels: Cinematic; Geffen; ATK
- Children: 3
- Website: lifeofatk.com

Keyanta Tyrone Bullard (born February 12, 1998), better known by his stage name Yungeen Ace, is an American rapper and singer. Bullard's music often references crime, violence and emotional pain.

Bullard is best known for his 2019 single "Opps" (with JayDaYoungan), which received gold certification by the Recording Industry Association of America (RIAA), along with his 2018 song "Pain" and 2021 single, "Who I Smoke" (with Spinabenz and FastMoney Goon featuring Whoppa Wit Da Choppa). He signed a recording contract with Cinematic Music Group in 2018, which entered a joint venture with Geffen Records four years later.

He entered the Billboard 200 twice with his third mixtape Step Harder (2019) and debut studio album, Life of Betrayal 2x (2021).

== Early life ==
Keyanta Tyrone Bullard was born in East Chicago, Indiana, on February 12, 1998. He grew up in a small home in Jacksonville, alongside his mother and 11 brothers, relocating from Indiana to Florida at a young age.

== Career ==
=== 2017–2018: early success and debut mixtape ===
Bullard started his rapping career in 2017, releasing the song "Go To War" on January 18, 2017, as part of the local hip-hop group Yungeen Gang. On December 25, 2017, Bullard released his debut single, "No Witness". The song gained mainstream attention, with Bullard following up with multiple releases on WorldStarHipHop during the first half of 2018, such as "Find Myself", "All In" and "Fuck That". Bullard released his debut mixtape, Life of Betrayal, during the same year with record label Cinematic Music Group, gaining him further success in the rap industry. It had guest appearances with YoungBoy Never Broke Again and JayDaYoungan. It was later followed by Life I'm Livin in December.

=== 2019–2020: Step Harder and Don Doda ===
Ace started off 2019 by releasing the singles "So Long" and "Message" which currently have 2.9 and 5.4 million streams, respectively, on SoundCloud as of May 16, 2023. On July 1, 2019, he collaborated with JayDaYoungan to release the mixtape Can't Speak On It, which features the single "Opps", which currently has 61 million streams on Spotify. In August 2019, he released his debut EP, Chloe. He released his third mixtape, Step Harder, in November of that year. The mixtape was supported by singles such as "Freestyle" and "Bando" and features guest appearances from Blac Youngsta, Lil Durk, Dej Loaf, Boosie Badazz, Stunna 4 Vegas, and NoCap. It charted at number 81 on the Billboard 200.

In 2020, Ace was featured on the song "Trust Issues" from King Von's mixtape, Levon James. Ace also released his fourth mixtape, Don Dada, in June. It was supported by the singles "400 Shots", "I'm the One", and "Heartbroken" and has a single guest appearance with King Von.

=== 2021–present: debut studio album ===
In March 2021, Yungeen Ace, along with Spinabenz, FastMoney Goon, and Whoppa Wit Da Choppa, released a single titled "Who I Smoke". The song is a diss track targeted at Jacksonville rapper Foolio that samples "A Thousand Miles" by Vanessa Carlton. It has gained popularity on social media as well as controversy for its acts of violence and murder. The song was certified gold by the Recording Industry Association of America (RIAA) in July 2022. He released his debut studio album, Life of Betrayal 2x, later that year. It has guest appearances with King Von, G Herbo, and YFN Lucci, among others. Yungeen Ace has also collaborated with Nuski2Squad on the mixtape 2 Broken 2 Heal.

In 2022, he collaborated with fellow rapper Kodak Black on the song "B.A.M.", which was a single for his second studio album, All On Me. It had guest appearances from Kodak Black, Boosie Badazz, Baby 23, Toosii, Spinabenz, and YBeezy. In August, Ace released a single titled "Rekindle 23", which is a tribute to past rapper JayDaYoungan, who died in July. He released his third studio album, Survivor of the Trenches, which had guest appearances from SleazyWorld Go, EST Gee, Real Boston Richey, GMK, FastMoney Goon, and Rob49.

== Legal issues ==
In October 2017, Bullard was sentenced to 31 months of probation for an accessory charge.

=== 2018 shooting ===
On June 5, 2018, Bullard was involved in a mass shooting on the Town Center Parkway in Jacksonville, Florida. He suffered from eight gunshot wounds and was hospitalized in critical condition. It was reported that Bullard had been celebrating his close friend's 18th birthday at the Wasabi Japanese Steakhouse, as evident from social media posts by Bullard himself. He was traveling in a silver Chevrolet Malibu with three other occupants, including his brother, Trevon Bullard, all of whom died in the shooting. After being discharged from the hospital for lack of medical insurance, Bullard was arrested for violating his probation.

=== 2019 shooting ===
On March 10, 2019, Bullard was involved in another shooting incident at the Hampton Inn in Waycross, Georgia. His attorney, David Haas, told Action News Jax that Bullard and several others were chased through a parking lot at 3:30 that morning. Jeremy Brookins, also known as Ralo, a friend of Bullard, was killed in the shooting, with one other person being hospitalized after suffering several gunshot wounds.

=== ATK street gang ===
According to First Coast News, Bullard is the leader of the street gang ATK, which stands for "Ace To Kill". Members of ATK were charged for the murder of Julio Foolio.

== Personal life ==
Bullard has stated in various interviews that he has PTSD after the 2018 shooting.

On February 5, 2023, Bullard announced on Instagram that he is expecting his first child with his girlfriend, Chloe Glass. She gave birth to a son in July of that year.

== Discography ==
=== Studio albums ===
List of studio albums, with selected details
Title	Details	Peak chart positions
Title	Details	US
Life of Betrayal 2x	Released: July 2, 2021; Label: Cinematic Music Group, ATK; Format: Digital download, streaming	119
All on Me	Released: April 15, 2022; Label: Cinematic Music Group, ATK; Format: Digital download, streaming	—
Survivor of the Trenches	Released: December 2, 2022; Label: Cinematic Music Group, Geffen Records, ATK; Format: Digital download, streaming	—
Forgotten Star	Released: March 29, 2024; Label: self-released; Format: Digital download, streaming	—
I Control My Destiny	Released: November 29, 2024; Label: self-released; Format: Digital download, streaming	—
I Am What They Don't See	Released: July 11, 2025; Label: self-released; Format: Digital download, streaming	—
Pain & War Is Art	Released: July 11, 2025; Label: self-released; Format: Digital download, streaming	—
"—" denotes a recording that did not chart or was not released in that territory.

=== Mixtapes ===
List of mixtapes, with selected details
Title	Details	Peak chart positions	
Title	Details	US	US R&B/HH
Life of Betrayal	Released: August 3, 2018; Label: Cinematic Music Group; Format: Digital download, streaming	-	-
Life I'm Livin	Released: December 13, 2018; Label: Cinematic Music Group; Format: Digital download, streaming	-	-
Step Harder	Released: November 7, 2019; Label: Cinematic Music Group, ATK; Format: Digital download, streaming	81	45
Don Dada	Released: June 26, 2020; Label: Cinematic Music Group, ATK; Format: Digital download, streaming	-	-
"—" denotes a recording that did not chart or was not released in that territory.

=== Collaborative mixtapes ===
List of collaborative mixtapes, with selected details
Title	Details
Can't Speak on It (with JayDaYoungan)	Released: June 28, 2019; Label: Cinematic Music Group; Format: Digital download, streaming
2 Broken 2 Heal (with Nuski2Squad)	Released: November 19, 2021; Label: Cinematic Music Group, ATK; Format: Digital download, streaming

=== Extended plays ===
List of extended plays, with selected details
Title	Details
Chloe	Released: August 2, 2019; Label: Cinematic Music Group; Format: Digital download

=== Singles ===
==== As lead artist ====
Title	Year	Peak chart positions	Certifications	Album
Title	Year	US R&B/HH	Certifications	Album
"Opps" (with JayDaYoungan)	2019	—	RIAA: Gold	Can't Speak on It
"Gun Em Down"	2021	—		Life of Betrayal 2x
"Who I Smoke" (with Spinabenz and FastMoney Goon featuring Whoppa wit da Choppa)	2021	—	RIAA: Gold	Life of Betrayal 2x
"Giving Up"	2021	—		Life of Betrayal 2x
"Life of Sin"	2022	—		All on Me
"B.A.M." (with Kodak Black)	2022	—		All on Me
"Game Over"	2024	40		I Control My Destiny

=== Other certified songs ===
Title	Year	Certifications	Album
"Pain"	2018	* RIAA: Gold	Life of Betrayal
