= Laisa Vulakoro =

Fijian singer known as the Queen of Vude (born 1960)

- Born: 13 August 1960 (age 66); Yacata, Cakaudrove, Fiji
- Origin: Fiji
- Genres: Fijian folk music
- Occupations: Singer
- Years active: 1980s - Present

Laisa Vulakoro (born 13 August 1960) is a Fijian singer known as the Queen of Vude. She comes from the island of Yacata in Cakaudrove Province. Her music combines disco, rock and Fijian folk music. Vulakoro has performed since the 1980s and has released sixteen albums. During a period in Australia in the 1990s, Vulakoro performed with Australian rock singer Jimmy Barnes. Now a resident of Suva, Fiji's capital, Vulakoro is seen regularly at major national events. Her style incorporates a unique blend of Fiji traditional music, R&B, jazz and rock. She has been described as Fiji's answer to Renée Geyer.

== Political activities ==
Vulakoro condemned the military coup that deposed the elected government of Laisenia Qarase on 5 December 2006. After writing an unsympathetic letter to a local newspaper, Vulakoro found her Suva home raided and searched by members of the Republic of Fiji Military Forces on 26 December. She was subsequently taken to Suva's Queen Elizabeth Barracks for questioning at 1a.m. on 28 December. Before being released, she was warned to stop speaking out against the Military.

Fiji Television reported on 12 January 2007 that Vulakoro faced possible imprisonment on her return to Fiji, following the unexplained disappearance of international criminal Peter Foster, for whom she had put up F$5,000 in bail.

Vulakoro is reportedly the niece of war hero Sefania Sukanaivalu, the sole Fijian recipient of the Victoria Cross.

== Media appearances ==
In 2010 Vulakoro became a judge on the 3rd season of Fiji talent contest Vodafone M.I.C She continued her run on the show in 2011, and was set to return for the 5th season in 2012 but was later replaced. However she appeared as a guest judge in three episodes.

She appeared in episode 2 of the Martin Clunes miniseries Islands of the Pacific, which aired on 20 January 2022 and has been repeated since then.
