= Murder of Julio Foolio =

2024 murder of an American rapper in Florida

- CCTV footage of the murder
- Location: Tampa, Florida, United States
- Date: June 23, 2024; 2 years ago
- Target: Charles Andrew Jones II a.k.a. Julio Foolio
- Attack type: Murder by Shooting
- Deaths: 1 (Jones)
- Injuries: 3
- Verdict: Guilty
- Convictions: Andrews; Manslaughter; Chance, Gathright and the Murphys; First-degree murder Attempted murder (×3)
- Sentence: Andrews; 15 years' imprisonment Chance, Gathright, the Murphys; Life imprisonment without the possibility of parole
- Convicted: Isaiah Chance; Sean Gathright; Rashad Murphy; Davion Murphy; Alicia Andrews

On June 23, 2024, 26-year-old American rapper Charles Andrew Jones II, known professionally as Julio Foolio, was murdered by members of a rival gang in a hotel parking lot in Tampa, Florida. Subsequently, a total of four men and one woman were arrested and charged with murdering Jones. The female accomplice, Alicia Andrews, was found guilty of manslaughter and sentenced to 15 years' imprisonment, while the four men – Isaiah Chance, Sean Gathright, Rashad Murphy and Davion Murphy – were all found guilty of first-degree murder and sentenced to Life imprisonment without the possibility of parole in 2026.

== Murder ==
Julio Foolio in 2022

On the early morning of June 23, 2024, American rapper Charles Andrew Jones II, known by his stage name Julio Foolio, was murdered in a gang-related shooting that occurred in a parking lot at a Home2 Suites location in Tampa, Florida.

The night before, Jones, who turned 26 two days before his murder, was celebrating his birthday, and during the weekend before he died, Jones posted about his scheduled birthday celebration events on social media, and according to investigations, this information was being used as part of a pre-planned plot by rival gang members to kill him. Background information of Jones showed that Jones, a native of Jacksonville who first established his musical career back in 2017, was a member of the Jacksonville-based 6-Block gang, and the gang itself was entangled in an underworld conflict with two rival gangs, 1200 Out East and ATK (short for Ace's Top Killers), for more than a decade. At one point in 2018, Jones allegedly released a song taunting a man who was shot to death. Due to his gangland affiliations and this incident, Jones was targeted by his killers (who belonged to both ATK and 1200) as part of their ongoing feud, and he was previously wounded but survived in a shooting in October 2023.

Five suspects — four men and one woman — were involved in the plot to murder Jones. The woman was 21-year-old Alicia Latoya Andrews. The four men were 18-year-old Sean Andre Gathright, 21-year-old Isaiah Jermaine Chance, and brothers Davion Murphy, 27, and Rashad Murphy, 30. (Note: Some sources identified the Murphys as brothers, while others identified them as cousins.) Chance was a member of ATK while the Murphys belonged to the 1200. Investigators said Gathright had also been linked to the October 2023 attempted murder of Jones, as well as an unrelated 2022 homicide case. Authorities determined that the bullets used in the killing matched the same brand as shell casings recovered from both the 2022 murder scene and the 2023 shooting. The group travelled from Jacksonville to Tampa on the early morning of June 23, 2024, and reached the hotel hosting Jones's birthday celebration and waited in ambush.

At about 4am, Jones left the hotel with his three friends, and just as they entered Jones's car, three of the men – Gathright and the Murphys – stepped out of Gathright's car and approached Jones's vehicle; one of them was armed with a Glock pistol with an extended magazine, while the other two were armed with semi-automatic rifles. The trio surrounded the car, and multiple shots were fired at the car and another vehicle, before they fled back to Gathright's vehicle and left the scene. Chance and Andrews did not take part in the shooting but they acted as lookouts throughout the shooting, which resulted in the death of Jones and his three friends wounded.

An autopsy report by forensic pathologist Dr. Noah Reilly revealed that Jones was shot several times in his chest, back and right arm. One of the bullets had penetrated his lung, heart and aorta and reached the left side of his chest. A second bullet also struck Jones in his left lung and kidney. According to Dr. Reilly, one of Jones's gunshot wounds was so severe that he lost about two liters of blood.

== Charges and pre-trial developments ==
Police arresting the first three suspects

The death of Charles Jones was classified as murder, and the police began their investigations into the case. Given Jones's connections to the underworld of Jacksonville, the police placed the main focus of their investigations into the local Jacksonville gangs related to Jones. In light of the fatal shooting, Jacksonville Sheriff T. K. Waters publicly affirmed in a media statement that the authorities would not tolerate any acts of gang-related violence in the name of retribution or revenge, and urged the public to be vigilant. Jones's mother expressed hope that the police could capture the people responsible for murdering her son, and revealed that she tried to stop him from rapping out of fear for his safety.

On July 29, 2024, a month after the murder of Jones, Tampa Police Chief Lee Bercaw, Jacksonville Sheriff T. K. Waters and Hillsborough County State Attorney Suzy Lopez announced that the authorities had arrested three of the five suspects – Isaiah Chance, Alicia Andrews and Sean Gathright – two days before. It was also publicly announced that the two Murphy cousins were identified and still sought after by the police.

After their arrests, Gathright was charged with two counts of premeditated murder with a firearm, three counts of first-degree attempted premeditated murder with a firearm and tampering with physical evidence. Andrews and Chance were each charged with premeditated first-degree murder with a firearm and conspiracy to commit premeditated first-degree murder with a firearm. The trio pleaded not guilty to the charges on August 26, 2024. District Attorney Lopez also stated that the trio would remain jailed until they would stand trial on a later date for the murder of Foolio.

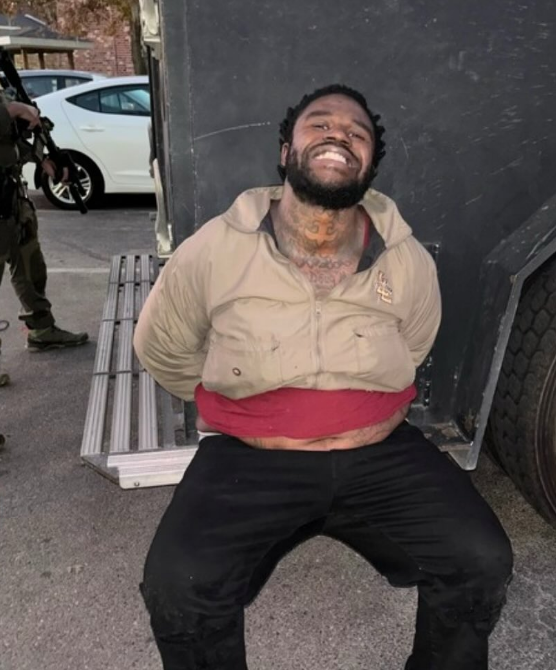
Davion Murphy seen right after his arrest

On July 30, 2024, three days after the capture of the first three suspects, Rashad was the fourth suspect to be arrested for the murder, and he faced a total of four charges: one count of first-degree murder and three counts of attempted first-degree murder. The police continued to search for the last suspect Davion.

In September 2024, the 13th Judicial Circuit State Attorney's Office revealed that they were deliberating whether to seek the death penalty in this case. Under Florida state law, the offence of first-degree murder warrants either life imprisonment without the possibility of parole or the death penalty if found guilty. A month later, in October 2024, the prosecution announced that they would seek the death penalty for Chance, Gathright and Rashad, while in the case of Andrews, the death penalty was taken off the table.

In November 2024, Rashad's defence counsel applied to the courts to allow their client to be evaluated by a forensic neuropsychologist, and they planned to put up an insanity defense against the murder and attempted murder charges preferred against him.

On January 6, 2025, the fifth and final suspect, Davion, was arrested at a local apartment complex in Jacksonville, Florida. He was charged with three counts of attempted first-degree murder, one count of conspiracy to commit first-degree murder and one count of first-degree murder. After his arrest, the prosecution expressed that they would also pursue the death penalty for Davion just like the other three men.

== Trial of Andrews ==
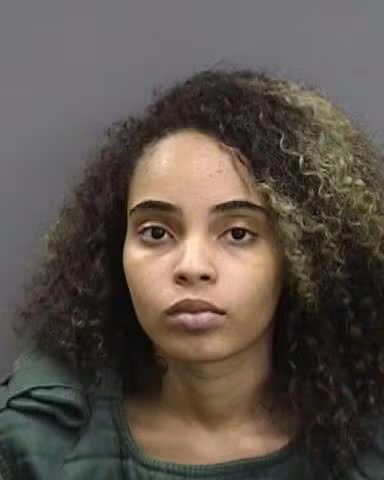
Mugshot of Alicia Andrews

Originally, Alicia Andrews was supposed to stand trial on August 18, 2025, for the murder of Charles Jones, but the trial was postponed to October of the same year after the lead prosecutor of the trial was hospitalized for a medical emergency. On October 20, 2025, Andrews's trial for first-degree murder began at a Tampa local court, and jury selection started on the same day. If convicted as charged, Andrews would receive a mandatory life sentence without parole.

During the trial, the prosecution conceded that Andrews was not a member of any gang, but they submitted that Andrews was complicit in the plot to kill Jones by discussing on the plan with her boyfriend Isaiah Chance and the other three male accomplices, following Jones and getting updates of his whereabouts, and even acted as a lookout when the murder was committed, and she was therefore guilty as charged. The defense argued on the other hand that Andrews knew nothing of the murder plot and that she was merely a follower and simply tagged along with her boyfriend on the morning when Jones was shot, and even stated Andrews was at the mercy of her "controlling and possessive" boyfriend at the time of the killing.

On October 31, 2025, the jury acquitted Andrews of first-degree murder, but found her guilty of a lesser charge of manslaughter. For this lesser offence, Andrews faced a potential jail term of up to 15 years.

Initially, Andrews was scheduled to be sentenced in December 2025. However, her defense counsel appealed that the trial judge, Michelle Sisco, was biased and her behavior allegedly hindered their client from having a fair trial for the killing of Foolio. On January 29, 2026, a new judge, Kimberly Fernandez, was appointed to replace Sisco in Andrew's upcoming sentencing hearing. However, the prosecution is currently appealing against the decision.

On May 11, 2026, Andrews's sentencing was further delayed, after her defence counsel petitioned to the court to overturn Andrews's conviction or grant her a new trial, stating that the alleged misconduct of the original trial judge Sisco shaped the guilty verdict of Andrews's trial and also challenged parts of the evidence used in the trial.

On May 22, 2026, Andrews was sentenced to 15 years in prison.

== Trials of Chance, Gathright and the Murphys ==
=== Trial testimonies and conviction ===
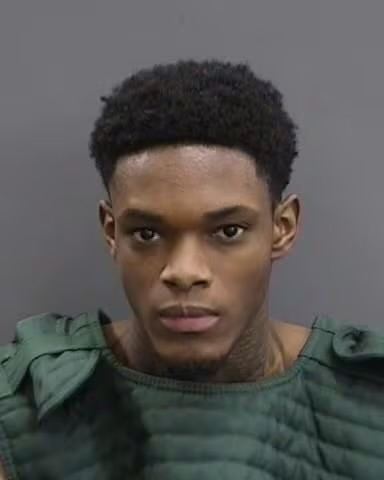
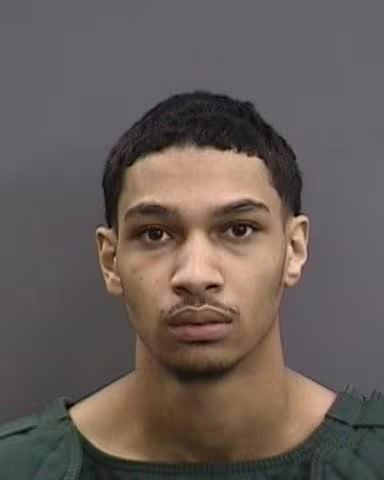
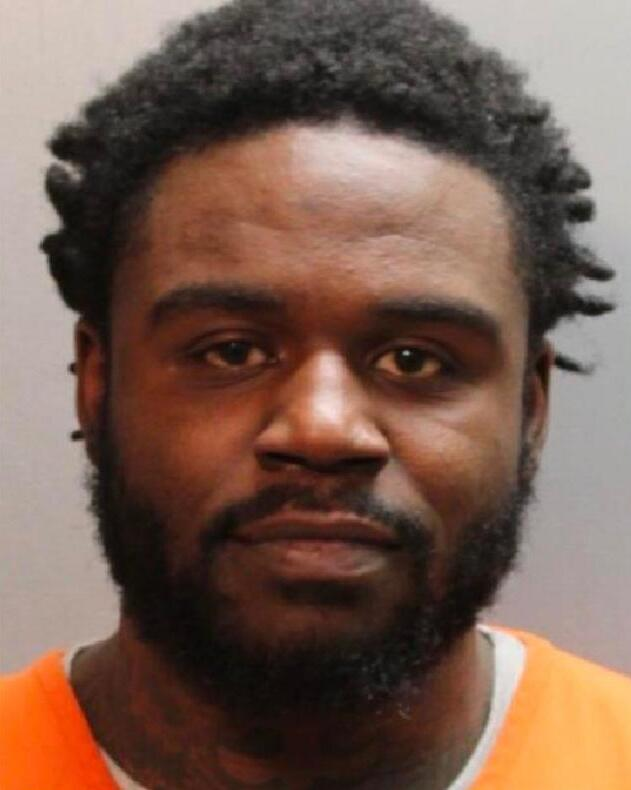
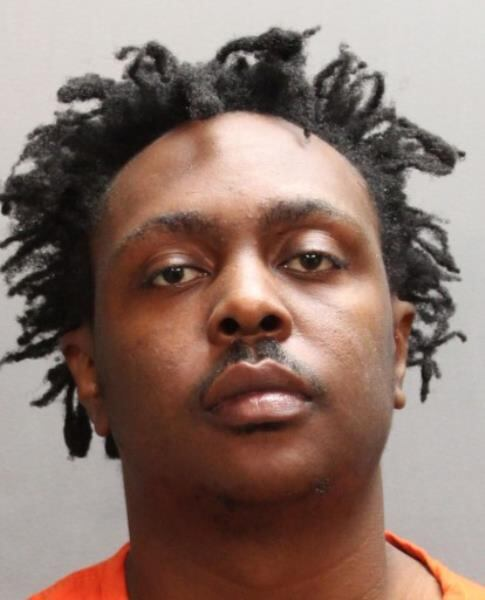
Mugshots of Isaiah Chance (top left), Sean Gathright (top right), Davion Murphy (bottom left) and Rashad Murphy (bottom right)

In March 2026, a month before the four male suspects – Isaiah Chance, Sean Gathright, Rashad Murphy and Davion Murphy – went to trial, all the four men filed motions to seek separate trials before different juries for each of themselves. However, a Hillsborough County circuit judge denied their petitions and ordered all four men to stand trial before the same jury and judge on April 8, 2026.

The trial of the four men began as scheduled on April 8, 2026, and jury selection commenced on that same day.

On April 22, 2026, a 12-member jury was assembled and the four male defendants officially stood trial for the murder of Charles Jones. The prosecution's opening statements were made on that day arguing that there was ample evidence to prove the four men had a common intention to commit the murder itself. During the second day of the trial, the survivors and witnesses of the shooting were summoned to testify in court. Geno Norris, a longtime friend of Jones and one of the people injured in the shooting, stated that he and his friend Xavier Edwards were in the same car with Jones when the gunmen attacked and shot them. Edwards and Norris were wounded, and the latter testified that he and Edwards had to escape the car and seek help. Camia Bentley, the third casualty, stated that she was driving her Nissan to escape the hotel when the shooting happened, and she was grazed by a bullet in her arm.

Christopher Drabek, a Jacksonville police detective, testified that during investigations, they uncovered celebratory posts made hours after the murder of Jones made under a social media account belonging to Rashad. The prosecution contended that Rashad was one of the three shooters and he fired a semi-automatic Glock pistol at Jones, and footage evidence also showed that the gunman wielding the Glock pistol was left-handed. It was noted that Rashad was most likely left-handed because during an interrogation session, Rashad was observed to be struggling to file out a form using his right hand. Rashad also reportedly denied during police questioning that he killed Jones, claiming he was travelling to Tampa with a friend (after recanting his initial denial of ever stepping foot into Tampa). The friend's cell data from his phone showed he never travelled from Jacksonville to Tampa at the time of the murder.

During the sixth day of the trial, the forensic pathologist Noah Reilly testified in court about the victim's cause of death. Several officers of the Jacksonville Sheriff's Office (JSO), including JSO Gang Unit Detective Craig Griffin, JSO Detective Steve Johnson and JSO crime scene detective Summer Dees, testified that they searched Chance's home and both the house and vehicle of Gathright, where they found multiple firearms and ammunition, similar to the ones used during the shooting of Jones. Robert Howard (alias Kenny Caps), a childhood acquaintance of Jones, testified that after the shooting, he received a phone call from Rashad, who reportedly told him that he forgave him. Rashad also reportedly admitted that he was in front of Jones's car when the shooting happened. At that time, Howard was in another car leaving the hotel when he witnessed and heard the shooting.

On May 7, 2026, the prosecution made their closing arguments and sought a guilty verdict for all four men, emphasizing that the defendants were present at the scene of the crime as proven by the cellphone records, CCTV footage and cell site data, which showed them traveling from Jacksonville to Tampa and their location at the time of the murder, and text messages relating to the murder plot, as well as ballistic evidence matching the ammunition found on Gathright's car to the bullet casing found at the murder scene. The defence, however, argued that the evidence against the men was circumstantial and did not directly prove who carried out the shooting.

On May 8, 2026, after eight hours of deliberation, the jury found all four men guilty of first-degree premeditated murder. A sentencing trial was scheduled to take place tentatively from May 11, 2026 until May 15, 2026, and the prosecution intended to pursue the death penalty for all four men.

=== Sentencing hearing ===
The sentencing trial took place as scheduled the following week after the four men's conviction. The prosecution argued that the conduct of the four defendants made them qualify for a potential death sentence, given the fact that the murder of Jones was "cold, calculated and premeditated". Assistant State Attorney Michelle Doherty also brought up the fact that the defendants spent a significant amount of time to meticulously plan and arrange for the execution of their assassination plot, including the preparation of weapons, close communication via phone and messages, and traveling arrangements. The prosecution added that Gathright and the Murphys, whom they identified as the shooters, created a "great risk of death to many persons" by shooting not only Jones but multiple other people (including the three wounded victims of the same attack), and the status of the Murphys and Chance as gang members further made it appropriate to impose the death penalty.

Jones's mother appeared in court on the first day and testified about the loss of her son and emotional impact it had on her, including the pain she felt during birthdays and holidays and family gatherings in her son's absence. She emphasized that her son was more than just a singer featured in social media, and stated Jones was a "son, a human being with a heart, dreams, flaws and people who loved him deeply", and also a brotherly figure, artist and friend who had a future.

During the second day of hearing, Gathright was the first of the four defendants to the stand to testify, and he reportedly expressed remorse for killing Jones and apologized to the family of Jones and the other victims harmed during the shooting, which he described as a "traumatic experience". The defence implored the jury to spare Gathright the death sentence on account that he was led astray by street culture and drugs despite being initially raised in a relatively privileged upbringing by his grandmother, who was his main caregiver while his parents, who were in the military, were deployed overseas. Gathright also testified that he spent his past two years behind bars devoting himself to religion and reading the Bible, and he hoped to rehabilitate and become a mentor to younger people to avoid them from embarking on the same path as him.

On May 15, 2026, the jury recommended that all four defendants should be sentenced to life without parole instead of the death penalty.

On June 22, 2026, all the four male defendants were officially sentenced to life without parole for first-degree murder by Judge Michelle Sisco. Apart from the life sentence for first-degree murder, Chance received a concurrent life sentence for conspiracy to commit murder, while Gathright received four concurrent terms of 30 years for one count of conspiracy to commit murder and three counts of attempted murder, and the Murphys were given four concurrent life terms for the same four charges as Gathright.

== Perpetrators ==
=== Alicia Andrews ===
Alicia Latoya Andrews was born on February 9, 2003. In October 2025, Andrews was convicted of the lesser offense of manslaughter, and was sentenced to 15 years in prison in May 2026.

=== Isaiah Chance ===
Isaiah Jermaine Chance Jr. (Note: News4JAX and First Coast News list him as a Jr., but Tampa.gov and XXL do not.) was born on November 20, 2002. Authorities identified Chance as one of three gunmen involved in the murder. Chance is a known member of the ATK street gang, affiliated with rapper Yungeen Ace.

=== Sean Gathright ===
Sean Andre Gathright was born on October 20, 2005. In court, Gathright expressed how he came from a privileged upbringing, spending part of his childhood in Mississippi with his grandmother, and part of it traveling the world with his parents who were in the military.At the age of 10, Gathright and his parents moved to Jacksonville, where he said that he was first exposed to "street culture, drugs and lying".

=== Davion Murphy ===
Davion Murphy was born on April 19, 1994. Authorities identified Murphy as one of three gunmen involved in the murder. Murphy is a known associate of the street gang 1200. On January 6, 2025, members of JSO's SWAT team and Gang Unit, as well as the U.S. Marshals Service, apprehended Murphy at an apartment on Labelle Street.

=== Rashad Murphy ===
Rashad Murphy was born on January 10, 1997. Authorities identified Murphy as one of three gunmen involved in the murder. Similar to Davion, he is a known member of the 1200 street gang.

== See also ==
- List of assassinations
- Murder of XXXTentacion
- Murder of Tupac Shakur
- Murder of the Notorious B.I.G.
- List of murdered hip-hop musicians
- Crime in Florida
