= San Nicolás de los Garza =

City in Nuevo León, Mexico

San Nicolás de los Garza San Nicolás
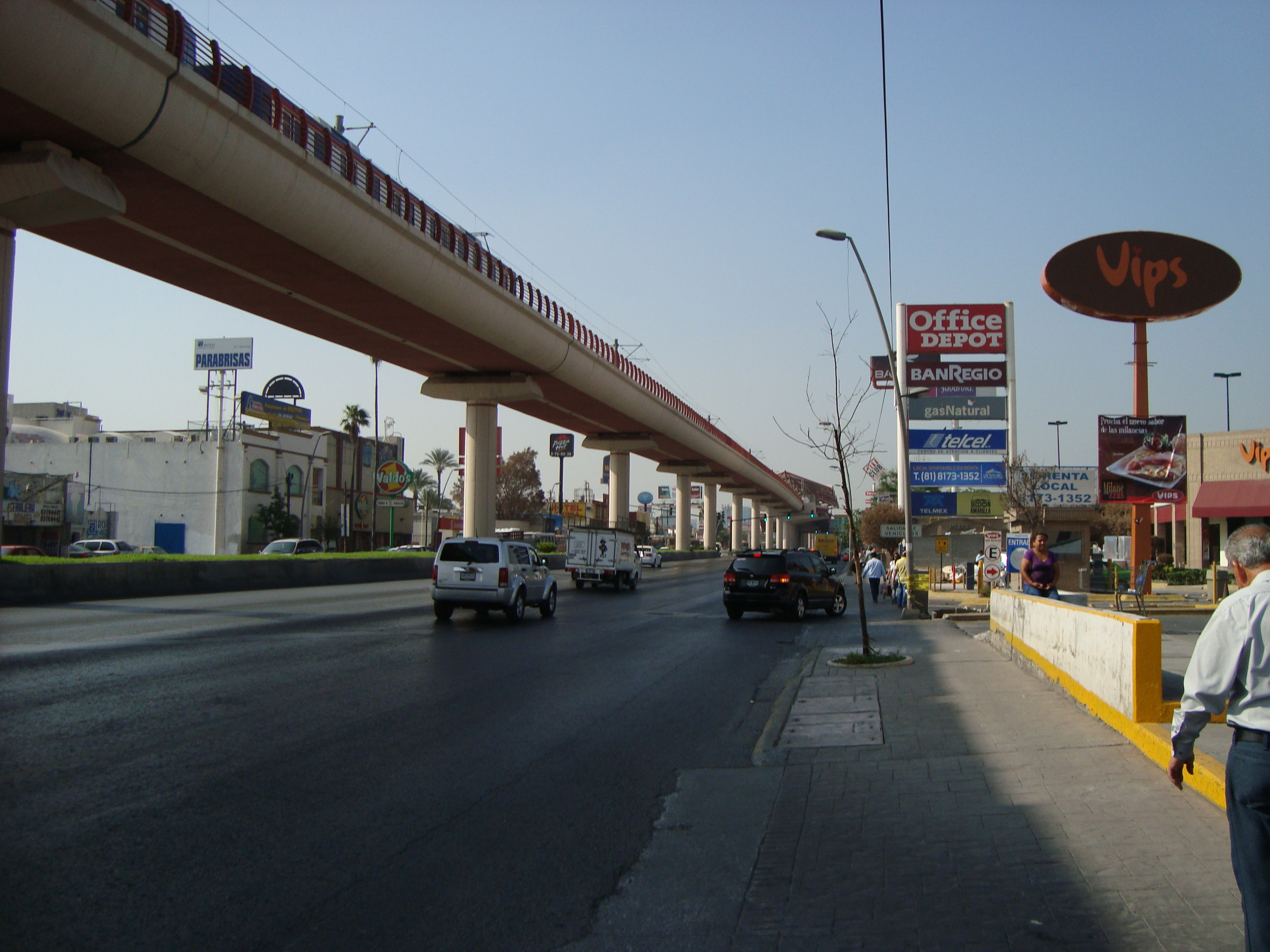
- Avenida Universidad

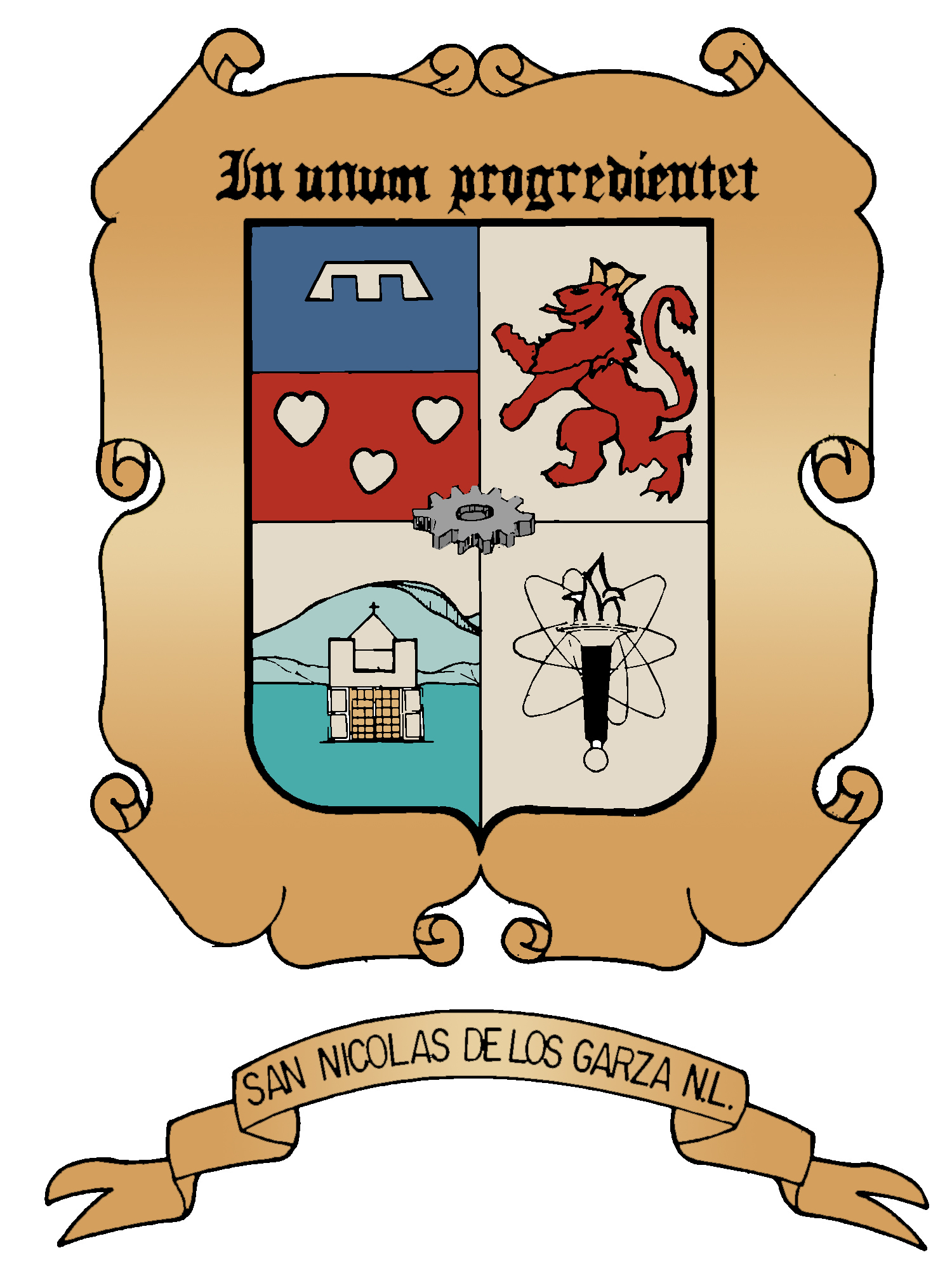
- Coat of arms
- Motto: In Unum Progedientes
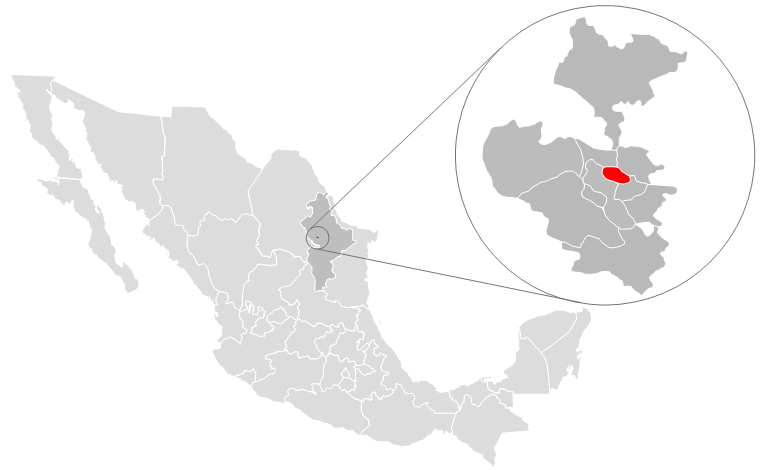
- Location of San Nicolás de la Garza in northern Mexico
- Coordinates: 25°45′N 100°17′W
- Country: Mexico
- State: Nuevo León
- Founded: 5 February 1597

Government
  - Mayor: Daniel Carrillo (PAN)
  - Federal electoral district: Nuevo León's 4th

Area
  - City: 60.14 km^{2} (23.22 sq mi)
- Elevation: 512 m (1,680 ft)

Population (2020 census)
  - City: 412,199
  - Density: 6,854/km^{2} (17,750/sq mi)
  - Metro: 5,341,177
- Time zone: UTC-6 (Zona Centro)
- Postal code: 66400 (Center)
- Website: www.sanicolas.gob.mx

San Nicolás de los Garza, sometimes known only as San Nicolás, is a city and coextensive municipality in the Mexican state of Nuevo León that is part of the Monterrey metropolitan area. It has become primarily a city for residences and family houses, although it still has several factories that tend to relocate to the periphery of the metropolitan area. It is the fifth-largest city in the state, behind Monterrey, Guadalupe, Ciudad Apodaca and General Escobedo.

It houses the Universidad Autónoma de Nuevo León (Autonomous University of Nuevo León), one of the most prestigious public schools in Mexico and Latin America.

San Nicolás, although less populated than Monterrey, has a higher population density.

== History ==
San Nicolás de los Garza was founded on 5 February 1597 and given the name of Estancia de Pedro de la Garza (Pedro de la Garza's Estate), then Estancia de San Nicolás (Saint Nicholas' Estate), and finally Estancia de San Nicolás de los Garza (Saint Nicholas of the Garzas' Estate). The first people that inhabited the terrain were Amerindian, mostly nomads. They were the Alazapas, the Ayalas and the Alincheños.

San Nicolás was founded right after Monterrey, when Diego de Montemayor granted permission to inhabit the area to his secretary, Diego Díaz de Berlanga; Pedro de Iñigo; Domingo Manuel; and D. Pedro de la Garza. The members of these families are considered the first settlers of the city.

Diego Díaz de Berlanga was the person that redacted Monterrey's Foundation Act, and authorized the first land permissions to its first settlers.

In 1830 the area was declared to the category of village, with the name of San Nicolás de los Garza, in honor of the patron saint of the town. On 12 May 1970 it was declared a city.

== Government ==
San Nicolás de los Garza is a municipality governed by a democratically elected Presidente Municipal (Municipal President or Mayor) for three years with no right to reelection. The political environment is one of civility. Since the 1980s, the PAN has remained in office.

The City Council of San Nicolás de los Garza (Cabildo de San Nicolás de los Garza) is an organ integrated by the mayor, the Regidores and the Síndicos. The mayor is the executor of the determinations of the City Council and the person directly in charge of the public municipal administration. The Regidores represent the community and their mission is to collectively define the city policies in all the subjects affecting it. The Síndicos are in charge of watching and legally defend the city interests, as well as in charge of watching the City Treasury status and the municipal patrimony.

The current mayor of San Nicolás is Pedro Salgado Almaguer (PAN), who was elected in the past municipal election and will remain in office until 2016.

The political parties with representation in the city are the Institutional Revolutionary Party or PRI, the National Action Party or PAN, the Party of the Democratic Revolution or PRD, the Labor Party or PT, the Green Party, Convergence, Socialdemocratic Party, and Nueva Alianza.

== Economy ==
In the first part of the 20th century, several important Mexican companies built factories in the municipality, making San Nicolás primarily an industrial center. Companies like Cemex (concrete), Vitro (glass), Peñoles, and Hylsa (steel) were known for their large facilities in the city.

In the 1970s, San Nicolás increased its reputation as a good place to live, and the municipality experienced a tide of house construction. This house construction boom was possible because there were a lot of lands available within the territory of the city. In the 1980s several industrial facilities moved to other municipalities, mainly to Apodaca, which is still within the Monterrey Metropolitan Area, but farther from downtown.

At the end of the 1980s and beginning of the 1990s, huge commercial centers or malls were constructed to serve the large population. The first economic activity became commerce instead of industrial production. The most important malls are La Fe (east), Citadel (east), Las Plazas Outlet (northwest), Plaza Fiesta Anahuac (south), Sendero (North) and Universidad Avenue. The city count with several commercial centers in construction.

== Education ==
The main campus of the UANL, Universidad Autónoma de Nuevo León (Autonomous University of Nuevo León) is located in this municipality. It is the third-largest Mexican university and among the most recognized schools in Mexico, ranked by the Reader's Digest-AC Nielsen Survey 2005 as the top university (both public and private) in the northeast region of Mexico. Its main campus is called Ciudad Universitaria (University City) with an approximate area of 67,630,000 square meters. The UANL system comprises 26 colleges (faculties), 22 post-graduate divisions, 24 high schools (throughout the metropolitan area of Monterrey), one center of bilingual education, and three technical high schools.

== Notable people ==
- Juan Celaya, diver, silver medalist in the 2024 Paris Olympics for synchronized diving
- Adán Zapata, rapper
- Alicia Villarreal, singer
- César Paz Sr., coach of the 1957 Little League World Series champions, held in Williamsport, Pennsylvania, United States.
- Édgar González, pitcher for the Arizona Diamondbacks
- Manuel Uribe Garza, one of the world's fattest men in history

== Sports ==
San Nicolás de los Garza also serves as the home of Tigres UANL, a Liga MX professional football team associated with UANL, whose rivals are C.F. Monterrey. They hosted matches as far as the quarter-finals at the 1986 FIFA World Cup.

== Twin towns – sister cities ==
San Nicolás de los Garza has five sister cities, as designated by Sister Cities International, Inc (SCI):

- Denton, Texas, United States
- Kansas City, Missouri, United States
- Seguin, Texas, United States
- Taipei, Taiwan
- Winnipeg, Manitoba, Canada

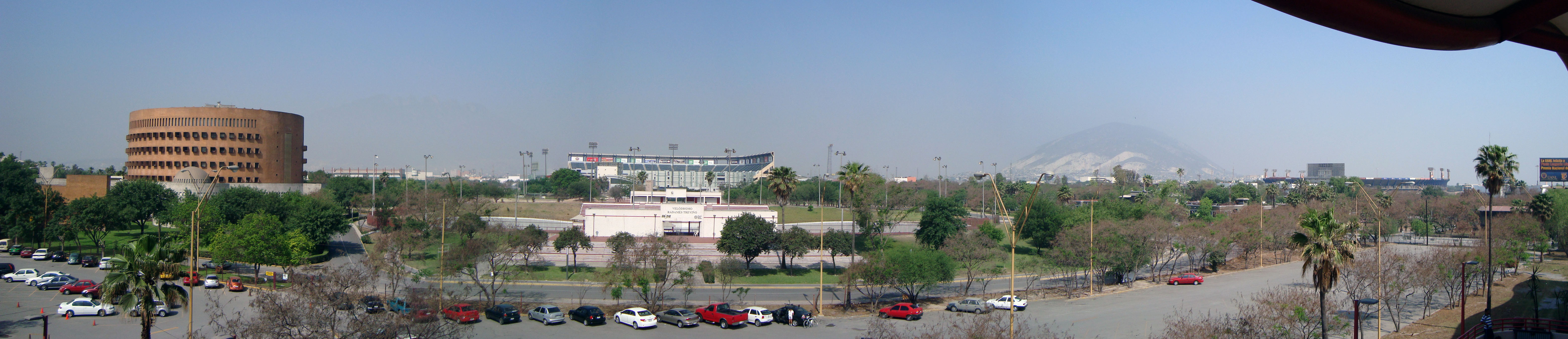
Parque Niños Héroes
