= You Got You =

Single by Elena Baravilala

Single by Elena Baravilala

from the album You Got You - Single
- Released: 22 December 2015
- Recorded: 2015
- Genre: Trance, Pop
- Length: 4:15
- Label: Independent
- Songwriter: Elena Baravilala
- Producers: Pax Ton, DJ Ritendra

Elena Baravilala singles chronology
"In Retrospect" (2015)	"You Got You" (2015)	"Never Enough" (2016)

"You Got You" is an English song written and composed by Fijian singer and songwriter Elena Baravilala, this single was nominated at the 2016 Fiji Performing Rights Association Music Awards and also a hip hop version was produced and released by Elena Baravilala And DJ Ritendra featuring Fijian rapper J.Morrison.

== Background ==
In an Interview released by Fiji Performing Rights Association, Elena Baravilala discuss the song as: "So it was a song that came out last year while I was going through certain circumstances, Being in the public eye, you are always expected to be inspirational and motivational and there is like a consistent pressure from the public on you all the time," Elena Baravilala also shared. "You have to be a certain person to always be the one providing the strength so a lot of the time people can carry on with your strength but they can’t carry your weakness, So at that very moment when you are looking for someone to carry both — your strengths and weaknesses — there was no one there and the only thing I had was the gift of music".

"You Got You (Hiphop Version)"

Single by Elena Baravilala & DJ Ritendra ft. J.Morrison

from the album You Got You (Hiphop Version) - Single
- Released: 23 May 2016
- Recorded: 2015
- Genre: Hip hop
- Length: 5:35
- Label: Lewavesi Production
- Songwriters: Elena Baravilala, J.Morrison
- Producers: DJ Ritendra, J.Morrison, Pax Ton

DJ Ritendra singles chronology
"VITI (Pacific Remix)" (2016)	"You Got You (Hiphop Version)" (2016)	"Misunderstand" (2016)

== Track listing ==
Digital Download
No.	Title	Length
1.	"You Got You"	4:15

Digital Download
No.	Title	Length
1.	"You Got You (Hiphop Version)" (ft. DJ Ritendra & J.Morrison)	5:35

== Music video ==
The Official Music Video of "You Got You" was released on 12 March 2016, The Music Video was filmed and produced by HKAY Photography and it was Directed by Harry Cirimaiwasa and Epi Nasaroa and also Choreography by Jed Taylor.

== Hip-hop version ==
The hip hop version of "You Got You" was released on 23 May 2016 by Elena Baravilala and DJ Ritendra under Lewavesi Production, this version of the track features hardcore raping by Fijian rapper J.Morrison.

== Awards ==
=== Fiji Performing Rights Association Music Awards ===
Year	Category	Result
2016	Best English Song	Nominated
2016	Best Composition	Nominated
