= Misunderstanding =

Misunderstanding may refer to:

- A mistaken or incorrect understanding
- Misunderstanding (2015 film), an Egyptian romantic comedy film
- Misunderstanding (2018 film), a Persian-language film
- "Misunderstanding" (Genesis song)
- Missunderstanding, a song by Al B. Sure!
- "Misunderstandings", an episode of As Time Goes By
- "The Misunderstanding", a song by Orchestral Manoeuvres in the Dark from the album Organisation
- "The Misunderstandings" (The Amazing World of Gumball), an episode of The Amazing World of Gumball
- Major Misunderstanding, a character in the British adult comic Viz
