= Elena Baravilala =

- Also known as: Elena
- Born: Elena Baravilala; September 14, 1988 (age 38); Suva, Fiji
- Origin: Suva, Fiji
- Genres: Pop; RnB; Trance
- Occupations: Singer; Songwriter
- Years active: 2010–present
- Label: Lewavesi Production

Elena Baravilala (also known as Elena) is a Fijian singer-songwriter, Five singles performed by Baravilala, "Fire", "Rain", "You Got You", "Home" And "Seven" were nominated at the Fiji Performing Rights Association Music Awards. From which she has won Best Composition and Music video for "Fire" in 2014 and Best Composition for "Seven" in 2018.

== Collaborations ==
In early 2014, Elena collaborated with Vanuatu Singer Vanessa Quai for her single titled "Angel Over Me". The song was later released in 2014.

In 2017, Elena and Fiji Born composer DJ Ritendra collaborated and came up with the song "Underdogs".

Later the same year she released her new single "Seven" with a music video, a Collaboration with Fijian Singer Pauliasi, this song won her the award for Best Composition at 2018 Fiji Performing Rights Association Music Awards.

== Discography ==
=== Studio albums ===
- In Retrospect (2015)
- Na I DOLE (2017)
- Give Credit To Where Credit Is Due (2017)

=== Singles ===
- Keep on Walking (2010)
- Viti (2011)
- Fire (2013)
- Rain (2014)
- Angel Over Me ft. Vanessa Quai & Davu (2014)
- Here With You ft. Davu (2014)
- In Retrospect (2015)
- Unusual (2015)
- Tinaqu (2015)
- Ke Dau Dredre (2015)
- If Only You Knew (2015)
- You Got You (2015)
- You Got You (Hiphop Version) with DJ Ritendra & J.Morrison (2016)
- Never Enough with Denslao ft DJ Ritendra (2016)
- Home with The Gang (2017)
- We Got Everything ft. DJ Ritendra, Soul Jay, Khazin & Ozlam (2017)
- Seven ft. Pauliasi (2017)
- Underdogs with. DJ Ritendra (2017)

=== Remixes ===
- Viti (Pacific Remix) with DJ Ritendra (2016)

=== Music videos ===
- Keep on Walking (2010)
- Viti (2011)
- Rain (2014)
- You Got You (2016)
- Home with DJ Ritendra (2017)
- Seven ft. Pauliasi (2017)

== Awards and nominations ==
=== Fiji Performing Rights Association Music Awards ===
Year	Recipient	Category	Result
2014	Fire	Best Music Video	Won
2014	Fire	Best Composition	Won
2015	Rain	Best Music Video	Nominated
2016	You Got You	Best English Song	Nominated
2016	You Got You	Best Composition	Nominated
2017	Home (ft. DJ Ritendra)	Most Popular Music Video	Nominated
2018	Seven with Pauliasi	Best Composition	Won

2019 Seven with Pauliasi won the International Achievement Award at the FIPRA Music Awards

== See also ==
- Fiji Performing Rights Association
- You Got You
