= HipHopCanada =

Online publication

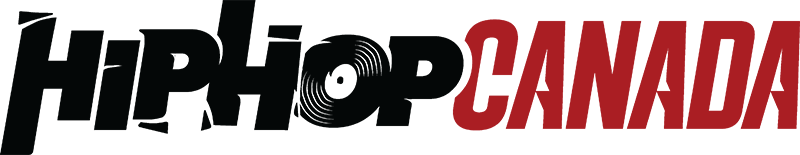
- Website type: Online music publication
- Available in: English
- Country of origin: Canada
- Founder: Jesse Plunkett
- Industry: Canadian hip hop
- Employees: 11-50
- Website: hiphopcanada.com
- Commercial: Yes
- Launched: December 9, 1999; 26 years ago
- Current status: Active

HipHopCanada is a Canadian hip hop and rap online publishing company founded in 1999 by Jesse Plunkett. HipHopCanada claims to be the first sources of news for Canadian hip hop and the largest in the country. It has been nominated 6 times by UMAC for the title of "Best Online Publication" in the Canadian Urban Music Awards and has won the title 4 times. It is considered to be one of Canada's premiere hip hop music media outlets.

== History ==
HipHopCanada was founded in 1999 by Jesse Plunkett at the age of 17 after not being able to find any information about local hip hop music. It is the longest-running and largest source of news for Canadian hip hop. It has been nominated 6 times by Urban Music Association of Canada for the title of "Best Online Publication" in the Canadian Urban Music Awards and has won the title 4 times.

On June 16, 2000, the CRTC awarded one of the frequencies to Milestone, on the company's third attempt. The other frequency was awarded to Aboriginal Voices for a station to serve First Nations communities. At the beginning of this same year, the internet became home to Canada's largest rap/hip hop website publication and community, HipHopCanada. Later in the same year, Weggon Allen was invited to become a partner for HipHopCanada. However, after a difference in opinion over the direction of the company, he moved on to other ventures.

In 2008, HipHopCanada announced the launch of its record label, HipHopCanada Digital, distributed by E1 Music. The first artist signed to the label was Gangis Khan (also known as Camoflauge).

In 2011, it was reported that HipHopCanada raised awareness of OneMatch, the Canadian Blood Services’ registry for bone marrow and stem cell donors. During this time Plunkett had plans to relaunch the company as a non-profit organization with the aim of taking important social causes and bridging them to the hip hop community instead of continuing as a corporation that directs all profits back into the site, however, this was scrapped.

In 2016, HipHopCanada editors were appointed as jurors for the 2016 Polaris Music Prize. The jurors decided Kaytranada's debut album 99.9% as the winner of the prize. The jurors are also regular hosts on the "Polaris Podcast". Editors, including Sarah Sussman, have continued to be a judge for the Polaris Awards.

In 2018, HipHopCanada appointed Maricel Joy Dicion as Managing Editor.

Jesse Plunkett is known for being vocal about issues surrounding the hip hop scene in Canada, and has spoken out on gun violence in relation to the death of Houdini in 2020.

The company rebranded its site in January 2021, as a result of 21 years of service.

== Awards ==
- 2002: UMAC: Canadian Urban Music Awards — Best Online Publication
- 2004: UMAC: Canadian Urban Music Awards — Best Online Publication
- 2005: UMAC: Canadian Urban Music Awards — Best Online Publication
- 2007: UMAC: Canadian Urban Music Awards — Best Online Publication

== See also ==
- Canadian hip hop
- Music of Canada
- 6ixBuzz
- HipHopDX
