= Loose Logic =

American rapper (born 1983)

- Born: Ian Westbrook; June 2, 1983 (age 43)
- Origin: California
- Genres: rap, hip-hop
- Occupations: Rapper, songwriter
- Website: http://www.looselogiconline.com

Ian Westbrook (born June 2, 1983), better known by his stage name Loose Logic, is an American hip hop emcee from California. At his parents insistence he began piano lessons at the age of 8. His career started when the song he recorded as a high school senior, "The O.C. Anthem", was widely downloaded. In 2006 he was nominated as "Best Hip Hop Artist of the Year" by the Orange County Music Awards. He describes his work as "poetry over music".

== Albums ==
- One Story - 2004
- Before The Storm - 2007
- Logistics - 2010
- Perception - 2014
- Reflections - 2017
- Conception - 2022
- Capsized - 2024

== Mixtapes ==
- Never Die Vol.1 - 2007
- Eternal - 2008
- Loosid Dreams - 2010
- Loosid Dreams Vol. 2: Awoken Orbits - 2012
- Loosid Dreams 2.5 - 2015
- The Vault - Cypher Sessions - 2016

== EP's ==
- Open Door Policy EP - 2015

== Collaborative albums ==
- The Vault - 2012 (featuring Kollision, Damon 'Mota' Ortiz, Wez Nilez, et al.)
- The Fraternity: Dark Arts Of The Iron Age - 2017

== Singles ==
- Suit Up - Feat Kenny (Horseshoe Gang) & Irawnic - 2019
- Why Would I? - Feat. Enkay47 - 2019
- Keep It Real - Feat. Coulter - 2019
- Lemme Know - 2021
- Not Responsible - Feat. Be the Knowledge - 2021
- Fuel - Feat. TheRealDeez & KXNG Crooked (beat by Trunxks Beatz) - 2022
