= Hefe Heetroc =

American rapper

- Born: Justin Bacik; August 25, 1976 (age 49)
- Origin: Rochester, NY
- Genres: Rap, Hip-hop, Glitch hop
- Occupations: Rapper, songwriter, producer
- Years active: 2003–present
- Label: KN0-TH30RY WRECK0RDS
- Website: https://hearthis.at/hefe-h33troc/

Justin Bacik (born August 25, 1976), better known as Hefe Heetroc (stylized as HEFE HƏƏTROC) and formerly known as Wez Nilez, is an American rapper from New Mexico. His musical style has been described as a fusion of hip-hop, glitch-hop, and vaporwave, amongst other styles.

He grew up in Rochester, NY, moving to California and then Albuquerque, New Mexico. His musical pursuits began by studying guitar at age 19, and at age 27, he shifted his focus towards hip-hop. He has collaborated with fellow emcee Loose Logic, his music has been featured on numerous blogs such as Thisis50, and his single ‘Space Energy’ has been aired on WRIU FM by Dj Padrino (of the Coke Boys).

== Discography ==
=== As Wez Nilez ===
- Inoculare Mixtape (2011)
- The Inoculation 2 (2012)
- The Inoculation 3 (2012)
- The Vault (2012) - guest feature, hosted by Loose Logic

=== As Hefe Heetroc ===
- Inoculare Intersecting Dimensions (2016)
- Blind Allegiance EP (2017)
- The Shadow Cabal of the 8 Oligarchs (2017)
- The Julie Project (2017)
- Misled Victory Mixtape (2018)
- Empire of the Forgotten (2018)
- Alienz & Conspiracies Boxset (2018)
- Swaggagascar (2019)
- Swaggagascar 2 (2020)
