= Recomeço =

Studio album by Mr. Gângster
- Released: 2013
- Recorded: 2013
- Label: ODI Records / CDC Records
- Producers: Cesar Dreamer, NK, Mr. Gângster

Singles from Recomeço
- 1. "Recomeço" Released: 2012; 2. "Rolé a Noite" Released: 2012

Recomeço is the debut studio album by Brazilian rapper Mr. Gângster, released in 2013, containing the singles "Recomeço" and "Rolé a Noite".

== Background ==
The recording of Recomeço began in 2012 and has the participation of singers Máximos, in the song Rolé a Noite, and Cesar Dreamer, in the song Campeão (Remix). The album's first single was Recomeço, the most successful song of the album, which caused Mr. Gângster to be more widely recognized. The second single from the album, Rolé a Noite, included the participation of Máximos, produced in part from the CDC Records label.

== Track listing ==
No.	Title	Writer(s)	Producer(s)	Length
1.	"Recomeço"	Luíz Paulo Pereira	ODI Records	3:02
2.	"Papel & Caneta"	Luíz Paulo Pereira	ODI Records	2:40
3.	"Gângster (G.A.N.G.S.T.E.R.)"	Luíz Paulo Pereira	ODI Records	4:16
4.	"Campeão [Remix]" (feat. Cesar Dreamer)	Alexsandro Caetano; Luíz P. Pereira	Fluxo Doido Beats / ODI Records	2:36
5.	"Acredito No Que Faço"	Luíz Paulo Pereira	ODI Records	3:00
6.	"Só Olhar e Aprender"	Luíz Paulo Pereira; Rafael R.	ODI Records	3:04
7.	"Rolé a Noite" (feat. Máximos)	Malorn Ian; Luíz Paulo Pereira	CDC Records / ODI Records	3:10
