= Mr. Gângster =

Luiz, o Visitante
- Born: Luiz Paulo Pereira da Silva; July 22, 1995 (age 30); Pernambuco, Brazil
- Genres: Hip hop
- Occupations: Rapper; singer; songwriter; producer; designer
- Years active: 2009–present
- Label: Capela Records
- Website: mrgangsteroficial.com

Luiz, o Visitante is the stage name of Luiz Paulo Pereira da Silva (born July 22, 1995), a Brazilian rapper, singer, songwriter, producer and designer. He has recorded one album, and became known for his songs "Recomeço" and "Rolé a Noite".

== History ==
Born and raised in Pernambuco, in Recife, he began making his first compositions at age 13, but started his career as a singer in 2009. it became producer for self-produce it, and the time has come professionalizing his musical work. In 2012, Luiz, o Visitante released his first single, titled "Recomeço", which would mean a new phase of his career with the hit. He was recognized in Brazil, and was considered one of the leading names in the Rap Pernambuco. In the same year, he released his second single titled "Rolé a Noite" with special guest singer miner, "Máximos". In 2013, he released his debut album, also titled "Recomeço", his first single led to the album title.

== Discography ==
- 2013: Recomeço
- 2014: Feito em Marte

=== Singles ===
- 2012: "Recomeço"
- 2012: "Rolé a Noite (feat. Máximos)"
- 2010: "Quem Sou? (feat. Big Ralf)"
- 2013: "Martelo dos Deuses (feat. Big Ralf)"
