= Princess Vitarah =

American rapper (born 1997)

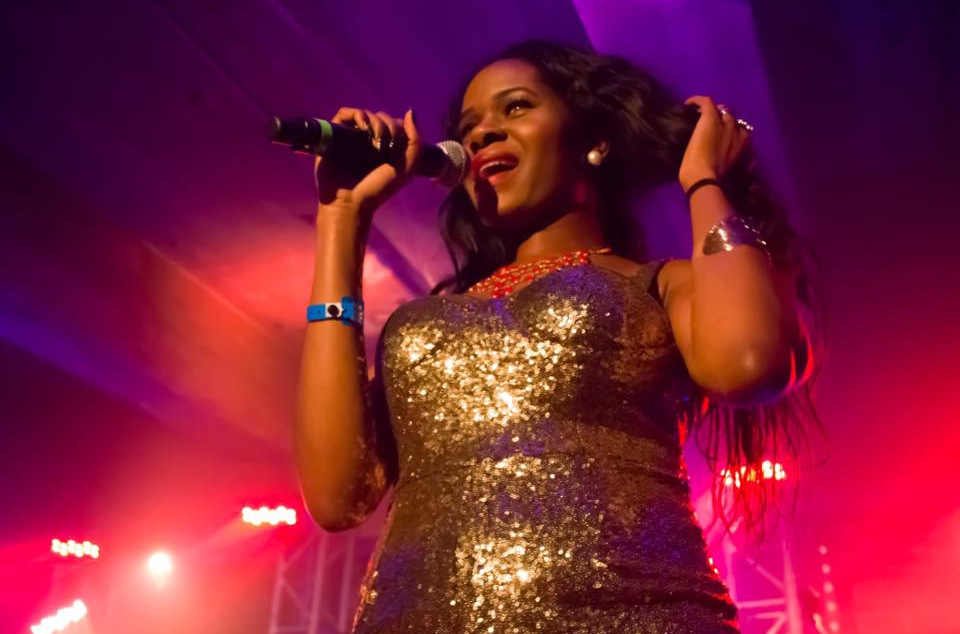
- Princess Vitarah in 2016

Background information
- Born: September 25, 1997 (age 28)
- Genres: Hip hop, Rap
- Occupations: Rapper; Singer; Songwriter
- Instrument: Vocals
- Years active: 2016–2024

Princess Vitarah (born September 25, 1997) is a Nigerian-American rapper, singer, and songwriter.

== Early life ==
Princess Vitarah was born in the United States, but raised in Nigeria. In the summer of 2015, she moved back to the United States to pursue a career in music.

== Career ==
Princess Vitarah began her career by releasing music through the internet in early 2016. She earned public recognition after her song, "Nigerian Pussy" went viral on video sharing sites such as YouTube and Facebook, receiving 4 million views in the first day alone. She has been featured in many prominent publications including Vice, The Fader, and XXL. In 2021 she announced a move away from her previous sexualised image. As of June 2024, her entire music catalog has been removed from all music streaming platforms. Her Instagram account and YouTube channel have also been deleted.
