= Lil Darius =

- Born: Darius Thornton; February 19, 2005 (age 21); Athens, Georgia, U.S.
- Origin: Athens, Georgia, U.S.
- Genres: Hip hop
- Occupations: Rapper, songwriter, YouTuber
- Years active: 2021–present
- Website: www.lildarius.com

Darius Thornton (born February 19, 2005), known professionally as Lil Darius, is an American rapper from Athens, Georgia.

== Early life ==
Johnson was born and raised in Athens, Georgia.

== Career ==
Johnson's career began when he was 16 years old. After signing a management deal with IGM in 2021, he released his first video "Mud Brothers" with Slimelife Shawty in December, followed by the album Gift of the Ghetto. In mid-2022, he dropped a song called "Feelin Like Rylo". In December 2023, Johnson released the song "Didn’t Come To Play" with Quavo.

== Discography ==
Albums/EPs

Title	Artist	Year	Label	Producer
Yung N turnt	Lil Darius	2022	Encore Recordings	Alex Goose, Charlie J. Perry, Chase & Status (and 8 more)
Gift of the Ghetto	Lil Darius	2021	Encore Recordings	Joice, Josh Crocker, y/Sir
17	Lil Darius	2020	Encore Recordings	Pip Millett, Josh Crocker, Charlie Perry, Lester Duval
Small Town Hero	Lil Darius	2022	Encore Recordings	Josh Crocker

=== Singles ===
- Mud Brothers (feat. Slimelife Shawty)
- Pipe It Up (feat. 21 Lil Harold)
- Focus (feat. Lil ManMan)
- Day 1's (feat. Jhacari)
- Feelin like Rylo
- Skrt Vroom
- Roll Royce Umbrella
- Pressure
- Shine
- Small Town Hero
- Murder (feat. Anti Tha Menace)
- Regular
- Chosen
- Me Vs. Me
- Murder 2.0 (feat. Anti The Menace)
- Penthouse
- Mhm
- Neighborhood Trapstars (feat. Peezy)
- Rubi Wayda (feat. Luh Tyler)
- Pimpin Ain’t Easy
- Dog Shit
- Luh Tyler Flow
- Been Turnt
- Lamborghini Boys (feat. Nardo Wick)
- Mean’t 4 You
- About Us
- Didn't Come To Play (feat. Quavo)
