= Music of the Netherlands =

The Netherlands has multiple musical traditions. Contemporary Dutch popular music is heavily influenced by music styles that emerged in the 1950s, in the United Kingdom and United States. The style is sung in both Dutch and English. Some of the latter exponents, such as Golden Earring and Shocking Blue, have attained worldwide fame.

Sometimes partly based and raised upon the tradition of Indorock, new acts with a mixture of Mainstream pop music, Dance, Jazz, Funk and Soul emerged in the mid-1980s. Many of them were and still are performing in and/or outside The Netherlands, and some of them gained (international) recognition, which would sometimes also result in a collaboration with major players from the United States or United Kingdom. An early example of these is Massada, a band with strong Moluccan roots, in the tradition of Santana. Some of the most successful artists among them were Mai Tai, Lois Lane, working with Prince, Julya Lo'ko, and saxophone player Candy Dulfer, also working with Prince, Dave Stewart and Pink Floyd. The mid-1990s saw the rise of Total Touch, with singer Trijntje Oosterhuis.

Another popular genre of Dutch music is known as "Levenslied", meaning "Song of/about life". These songs have catchy, simple rhythms and melodies, and are always built up on choruses and verses. Themes are often sentimental and include love, death and loneliness. Traditional Dutch musical instruments such as the accordion and the barrel organ are essential to levenslied, though in recent years many levenslied artists also use synthesizers and guitars. Artists in this genre include Koos Alberts and the late André Hazes and Willy Alberti.

Dutch techno, hardstyle, gabber, trance and other styles in electronic dance music (EDM) spread globally. Many DJs in the EDM scene hail from the Netherlands, including Tiësto, Don Diablo, Armin van Buuren, Ferry Corsten, Sander van Doorn, Fedde le Grand, Hardwell, Showtek, Afrojack, Oliver Heldens, Ran-D, and Martin Garrix, all of whom consistently rank in the DJ Mag Top 100 DJs and other rankings. The Amsterdam Dance Event is an electronic music conference and one of the biggest conferences for the many electronic subgenres.

Hip-hop in the Dutch language (nederhop) has exploded since 2000 in the Netherlands and is also popular in Belgium. Songs like "Traag", "Europapa", "Coño", and "Cartier" reached an international audience, and are to date the most streamed Dutch-language songs on Spotify, with around 125 to 150 million total streams per song.

== Classical and contemporary classical music ==
Jan Pieterszoon Sweelinck (May 1562 – October 16, 1621) was a Dutch composer, organist, and pedagogue whose work straddled the end of the Renaissance and beginning of the Baroque eras. Sweelinck was a master improviser, and acquired the informal title of the "Orpheus of Amsterdam". Over 70 keyboard works of his have survived, and many of them may be similar to the improvisations that residents of Amsterdam around 1600 were likely to have heard. Even his vocal music, which is more conservative than his keyboard writing, shows a striking rhythmic complexity and an unusual richness of contrapuntal devices.

His influence was international. Some of his music appears in the Fitzwilliam Virginal Book, which otherwise mainly contains the work of English composers. Sweelinck wrote variations on John Dowland's internationally famous Lachrimae Pavane, and John Bull, the English keyboard composer, wrote a set of variations on a theme of Sweelinck, indicating the close connection between the different schools of composition across the North Sea.

Jacob van Eyck (ca. 1590–1657) was a blind recorder and organ virtuoso, who composed a unique collection of flute music.

Unico Wilhelm van Wassenaer (1692–1766) was an accomplished baroque composer, whose work Concerti Armonici erroneously was attributed to Giovanni Battista Pergolesi. Igor Stravinsky used Unico's music for Pulcinella.

Alphons Diepenbrock (September 2, 1862 – April 5, 1921) created a musical idiom which, in a highly personal manner, combined 16th-century polyphony with Wagnerian chromaticism, to which in later years was added the impressionistic refinement that he encountered in Debussy's music.

Willem Pijper (1894–1947) is generally considered one of the most important figures in modern Dutch music. Between 1918 and 1922 he grew into one of the more advanced composers in Europe. In each successive work he went a step further and, from 1919, Pijper's music can be described as atonal. However, Pijper remained a composer of strong emotional character, to which his Third Symphony (1926) bears witness. In Pijper's later works the harmonic expression seems at times to approach monotonality. As a teacher Pijper had a great influence on modern Dutch music, teaching many prominent Dutch composers of the 1950s, 60s, and 70s. He was senior master of instrumentation in the Amsterdam Conservatoire, and from 1930 until his death in 1947 he was Head of the Rotterdam Conservatoire.

Ton de Leeuw (born Rotterdam, 16 November 1926 - died Paris, 31 May 1996) is known for his experiments with microtonality. He wrote one opera, Antigone (1990–1991).

Lex van Delden (1919–1988) and Simeon ten Holt (1923–2012) were important composers.

Louis Andriessen (June 6, 1939 – July 1, 2021) was a composer whose early works show experimentation with various contemporary trends: postwar serialism (Series, 1958), pastiche (Anachronie I, 1966–67), and tape (Il Duce, 1973). Andriessen's mature music combines the influences of Stravinsky and American minimalism. His harmonic writing eschews the consonant modality of much minimalism, preferring postwar European dissonance, often crystallised into large blocks of sound. Large-scale pieces such as De Staat ['Republic'] (1972–76), for example, were influenced by the energy of the big band music of Count Basie and Stan Kenton and the repetitive procedures of Steve Reich, both combined with bright, clashing dissonances. Andriessen's music is thus anti-Germanic and anti-Romantic, and marks a departure from postwar European serialism and its offshoots. He also played a role in providing alternatives to traditional performance practice techniques, often specifying forceful, rhythmic articulations, and amplified, non-vibrato, singing. Other notable works include Workers Union (1975), a melodically indeterminate piece "for any loud sounding group of instruments"; Mausoleum (1979) for two baritones and large ensemble; De Tijd ['Time'] (1979–81) for female singers and ensemble; De Snelheid ['Velocity'] (1982–83), for three amplified ensembles; De Materie ['Matter'] (1984–88) a large four part work for voices and ensemble; collaborations with filmmaker and librettist Peter Greenaway on the film M is for Man, Music, Mozart and the operas Rosa: A Horse Drama (1994) and Writing to Vermeer (1998); and the recent La Passione (2000–02) for female voice and ensemble.

Significant composers after Andriessen include Klaas de Vries (born 1944), Jacob Ter Veldhuis, a.k.a. JacobTV (b. 1951), Guus Janssen (b. 1951) and Cornelis de Bondt (b. 1953).

== Folk ==
Dutch folk music, is characterized by simple straightforward bass motives heavily supplemented with fast, often happy, melody. (Click here for an example.) Uncommon among other European folk, in Dutch music the bass line, not the melody, is the musical line that is danced to. This means that though the music itself may sound fast, the dances are usually quite moderate to slow in tempo. The dances themselves are mainly group dances rather than individual or dual dances. Clogs are often worn during dances; however, Dutch clog dancing is very different from its more modern counterpart. It is virtually impossible to perform highly active dances with Dutch clogs (which are entirely made from wood, not just the sole) and hence the clogs function as additional percussion, by stamping rhythmically.

"Lang zal hij leven", a Dutch folk song.

In the early 19th century, rural Dutch folk began moving to cities like Amsterdam and Rotterdam, bringing with them folk traditions. Many of their songs and dances, however, began to dwindle in popularity. In the early part of the 20th century, however, a number of urban intellectuals travelled to the countrysides to record with local musicians, a process paralleled in other European countries, such as Spain.

In the 1970s, the Netherlands underwent a roots revival, led by artists like Gerard van Maasakkers, Jos Koning, Dommelvolk and RK Veulpoepers BV, Fungus and Wolverlei. Many of the folk songs performed by these musicians was collected by Cobi Schreijer and Ate Doornbosch, the latter of whom broadcast them on his radio program Onder de groene linde (Under the green lime).

It was in about 1974 that the Dutch folk revival peaked, a year marked by the first recording of Fungus and the birth of Wargaren from the band Pitchwheel.

The mainstream popularity of the Dutch roots revival was short-lived, but it continued in Friesland, where a handful of groups, starting with Irolt in the mid-1970s, sang in the West Frisian language. Frisian folk music has survived thus, aided in part by the Aaipop Festival in Nylân and annual festival in Joure. At Joure's festival, established in 1955, participants dress in 19th century-style clothes and perform traditional music and dance like the skotsploech ensembles.

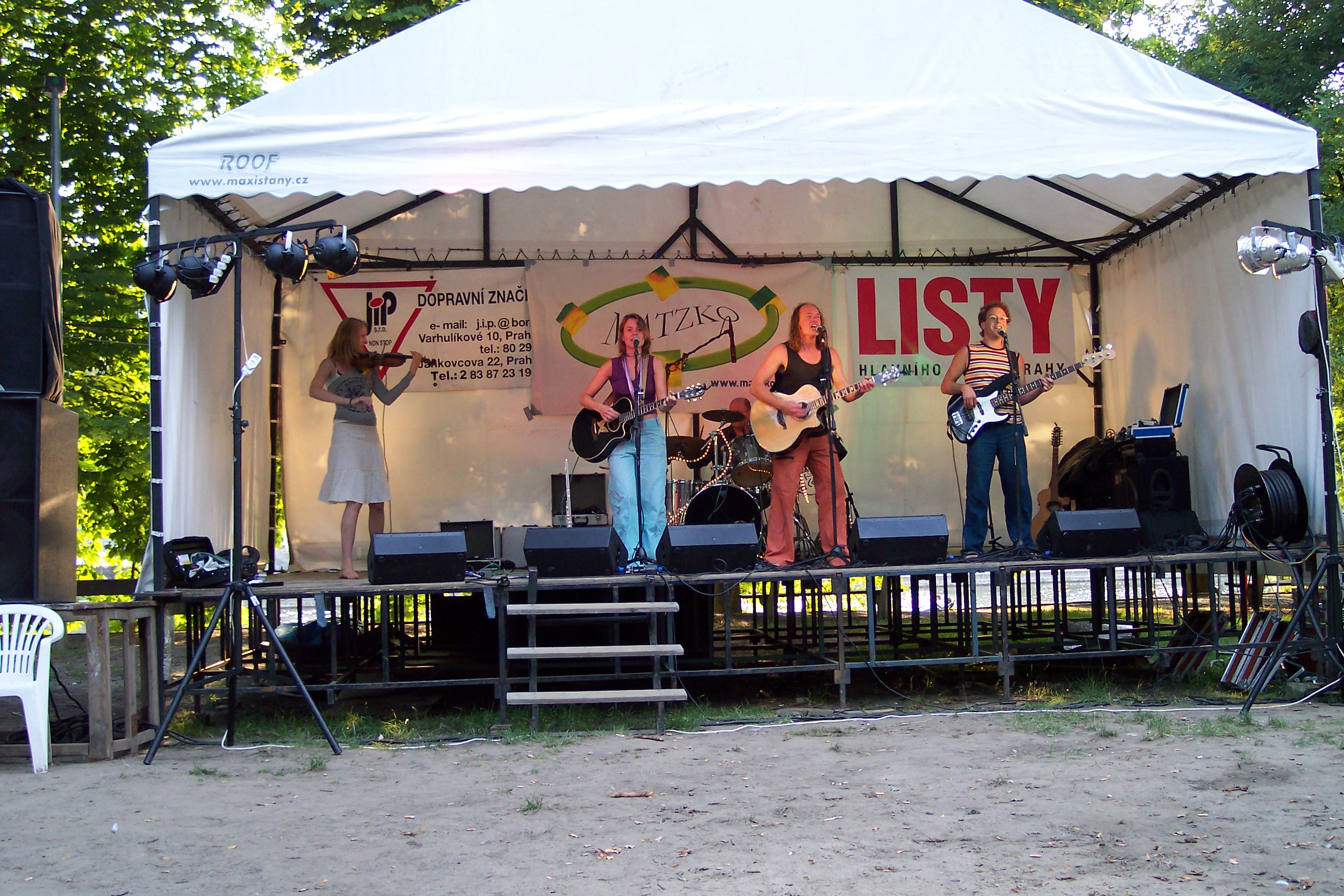
Dutch folk-rock group Matzko performing on an island in the river Vltava in Prague in the summer of 2005.

Modern revivalists include the Groningen band Törf, Folkcorn, Pekel and Twee Violen en een Bas, Lirio, Dubius, Mus, Matzko, Wè-nun Henk.

Moluccan-Dutch musicians like Tala Mena Siwa and the Moluccan Moods Orchestra have had some success with pop-based Moluccan music, while kaseko, a style from the former Dutch colony of Suriname, has also seen mainstream popularity, primarily due to musicians like William Souvenir and Carlo Jones.

== Jazz ==
The North Sea Jazz Festival attracts artists from international acclaim.

Misha Mengelberg (June 5, 1935 - March 3, 2017) was a jazz pianist and composer. He was the pianist on Eric Dolphy's last album, Last Date (1964). Also featuring on that record was the drummer Han Bennink, and together with Piet Noordijk they formed a quartet which had a number of different bassists. They played at the Newport Jazz Festival in 1966. In 1967 he co-founded the Instant Composers Pool, an organisation which promoted avant garde Dutch jazz performances and recordings, with Han Bennink and Willem Breuker.

Mengelberg played with a large variety of musicians. He often performed in a duo with compatriot Bennink, and with other musicians including Derek Bailey, Peter Brötzmann, Evan Parker, Anthony Braxton.

Han Bennink (born April 17, 1942) is a jazz drummer, percussionist and multi-instrumentalist. Through the 1960s he drummed with a number of American musicians visiting the Netherlands, including Dexter Gordon, Sonny Rollins and Eric Dolphy. He subsequently became a central figure in the emerging European free improvisation (or free jazz) scene. From the late 1960s he played in a trio with saxophonist Peter Brötzmann and Belgian pianist Fred Van Hove, which became a duo after Van Hove's departure in 1976. Through much of the 1990s he played in Clusone 3 (also known as the Clusone Trio), a trio with saxophonist and clarinetist Michael Moore and cellist Ernst Reijseger. He has often played duos with Mengelberg and collaborated with him alongside other musicians.

As well as playing with these long-standing groups, Bennink has performed and recorded solo (such as Tempo Comodo (1982)) and played with many free improvisation and free jazz musicians including Derek Bailey, Conny Bauer, Don Cherry and Alexander von Schlippenbach, as well as more conventional jazz musicians.

Willem Breuker (November 4, 1944 – July 23, 2010) was a jazz bandleader, composer, arranger, saxophonist, and bass clarinetist. Since 1974 he led the 10-piece Willem Breuker Kollektief, which performed jazz in a theatrical and often unconventional manner, drawing elements from theater and vaudeville.

== Pop music in the Dutch language ==
Many Dutch artists have become popular by singing songs in their own language. It started with Peter Koelewijn in the late 1950s, the first to sing Rock and Roll in Dutch. In the 1960s it was mainly Boudewijn de Groot - to this day extremely popular. In the 1970s there were many performers, of which Rob de Nijs stood out. The 1980s were for André Hazes and less Koos Alberts. The 1990s were dominated by Marco Borsato. Other well-known names throughout the years were Jan Smit, Frans Bauer, Gerard Joling, Gordon, Guus Meeuwis and René Froger. Another notable Dutch band is Tambourine.

In addition, there is a great number of bands that compose and perform pop and rock songs in the Dutch language. That started in the 1970s with Polle Eduard, Bots and Normaal - which sang in dialect. Late 70s and early 80s there was a big boom of bands that used the Dutch-speaking songs. Well known representatives from that period: Doe Maar, Het Goede Doel, Frank Boeijen Groep and Toontje Lager, and during the late 80s De Dijk, The Scene and Tröckener Kecks. In the 1990s, there was a second boom of the genre in Acda en de Munnik, Bløf, Van Dik Hout and IOS.

== Rock and pop music ==
Pioneers of Dutch rock were the so-called Indorock bands from the late 1950s, like The Tielman Brothers and the Blue Diamonds. They played rock guitar instrumentals at a time when white Dutch musicians did not perform rock 'n' roll. They stemmed from the Indo community in The Hague, which was also the center of the succeeding genre Nederbeat when Dutch musicians formed bands influenced by British beat groups and rock music. It earned that city the title of Beatstad ('Beat city') in later years. With 60s bands like Golden Earring and Shocking Blue, and Kane and Anouk in the 1990s, The Hague became synonymous for mainstream rock.

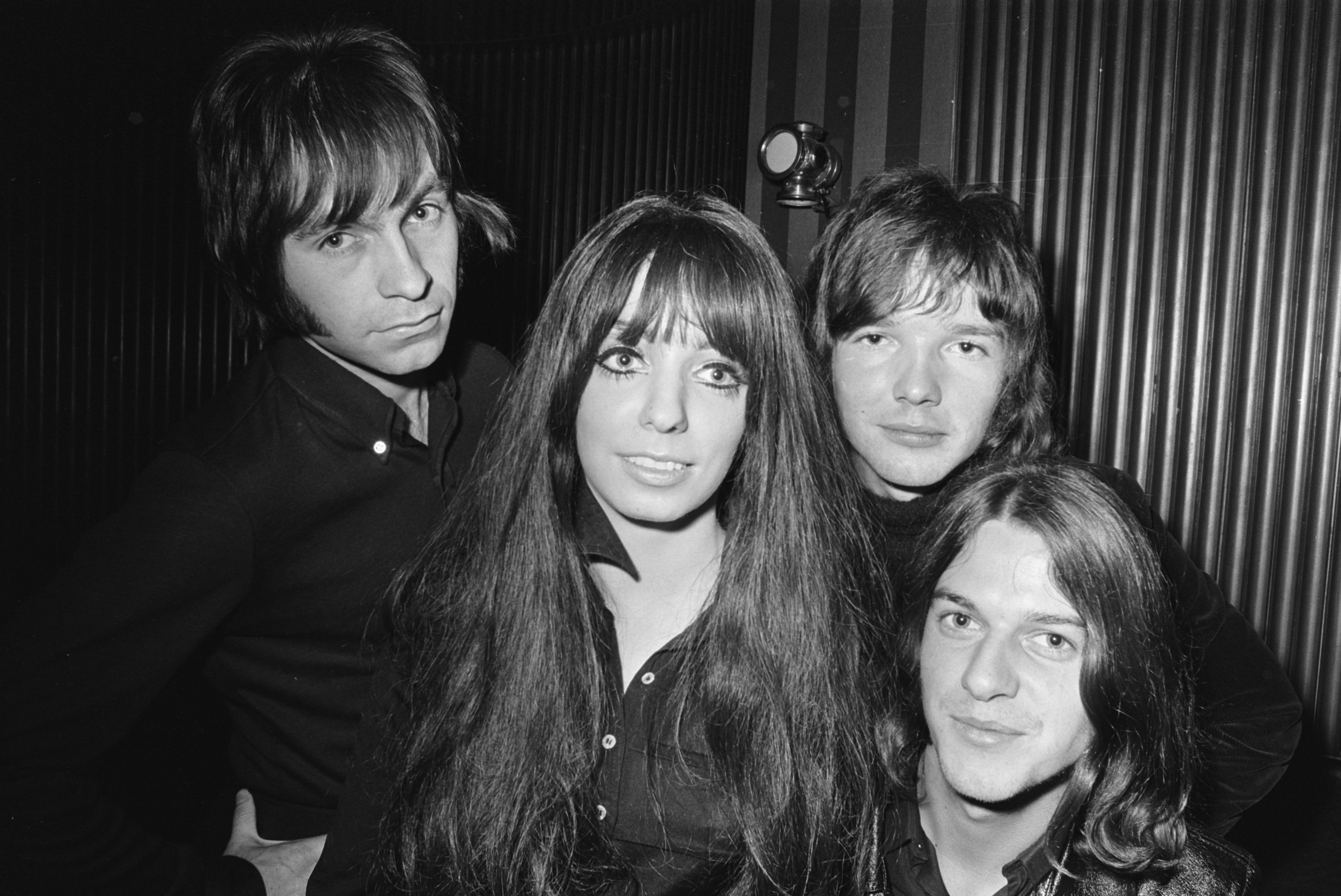
Shocking Blue in 1970

More progressive music emerged in the 1960s in Amsterdam. In 1964 (see 1964 in music), The Outsiders were the first Dutch psychedelic rock band to become successful. Well known was the 'Haagse Scene' - many of the popular bands of the 60s came from The Hague, such as Shocking Blue, which topped the US charts in 1970 with "Venus", Golden Earring, Q65, The Motions, Earth & Fire. Other representatives from this period: the Cats, Tee-Set, Bintangs, Sandy Coast, Cuby & the Blizzards and Brainbox. George Baker acquired international fame with the songs Little Green Bag (1969), and "Una Paloma Blanca" (1975).

From the late 1960s the post-war generation gained political influence. Many state subsidized rock venues opened all over the country. These clubs, like Amsterdam's Paradiso and Melkweg, were stepping stones for many alternative rock bands on their first European tour and the Dutch crowd stayed well informed about new British and American acts.

In the 1970s some artists stood out. Herman Brood became the country's ultimate rock 'n roll icon. He even scored a hit in the US with "Saturday Night", and subsequently became the epitome of the "rock'n'roll junkie" he often sang about. He had been in the media spotlight until his suicide in 2001. Other bands from the 70s include Pussycat (lead singer Toni Willé), whose song Mississippi hit the charts at number one in Netherlands in 1975 and many other countries including UK in 1976, Gruppo Sportivo, Massada, Vitesse, Solution, the Nits, Focus and still Golden Earring with their greatest hit ever: "Radar Love", also Top 10 in the US.

The band Teach-In is best known for winning the Eurovision Song Contest 1975 with their song "Ding-A-Dong". The band was founded in 1969 and parted in 1980. Throughout this time there were several changes in lineup.

The late 70s and early 80s gave rise to many one-hit wonders and some bands that lasted for longer. Girl groups Luv' and Dolly Dots but also disco bands Spargo and Time Bandits were among the most successful, alongside the Golden Earring, which scored some of their biggest hits with "Radar Love", "Twilight Zone' and "When The Lady Smiles". The Nits developed a large audience outside the Netherlands, including Finland, Switzerland, Germany, France, Belgium, Greece and Canada and in 1989 were the first Dutch band to play in the (then still) Soviet Union. Urban Dance Squad was a cross-over band, combining hip-hop with funk and rock. The band's minor American success proved to be influential. Their music style (rapcore) influenced bands like Rage Against the Machine. Van Halen was created by Edward Van Halen who was of Dutch heritage.

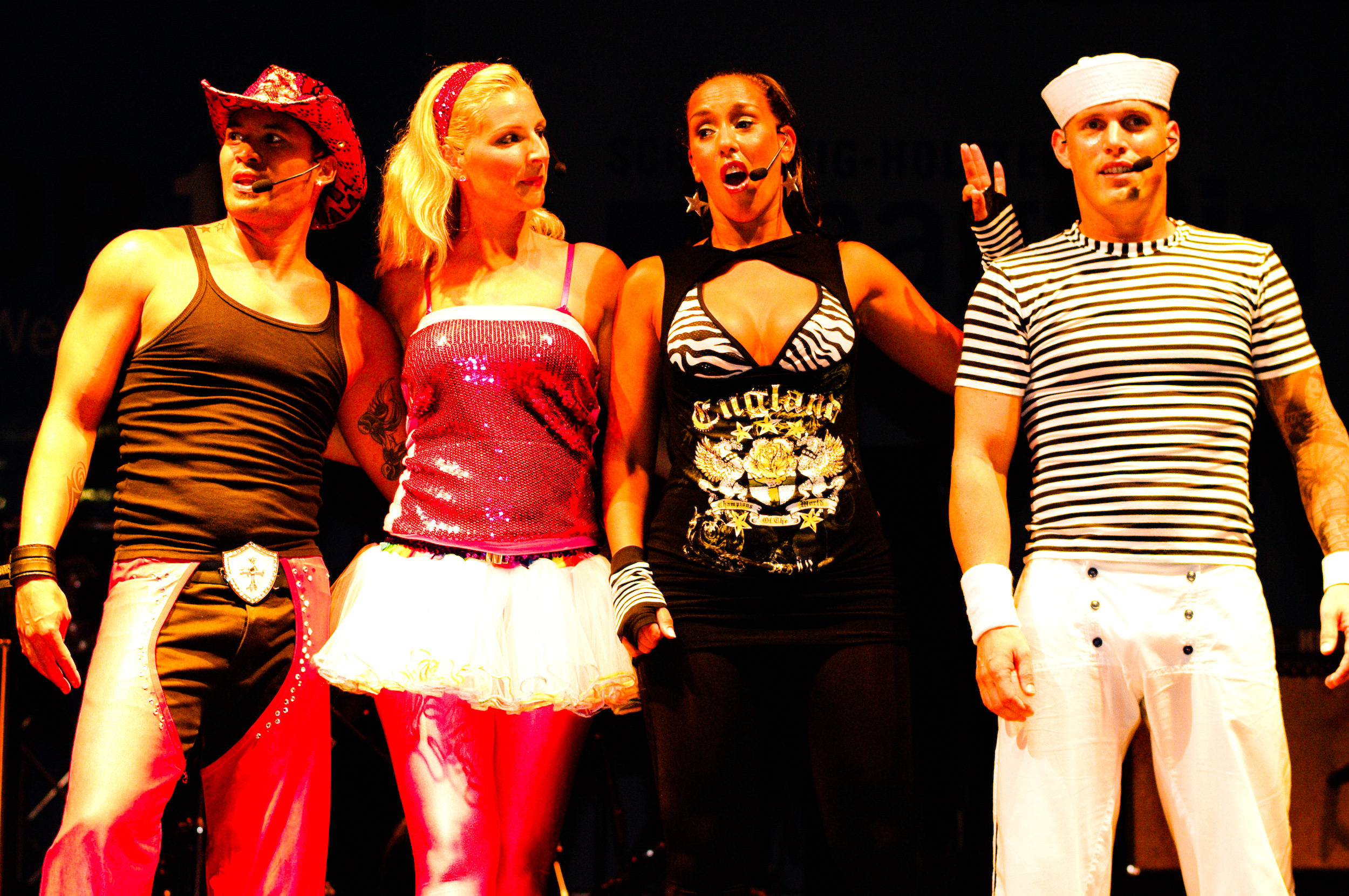
Vengaboys in 2009

The 1990s made international hits courtesy of 2 Unlimited, 2 Brothers on the 4th Floor, and Vengaboys. However, the 1990s was also the start of the DJ-era. Ferry Corsten, Tiësto, Armin van Buuren, DJ Jean and Bart Claessen started their careers in the 1990s and became the stars of their era.

Dutch bands in the 2000s are Intwine, The Sheer, Naked Shepherd, Krezip, Di-rect and Johan.

Originally a semi-finalist in the fifth season of The Voice of Holland, singer-songwriter Duncan Laurence went on to win the Eurovision Song Contest 2019 with his song "Arcade", thereby granting the country its first Eurovision win since Teach-In in 1975. "Arcade" later became a sleeper hit by early 2021 and also entered the top 30 of the US Billboard Hot 100, thus allowing Laurence to join the list of a few Dutch pop acts to score a hit in the US.

Current pop acts include Esmée Denters, Anouk, Sharon Doorson, Davina Michelle, Maan, Nielson, Eva Simons, Ilse DeLange, Toni Willé (Pussycat), Celine Cairo and Belgian-Dutch girl group K3.

=== Hard rock ===
Brothers and founding members of Van Halen, lead guitarist Edward van Halen and drummer Alex van Halen, are from the Netherlands - both born in Amsterdam in the mid-1950s and raised in Nijmegen - before moving to the United States in 1962.

=== Punk rock ===
Ivy Green was among the first punk bands, originating from Hazerswoude.

Tedje en de Flikkers, a group of homosexuals ("flikkers" is Dutch for "faggots") from Nijmegen, was one of the most infamous punk formation of the Netherlands. They sprang from the left wing and gay movements that thrived in Nijmegen during the 1970s and 1980s. Their provocative performances (politically more than musically) often literally resulted in orgies of sex, drugs and noise. They existed only for three years (1977–1980).

The Ex is an Amsterdam group of musicians making something that could be called punk. De Heideroosjes is also a well-known Dutch punk rock group, singing in Dutch, English, German and Limburgish.

=== Boerenrock ===
Some bands create a kind of rock music sometimes called "Boerenrock" ('farmers rock'). These bands mix rock and pop music with regional influences, sometimes sung in one of the regional dialects, and lyrics influenced by life in rural areas. Examples include BZB (Band Zonder Banaan) and WC Experience from North Brabant, Normaal and Jovink en de Voederbietels from Gelderland who sing in Dutch Low Saxon, Rowwen Hèze and Neet Oét Lottum from Limburg who sing in Limburgish, Mooi Wark from Drenthe who also sing in Dutch Low Saxon and Jitiizer from Friesland who sing in West-Frisian.

Musically, the music played by such bands can be described as a rowdy, straightforward style of rock music, inspired by bands such as ZZ Top, Motörhead, AC/DC and Creedence Clearwater Revival. At other times, influences from pop music and folk music (for instance the case with Rowwen Hèze) can be heard.

Not rarely, these bands display a lot of humorous elements in their repertoire, lyrics and live performances. An example is the repertoire of the WC Experience, which contains cover songs from bands such as Queen, Guns N' Roses and Madness, only the lyrics are replaced by different, rather silly lyrics in their own dialect. Also, the name of 'Band Zonder Banaan' means "Band without a Banana", and is a humorous play on the name of a famous Dutch pop-band, BZN (Band Zonder Naam, or 'Band Without a Name'). The name "Jovink en de Voederbietels" is a contraction of the names of the two founding band members (Hendrik Jan Lovink en Gijs Jolink), and "voederbietel" is a humorous contraction of the Dutch Low Saxon word for sugar beets (used as food for horses) and the name of the world-famous British popband The Beatles, of which they used a number of songs in which they replaced the lyrics for Achterhooks ones.

Boerenrock bands tend to perform at local festivities and concerts in big tents in rural areas, rather than in concert halls in bigger cities. An event where a lot of Boerenrock music can be heard, and a famous event amongst Boerenrock bands and fans, is the annual Zwarte Cross Festival ('Black Motocross'), which is organized by members of Jovink en de Voederbietels. The event is a mixture of several motocross related activities and a rock festival.

=== Indie rock ===
In the 1990s, indie rock band Bettie Serveert was formed and independent record label Excelsior Recordings released albums of Dutch indie rock bands like Caesar, Ghost Trucker, Alamo Race Track, Johan, Spinvis, Gem, Bauer, Daryll-Ann, zZz and many others. After 2000 Voicst was formed and became popular after a beer commercial hit single for Heineken. After leaving Zoppo and forming Avec-A musician Yuri Landman received international attention as an experimental luthier for famous experimental rock bands. Dutch noise rock acts are The Ex, Gone Bald, The Moi Non Plus, Adept, Bonne Aparte, Feverdream. Post-rock acts include We vs Death, Electropunk: Aux Raus. The indie music scene is mainly present in Amsterdam, Rotterdam, the Hague, Groningen and Utrecht. A cross media platform called Subbacultcha! hosts nights in venues where many international touring avant garde rockbands like Health, Enon, Miracle Fortress, Mahjongg, These Are Powers, Pre perform as well as local indie and noise rock acts like The Moi Non Plus, Bonne Aparte, Adept, Hospital Bombers, Pfaff. Subbacultcha! also publishes a musical magazine with in depth interviews with the touring bands and arranges instant recording sessions in a studio in the Vondelpark with those bands. In the Hague, the State-X New Forms takes place annually in Paard van Troje.

== Heavy metal ==
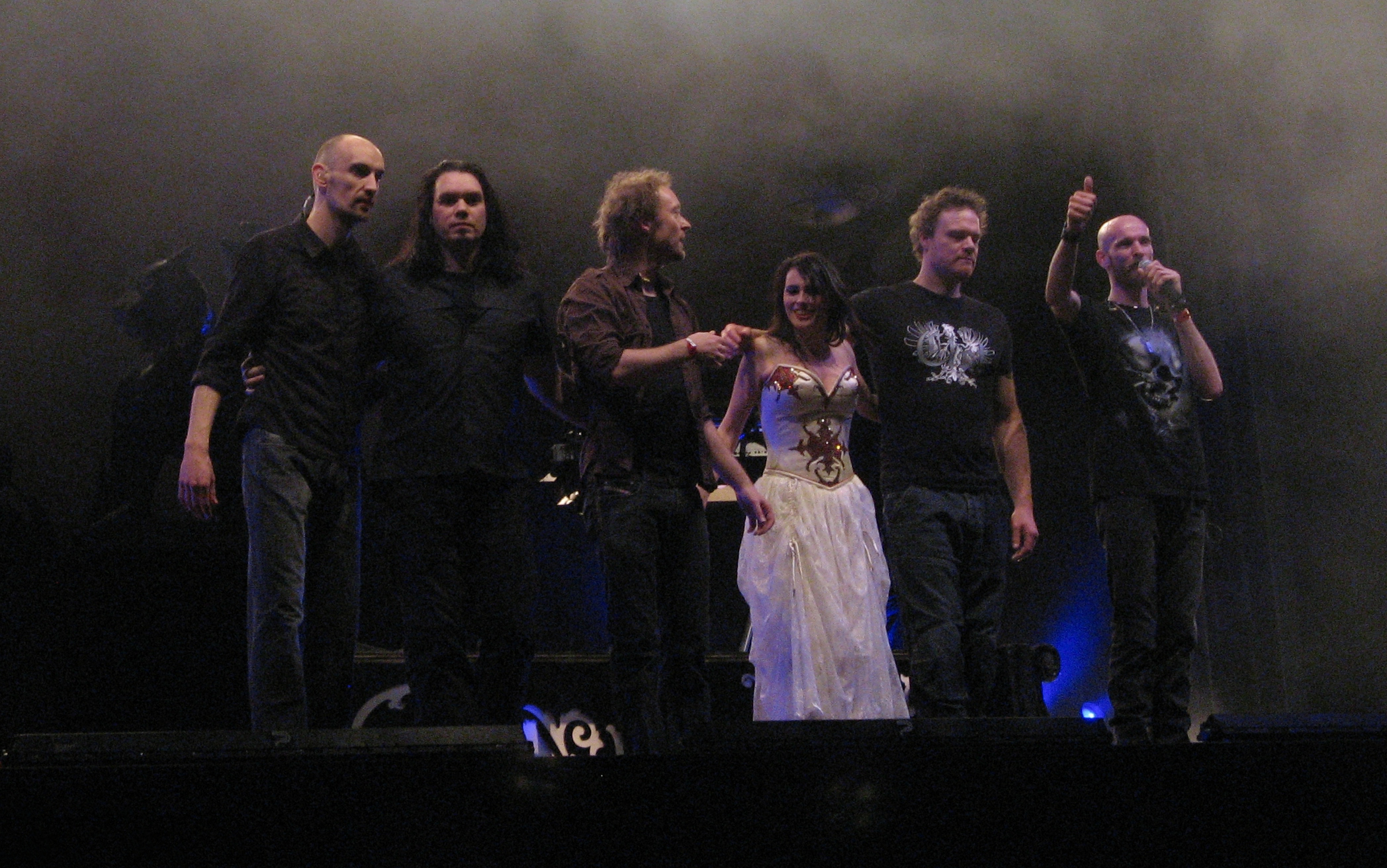
Within Temptation in 2008

=== Symphonic metal ===
The Netherlands are also known for symphonic metal bands such as Within Temptation, The Gathering, Stream of Passion, After Forever, Delain and Epica. They became successful in the late 1990s and in the beginning of the new millennium. However, bands like Supersister and Kayak (who had a hit with Ruthless Queen) were already internationally successful in the 1970s. In the 1980s Vandenberg was internationally successful.

==== Progressive metal ====
Unique progressive metal music is composed by Arjen Anthony Lucassen. From the long list of his projects, Ayreon is the most famous. Arjen's music is characterised by distinct vocals, storyline concepts and the wide spectrum of musical instruments used.

=== Extreme metal ===
==== Death metal ====
Similarly, in the last decade of the previous century a more extreme variety of metal, death metal, has had some success. Starting in the late 1980s and early 1990s, bands like Pestilence, Sinister, Asphyx, Altar, Centurian, Gorefest, and God Dethroned gained popularity both inside and outside of Europe. At the present, bands like Pyaemia, Disavowed, Prostitute Disfigurement, Hail of Bullets, The Monolith Deathcult, Inhume, Callenish Circle, Rompeprop, Legion of the Damned, MaYaN and Severe Torture enjoy a similar status.

==== Black metal ====
Several black metal bands have risen to prominence from the Netherlands recently. Carach Angren, Cirith Gorgor, Israthoum, Dodecahedron, Ordo Draconis, Funeral Winds, Lugubre, Slechtvalk and Urfaust are some of the best-known. Israeli group Melechesh have also made the Netherlands their permanent base of operations. Viking/folk metal band Heidevolk are also gaining popularity.

==== Doom metal ====
Dutch doom metal bands include Officium Triste, Deinonychus, The Gathering and to a certain extent Asphyx.

== Experimental ==
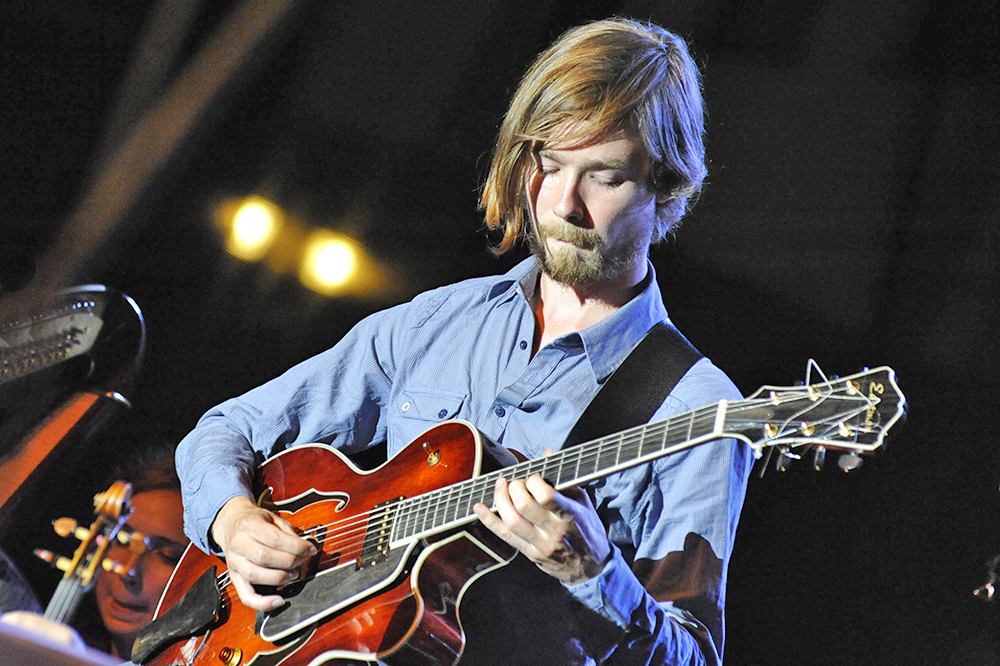
Dutch guitar player Bram Stadhouders on stage with the World Orchestra project in Warsaw, Poland - July 2010.

The Dutch musical culture has a small experimental music scene with a few artists that tour international such as Machinefabriek, solo projects of members of The Ex, Toktek, Gijs Gieskes, Knalpot, Yuri Landman, Jaap Blonk, Wessel Westerveld, Wouter van Veldhoven, Michiel van de Weerthof, Bram Stadhouders, his brother Jasper Stadhouders, Lukas Simonis and Michel Banabila . Also Pierre Bastien lives and works in The Netherlands, although not strongly connected to the Dutch scene. Venues like WORM in Rotterdam, Extrapool in Nijmegen and STEIM, OT301 and Mediamatic in Amsterdam are the main venues for this musical niche.

== Electronic music ==
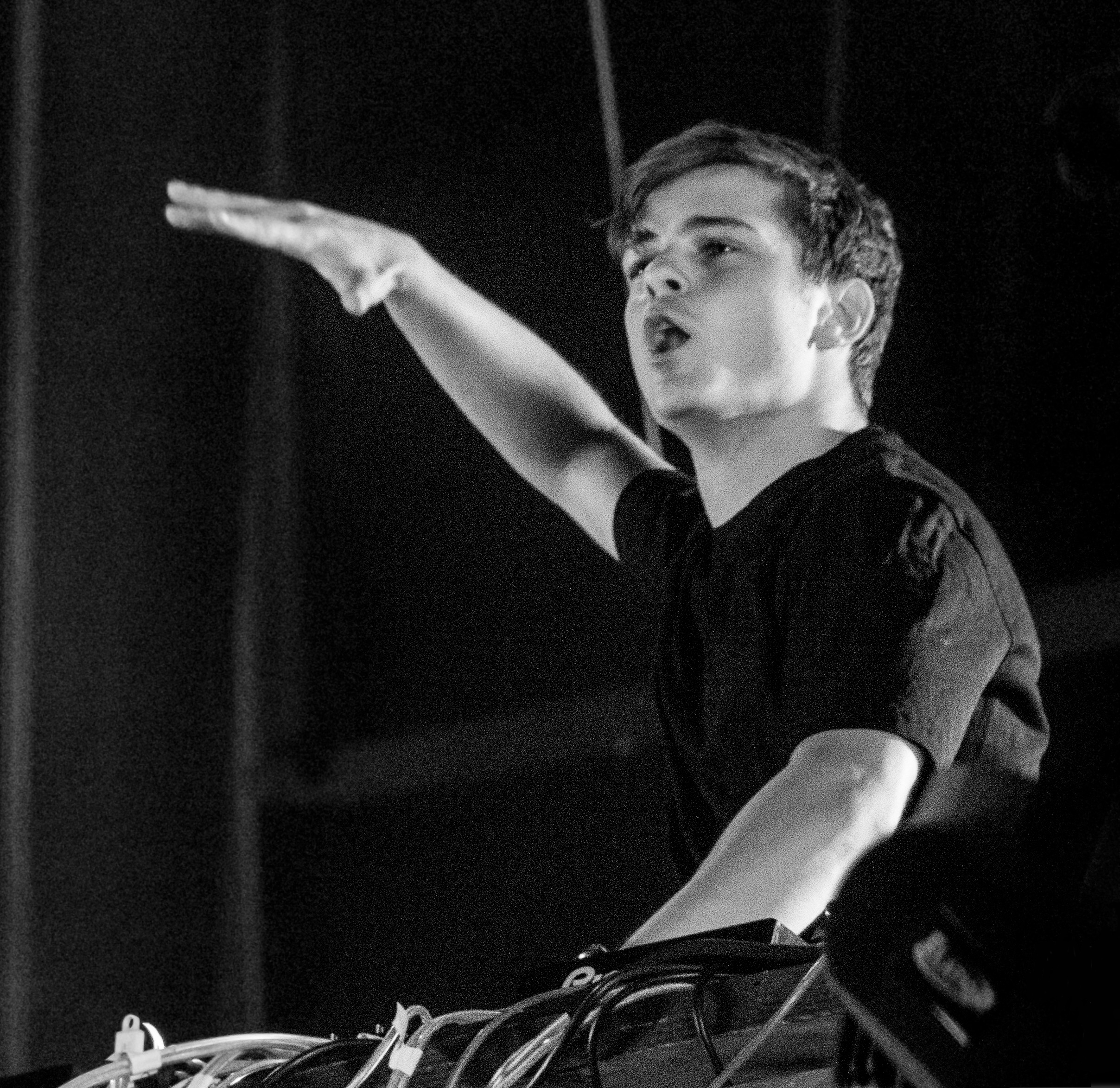
Martin Garrix in 2016

In the early 1990s, Dutch DJs developed a style of electronic dance music called gabber. The style was developed in reaction to the commercialization of house music and was heavily influenced by early hardcore from Frankfurt and New York City. The DJs stripped the music of what they perceived as excess sounds, songs were reduced to a high-speed monotonous beat, of sometimes over 260 beats per minute. The first ever record to be labeled gabber was "Amsterdam waar lech dat dan?" by Rotterdam-based 'The Euromasters' as a reaction to the media always focusing on Amsterdam. It has to be said that Amsterdam-based D-Shake was probably to be the first to use the term gabber in a 1990 Dutch TV program. Important gabber groups and DJs are the Rotterdam Terror Corps, The Dark Raver and Neophyte. Gabbers distinguish themselves through hair (bald heads) and clothes (Australian and Cavello). Now, gabber is usually called early hardcore. Gabber also spawned happy hardcore, an offshoot of gabber and Breakbeat Hardcore, a genre of dance music that originated in the UK. Important groups and DJs in happy hardcore include Charly Lownoise and Mental Theo, Party Animals and Flamman & Abraxas.

The Netherlands has also spawned many Eurodance acts, such as 2 Unlimited, Alice Deejay, Vengaboys, 2 Brothers on the 4th Floor and Twenty 4 Seven. Many of the world's top trance DJs are Dutch, such as Armin van Buuren, Ferry Corsten and Tiësto. The DJ Mag Top 10 has been dominated by the Dutch for many years. In 2012, five of the 10 DJs were Dutch. Tiësto has been awarded best DJ three times in a row by DJ Mag and is still present in the top 10. Armin van Buuren then took over first place, subsequently doing this for four years in a row. Many foreign DJs also live in and operate from the Netherlands. Drum and bass is also popular in the Netherlands, with notable artists including Noisia and Black Sun Empire. The Netherlands is also home to many of the largest trance events on earth, including Sensation and Trance Energy.

Other popular DJs from the Netherlands include Afrojack, Hardwell, Laidback Luke, Fedde le Grand, Nicky Romero, Dash Berlin, D-Block & S-te-Fan, DJ Isaac, Wildstylez, Headhunterz, Brennan Heart, Sander van Doorn, W&W, Ummet Ozcan, R3HAB, Yellow Claw, Ran-D and Martin Garrix.

The Dutch have through the years also made a reputation for themselves with their underground scene. A multitude of small independent record labels, event organizations and artists have cropped up through the years. Artists such as Speedy J, the Acid Junkies, Orlando Voorn, Miss Djax, Unit Moebius, and I-F have all gained international recognition, paving the way for several new electronic artists from the Lowlands.

== Hip hop ==
Several Dutch groups have played an important role in the development of rap and hiphop in the Netherlands. The Urban Dance Squad, led by Rude Boy (who later also played with Junkie XL), produced an original mix of rock and rap, laying the foundation for the nu metal hype of the late 1990s and early 2000s. Def La Desh and the Fresh Witness, led by Wendy Wright, brought rap with vocals to the forefront, with groups like TLC following. The Osdorp Posse were the founders of Dutch language rap, or nederhop. Their frontman, Def P (Pascal Griffioen), switched from English to Dutch in 1988, which made him one of the first to rap in Dutch commercially. That year, Def P, IJsblok, King and Seda formed the Osdorp Posse. Over the years, they explored all sides of hiphop, from poetic hiphop to politically engaged hiphop. They introduced several Anglicisms in the Dutch language, such as moederneuker ("motherfucker"). Before Osdorp Posse, Rotterdam-based rapper Def Rhymz and other members of Bad Boys Posse had already used the Dutch language for raps during underground concerts. Other important Dutch rappers are The Opposites, De Jeugd van Tegenwoordig, Pete Philly and Perquisite, Extince, Kempi, Brainpower, Opgezwolle, Spookrijders, Snelle, Polderkartel, Typhoon, and Def Rhymz. Currently, Nicolay is one of the leading hip hop producers to come out of the region.

From 2000 onwards, Dutch hiphop has exploded and is dominating the charts. An overview of the most streamed Dutch-language songs on Spotify as of March 11, 2026, shows that all but three listings are nederhop songs:

Spotify streams (million)	Song	Artist(s)	Release year
202	Traag	Bizzey, Jozo and Kraantje Pappie	2017
209	Europapa	Joost Klein	2024
151	Coño	Puri, Jhorrmountain and Adje	2017
150	Duurt te lang	Davina Michelle	2018
144	Cartier	Dopebwoy ft. Chivv and 3robi	2017
130	Oceaan	Racoon	2012
126	Hoe het danst	Marco Borsato and Davina Michelle	2019
131	Drank & Drugs	Lil' Kleine and Ronnie Flex	2015
118	Sterrenstof	De Jeugd van Tegenwoordig	2010
111	Hij is van mij	Kris Kross Amsterdam, Maan, Tabitha, Bizzey	2018

== See also ==
- Culture of the Netherlands
- Netherlands in the Eurovision Song Contest
- Music of Bonaire and Curaçao
- Music of Belgium
- Amsterdam Andalusian Orchestra
