= Andy Tielman =

Dutch Indo musician (1936–2011)

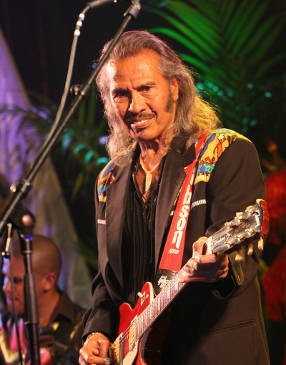

Andy Tielman (30 May 1936 – 10 November 2011) was an influential Indo (Eurasian) artist, recognised as the "godfather" of Indorock, the style of rock and roll played by Indo artists in the 1950s and 1960s. He is considered one of the most important figures in Dutch popular music, and "defied the notion that early rock and roll was a phenomenon of white and black musicians from America".

He was known for his wide vocal range (5 octaves) and virtuoso guitar playing as well as his showmanship. Many Dutch musicians, including Jan Akkerman, Barry Hay, and Herman Brood have cited him as major influences.

Tielman is credited with releasing the first Dutch rock and roll single, in 1958, and led the first Dutch rock band with international appeal, the Tielman Brothers, in a career that spanned seven decades, from the mid-1950s to his death in 2011. During Tielman's heyday in the 1950s and 1960s, the Tielman Brothers were hailed as the best live act in Europe and received the highest fees. In 2005 he was awarded a Royal decoration in the Order of Orange Nassau. In 2011 Tielman died of gastric cancer.

== Dutch East Indies ==
Andy Tielman was born in Makassar, Celebes, Dutch East Indies on 30 May 1936. Both his father, a KNIL captain named Herman Tielman, and his mother, Flora Laurentine Hess, were Indo-European. Aside from Andy, the couple had 5 children: Reggy, Phonton, Loulou (Lawrence), and Jane (Janette Loraine). When the Japanese invaded the Indies, the elder Tielman was imprisoned; Andy and his siblings were taken care of by his mother. He later recalled "When war came the world was broken. My whole world just fell apart."

After the Japanese surrendered in 1945, the family was reunited. By that time, Andy and his siblings were performing jazz standards at private functions using the musical training their father had given them. Within half a year they were performing throughout nascent Indonesia, which had proclaimed its independence after the Japanese surrender. The siblings' repertoire included both American and traditional Indonesian music.

By the time the Netherlands formally recognised Indonesia's independence in 1949, the Tielman siblings had become a household name; they even performed for President Sukarno at his palace in Jakarta. In 1951 they were introduced to the song "Guitar Boogie" by Arthur "Guitar Boogie" Smith. In an interview Tielman recalled: "This was the first song which my brothers and I converted into rock 'n roll by adding drums to it." The band began playing rock and roll music by Les Paul, Elvis Presley, Little Richard, Bill Haley, Fats Domino, Chuck Berry and Gene Vincent. Aside from the family band, Andy also played with Dolf de Vries' band The Starlights in Jakarta, as well as Freddy Wehner's Hawaiian band in Sumatra.

In the late 1950s anti-Dutch rules and regulations increased, leading up to an escalation of the Dutch New Guinea conflict; it was feared that the Bersiap violence would be repeated. Dutch businesses and other properties were seized, Dutch social services were stopped, Dutch schools were banned and the last Dutch nationals were expelled. Anti-Dutch sentiments also affected Indo celebrities, including the Tielman siblings, and when they were pressured into forgoing their Dutch nationality the family repatriated to the Netherlands.

== Europe ==
In 1957 the Tielman family moved to the Netherlands, first to a boarding house in Breda and later to The Hague. Their initial years in the Netherlands were difficult. Tielman later recalled that their first boarding house was "really sad" and said that music was the only thing that kept them going. The siblings, who required new instruments, went into a music shop to replace Andy's broken guitar. The owner forbade him to touch anything, until the siblings played some Elvis tunes for the owner and his family. Afterwards, Tielman received a guitar at a discount and only a small down payment.

Andy and his brothers began playing at a hotel for only 2,50 guilders a week. They were able to slowly acquire a fan base among rebellious youth and fellow musicians; however, they were not appreciated by the Dutch establishment or mainstream press. On national radio and television influential opinion makers such as Mies Bouwman and Willem Duys criticised and dismissed the brothers' music.

After a successful show at the World Exhibition in Brussels, Belgium, in 1958, the Tielman Brothers were signed by a Belgian company to record the first Dutch rock 'n' roll single, "Rock Little Baby of Mine". The band's flamboyant showmanship, acrobatic stage antics and rowdy sound were unheard of in the Netherlands. The band soon began performing internationally. Tielman later recalled that though they were referred to as "music rapists", the Dutch kids knew exactly what was going on. The Tielman brothers were also the first to play Gibson Les Paul guitars in Europe.

In Germany the band found popularity and recorded some German-language songs. They played many live venues in the Reeperbahn area of Hamburg, a city with many American GIs and a lively music scene. Andy Tielman made an impression on both the German and British musicians playing there. In a later interview with Rolling Stone, George Harrison reflected on his Hamburg period, enthusiastically referring to "Andy, the Indo man". Tielman and his band enjoyed a successful musical career throughout Europe until the emergence of British beat music headed by The Beatles.

== Asia Pacific ==
Although he enjoyed success in Europe, Tielman became upset over hysterical actions by fans, which included cases where women slit their wrists in front of the stage to get his attention. In the 1990 TV interview with Sonja Barend Tielman said: "That’s nothing to be proud of. [...] It’s just very, very sad. [...] I just could not stand it anymore. [...] Maybe the Beatles could deal with that kind of thing. Not me."

In the late 1970s Tielman abruptly ended his music career and left his family and property to live as a hermit in the jungles of Kalimantan among the Dayak people. In the TV interview with Sonja Barend he recalls: "The Dayak hunted monkeys for food. I just hunted wild chicken." For over 2 years he lived a low profile and meditated until a female fan tracked him down in the Bali backwoods. For over a year the young German woman, who later became his wife, Carmen Tielman, stayed with him there until he decided to return to the "civilised" world and resume his career.

Tielman then moved to Australia and lived there for 5 years. In the 1980s he toured Asia, Australia, New Zealand and Hawaii. Occasionally he would return to the Netherlands, where he gradually restarted his recording career. After the influential book Rockin Ramona was published in 1989, the Netherlands was re-discovering and rehabilitating its musical pioneers and Tielman was getting more and more recognition as a founding father of Dutch pop music.

== Netherlands ==
Tielman eventually returned to the Netherlands full-time. In 1990 he played in a reunion concert with the Tielman Brothers. The same year he released a solo album, entitled Now And Forever, followed in 1994 and 1995 by tours to the Caribbean and North America. In 1997 he released the album Loraine Jane, named after his only daughter. That year he also headlined a festival commemorating Elvis Presley at the Amsterdam RAI Convention Centre.

In 1998 the album Loraine Jane was presented at the Pasar Malam Besar in the Hague. On 31 October 1998 Tielman celebrated his 50th anniversary as an artist with a show at The Hague Houtrusthallen. Leading up to this anniversary Andy Tielman received much publicity in the Dutch media; Established Dutch artists like Herman Brood and Wally Tax expressed their admiration for his musical legacy. In 1999 Andy Tielman toured the United States.

In 2003 Andy Tielman recorded a new album in Amsterdam. In 2004 he recorded a live DVD at the Kurhaus in Scheveningen called It's My Life. In 2005 the DVD was officially presented at the Pasar Malam Besar in The Hague.

In 2005 Tielman was named to the Order of Orange-Nassau. Following the tsunami off Aceh in 2004, he made an appearance at the Dutch national benefit for the victims with two other Indo artists, Dinand Woesthoff (of Kane) and René van Barneveld (formerly of Urban Dance Squad), performing the traditional Indonesian songs "Rayuan Pulau Kelapa" and "Ole sio sayang e". In 2007 Tielman played with Chris Latul (formerly of Massada) in Utrecht, celebrating the 60th anniversary of the Pelita Foundation, the longest running social service organisation for Dutch Indos.

For the 50th anniversary of the single "Rock Little Baby of Mine" in 2008, the 50 Years of Nederpop Foundation in Groningen held a weekend long festival. On 3 October he performed at the Heineken Music Hall in Amsterdam during the 50 Years of Nederpop Live festival. He headlined the national 5 May Liberation Day celebrations in The Hague in 2008. With Indorock band Tjendol Sunrise, he recorded the album 21st Century Rock, which includes new versions of hits from the Tielman Brothers, several new songs, as well as a new version of "Rock Little Baby of Mine". At the Tong Tong Fair, he teamed with guitarist Jan Akkerman for a one-off concert.

By the fall of 2009, Tielman had fallen ill and canceled a scheduled tour when he was diagnosed with cancer. In November he was operated on. By 19 December he had recovered enough to give a short performance in Drachten, and in March 2010 played a show at the Benidorm Palace in Spain, supported by other acts, such as Riem de Wolff of the Blue Diamonds. During the 2011 edition of Indo festival the Tong Tong Fair, Tielman celebrated his 75th birthday and held a sold-out farewell concert at the Bintang Theatre. On 10 November 2011, Tielman died of cancer.
