= Boef =

Algerian-French rapper

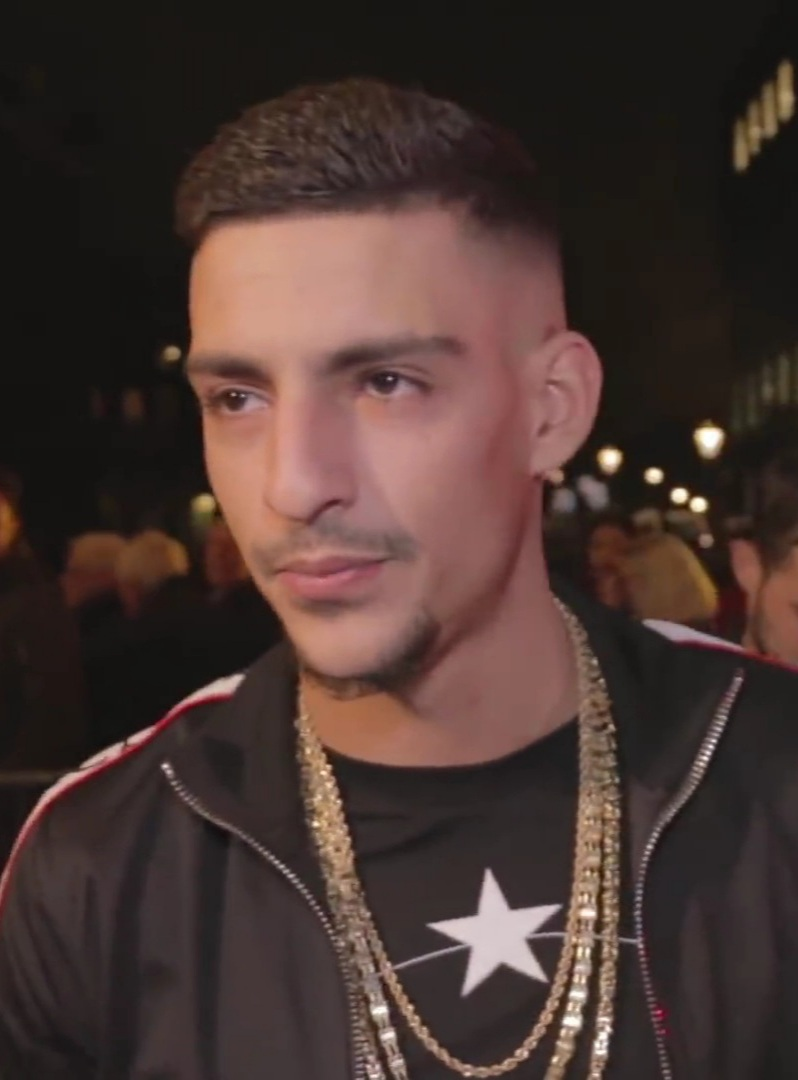
- Boef in 2018

Background information
- Also known as: Souf De Boef
- Born: Sofiane Youssef Samir Boussaadia; 28 February 1993 (age 33); Aubervilliers, Île-de-France, France
- Origin: Alkmaar, Netherlands
- Genre: Hip-hop
- Occupations: Rapper; vlogger
- Years active: 2015–present
- Labels: BoefMusic; Zonamo Underground; Sony Music Entertainment

Sofiane Youssef Samir Boussaadia (Arabic: سفيان يوسف سمير بوسعدية, romanized: sufyān yūsuf samīr būsaʿādiyya; born 28 February 1993), known professionally as Boef (Dutch pronunciation: [buf]; "crook"), is a Dutch-language rapper and vlogger of French nationality. Within a year of his start in 2015, he became one of the most popular rappers in the Netherlands after Lil' Kleine and Ronnie Flex. He released an album and various singles. His vlog and rap videos were viewed many millions of times on the internet.

His first EP Gewoon Boef was released in February 2016 and his first album Slaaptekort came out in March 2017. Slaaptekort (Dutch for 'sleep deprivation') is the album with the most streams on the release date in the Netherlands, a record that was previously held by Ed Sheeran's ÷. Many of his songs have made it on the charts in the Netherlands and Belgian Flanders.

== Early life ==
Boef was born in France in Île-de-France (Paris conurbation) to Algerian parents. At the age of four, he lived with his uncle in Eindhoven. He also lived with him for two years in Houston, Texas, and at the age of thirteen he moved to Alkmaar. He told the newspaper De Volkskrant that he was in juvenile detention for six months at the age of sixteen and one and a half years from the age of eighteen for a criminal offense and then six months for refusing to cooperate with the probation service.

== Career ==
After his release from prison, he started focusing on rap music. He contacted Zonamo Underground through his friend and rapper Otie, after contacting Zonamo Underground they invited Boef for a session in February 2015. This was very well received and gained over a million views on YouTube in a short period of time.

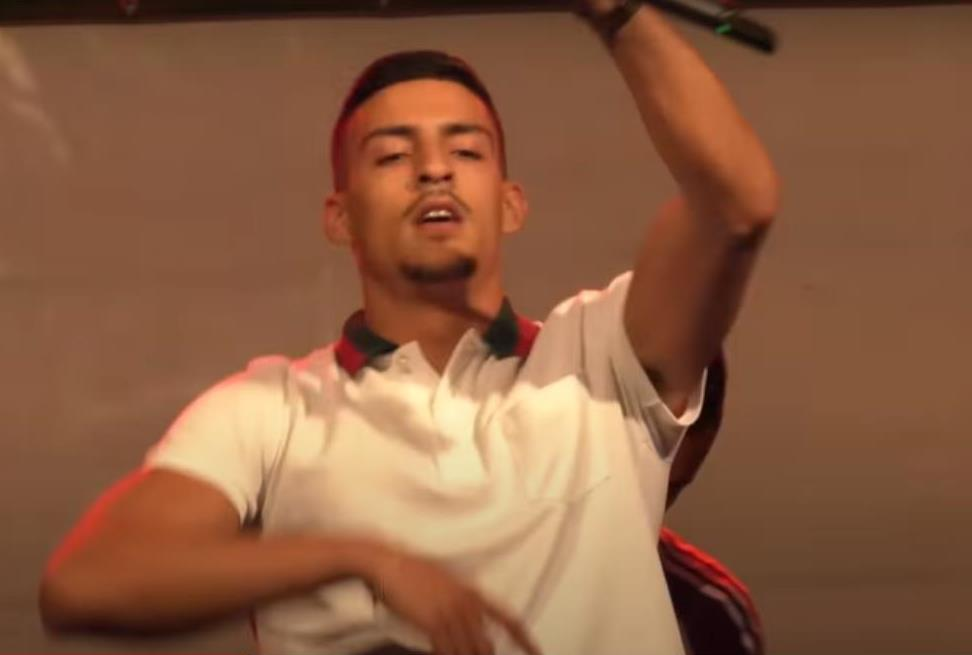
Boef in 2017.

After his first zonamo session in 2015, Boef signed a contract with Zonamo Underground. His success grew beyond the expectations of both himself and his management. BNN presenter Rotjoch said about his breakthrough: "In 2015 Boef suddenly arrived; nobody knew him. After his Zonamo session, he is indispensable in the scene."

He released several songs that reached the Single Top 100. His EP Gewoon BOEF came in at number 4 in February 2016 in the Dutch Album Top 100, which was recorded around thirty weeks. The album was also in the Flemish Album Top 200 for a few weeks.

In April 2016 Boef released his breakthrough hit "Lauw" which gained millions of views on YouTube. He recorded the whole video clip in Dubai together with the producer Harun B. He also has a vlogging channel on YouTube, where he uploads videos of his daily life and trips.

From 2021, Boussaadia offers entrepreneurial courses together with Lil' Kleine.

In 2024, The rapper Boef launched Chick & Cheez, a fast-food chain specializing in chicken-based meals.

During the New Year's night of 2017–2018, Boef had a flat tire after a performance. After three women gave him a lift when coming back from a party, he called them "hookers" on social media. As a result, Dutch and Belgian radio stations boycotted his music for a time. He apologized for his statements the following day (2 January) and also on 20 January 2018.

== Discography ==
=== Studio albums ===
Year	Album	Peak positions		Certification
Year	Album	NLD	BEL (Fl)	Certification
2017	Slaaptekort	1	3	NVPI: Platinum
2020	Allemaal een droom	1	2	
2023	Luxeprobleem	1	3	

=== Extended plays ===
Year	Album	Peak positions		Certification
Year	Album	NLD	BEL (Fl)	Certification
2016	Gewoon Boef	4	26	NVPI: Platinum
2018	93	1	2	

=== Singles ===
==== As lead artist ====
Year	Single	Peak positions		Certification	Album
Year	Single	NLD	BEL (Fl)	Certification	Album
2016	"Lauw"	35	— (Note: "Lauw" did not enter the official Belgian Ultratop 50 charts, but peaked at number 21 on the bubbling under Ultratip charts.)	NVPI: Platinum	Gewoon Boef
2016	"Hosselen"	38	—	NVPI: Gold	Gewoon Boef
2016	"Paperchase"	27	—	NVPI: Gold	
2016	"Range Sessie"	17	—	NVPI: Gold	Slaaptekort
2016	"Salam" (with Soufiane Eddyani)	3	26	NVPI: Platinum	Slaaptekort
2016	"Habiba"	1	3	NVPI: 4× Platinum	Slaaptekort
2016	"Wie praat die gaat" (with Ismo & Lijpe)	13	—		
2017	"Op Me Monnie" (with Frenna / remix: original song is from Famke Louise)	2	—	NVPI: Gold	
2018	"Antwoord"	1	25		
2018	"Sofiane"	—	23	NVPI: Platinum	
2018	"Draai het om"	3	— (Note: "Draai het om" did not enter the official Belgian Ultratop 50 charts, but peaked at number 12 on the bubbling under Ultratip charts.)		
2018	"Ratata"	3	41		
2018	"Rolls Sessie"	5	26		
2018	"Terug naar toen" (featuring Lijpe)	5	— (Note: "Terug naar toen" did not enter the official Belgian Ultratop 50 charts, but peaked at number 7 on the bubbling under Ultratip charts.)		
2019	"Allang al niet meer"	1	45		
2019	"Guap" (featuring Dopebwoy)	1	47		
2019	"Kofferbak" (with Chivv)	7	— (Note: "Kofferbak" did not enter the official Belgian Ultratop 50 charts, but peaked at number 21 on the bubbling under Ultratip charts.)		
2020	"Memories"	4	— (Note: "Memories" did not enter the official Belgian Ultratop 50 charts, but peaked at number 4 on the bubbling under Ultratip charts.)		
2022	"Monaco" (with Dopebwoy and Srno)	26	—		
2022	"Excuseer"	21	—		
2022	"Flexxen" (with Numidia, Cristian D and Diquenza)	11	—		
2022	"Did a Lotta Shit" (with Mario Cash)	53	—		
2022	"FF ademen jij"	3	49		
2022	"Voor het kiezen"	54	—		
2023	"Probleem" (featuring Cristan D)	1	34		
2023	"Natte sokken" (featuring KA)	10	—		
2023	"Herinnering" (featuring Lil' Kleine)	1	23		
2023	"Rovers" (featuring Lijpe and Djaga Djaga)	10	—		
2023	"Al die dagen" (featuring Ronnie Flex)	50	—		
2023	"AMG" (with Shirak Josylvio)	6	—		
2023	"Champions League" (with Flemming)	9	—		
2024	"Werkpaarden" (with Glades and Lijpe featuring 3robi)	25	—		
2024	"Emilie" (with Cristian D and KA featuring Shirak)	40	—		
2024	"Geldmachine" (with Dopebwoy and Josylvio)	56	—		
2026	"Heftig man" (with Idaly and Lil' Kleine)	10	—		

==== As featured artist ====
Year	Single	Peak positions	Album
Year	Single	NLD	Album
2016	"Een klein beetje geluk" (Ali B feat. Sevn Alias & Boef)	58	Ali B album Een klein beetje geluk
2016	"Niet van mij alleen" (Mafe feat. Boef)	69	
2016	"Salut" (Gio / Boef / Bollebof / Justice Toch)	76	
2016	"Overal" (F1rstman feat. DJ Youss-F & Boef)	7	
2016	"Muhammad Ali" (Childsplay feat. Hef, Boef, Lijpe & MocroManiac)	95	
2017	"Tempo" (Jairzinho feat. Sevn Alias, BKO & Boef)	2	
2017	"Come Again" (Ronnie Flex feat. Boef)	2	
2017	"Voy a bailar" (Ali B feat. Boef, Rolf Sanchez and RedOne)	13	
2023	"Pornstar Martini" ($hirak feat. Cristian D, Lil Kleine and Boef)	1	

=== Other charted songs ===
Year	Single	Peak positions	Certification	Album
Year	Single	NLD	Certification	Album
2016	"Niet eens zo" (featuring Lijpe)	78		Gewoon Boef
2016	"Gevangenis"	86		Gewoon Boef
2016	"Sinds toen"	95		Gewoon Boef
2016	"Niks" (Lijpe & Boef)	70		
2016	"Drugs" (Boef featuring Zack Ink)	91		
2017	"Slapend rijk" (with Sevn Alias)	3	NVPI: Platinum	Slaaptekort
2017	"Ik ga weg" (with Ali B)	5	NVPI: Gold	Slaaptekort
2017	"Wejooh" (with Lil' Kleine)	6	NVPI: Gold	Slaaptekort
2017	"Kangoeroe"	9	NVPI: Gold	Slaaptekort
2017	"Werken"	10	NVPI: Gold	Slaaptekort
2017	"Speciaal" (with Ronnie Flex)	11	NVPI: Gold	Slaaptekort
2017	"Beckham"	12		Slaaptekort
2017	"Fetty Wap" (with Para Mocro)	13	NVPI: Gold	Slaaptekort
2017	"Cocaïne"	14		Slaaptekort
2017	"Zeg mij"	22		Slaaptekort
2017	"Aslan"	23		Slaaptekort
2017	"Kopzorgen"	24		Slaaptekort
2017	"Slecht blijft"	25		Slaaptekort

== Awards and nominations ==
Year	Awards	Category	Work	Result
2017	MTV Europe Music Awards	Best Dutch Act	Himself	Nominated
2020	Golden Lemon Awards	Best Rap Act	Himself	Won
