= Hef (rapper) =

Dutch rapper

- Also known as: Hef Bundy, Heffelini, Bundes
- Born: Julliard Frans; March 18, 1987 (age 39); Rotterdam, Netherlands
- Genre: Hip hop
- Occupations: Rapper; songwriter
- Instrument: Vocals
- Years active: 2008–present
- Label: Noah's Ark

Julliard Frans (born March 18, 1987), known professionally as Hef, is a Dutch rapper.

== Career ==
Julliard Frans was born on March 18, 1987 in Rotterdam to a Curaçaoan mother and a Surinamese father. He is a brother of fellow rappers Adje and Crooks. He grew up in the borough Hoogvliet in Rotterdam, which he considered a problem neighbourhood. During his childhood, his parents sold drugs while he was playing with his toys next to them. He eventually began selling drugs himself and began stealing goods, such as scooters and bicycles. He has left the offenses behind him and began focusing on music. In 2008, he gained attention for his rap songs about street life in Hoogvliet, when he released the single "Puur". The same year he released the mixtape Boyz in de hood vol. 1 with his brothers Adje and Crooks, for which they won a State Award.

In 2009, he released the mixtape Hefvermogen, which was re-released by the label Noah's Ark as his debut album in 2010. The album contained the tracks "Overal", "Gone" featuring Major and "Op een missie".

== Discography ==
Studio albums

- Hefvermogen (2009)
- Papierwerk (2012)
- 13 (2015)
- Ruman (2016)
- Geit (2017)
- Koud (2019)
- Tranen (2019)
- Rook (2020)
- Hefvermogen 2 (2022)
- Bloed Is Dikker Dan Water (2023)
