= Don't Cry for Me (Alok, Martin Jensen and Jason Derulo song) =

Single by Alok, Martin Jensen and Jason Derulo
- Released: July 10, 2020
- Length: 2:35
- Label: Virgin
- Songwriters: Jason Derulo; Richard Boardman; Pablo Bowman; Alok; David Strääf; Ohyes; James Blount
- Producers: Martin Jensen; Alok; The Six; Ohyes

Alok singles chronology
"Hear Me Tonight" (2020)	"Don't Cry for Me" (2020)	"Let Me Go" (2020)

Martin Jensen singles chronology
"I'm Just Feelin' (Du Du Du)" (2020)	"Don't Cry for Me" (2020)	"At Least I Had Fun" (2020)

Jason Derulo singles chronology
"Coño" (2020)	"Don't Cry for Me" (2020)	"Take You Dancing" (2020)

"Don't Cry for Me" is a song by Brazilian DJ and record producer Alok, Danish DJ and record producer Martin Jensen, with vocals from American singer Jason Derulo. It was released as a single on July 10, 2020, by Virgin Records. The song was written by Derulo, Richard Boardman, Pablo Bowman, Alok, David Strääf, Ohyes and James Blount.

== Personnel ==
- Alok – producer, composer, lyricist, associated performer, guitar, music production
- Martin Jensen – producer, associated performer, music production, synthesizer
- Ohyes – producer, composer, lyricist, associated performer, bass programming, drum programming, mixer, music production, piano, programming, recording arranger, sound effects, studio personnel, synthesizer
- The Six – producer, associated performer
- David Strääf – composer, lyricist, associated performer, bass programming, drum programming, guitar, piano, programming, recording arranger, sound effects, synthesizer
- James Blount – composer, lyricist
- Jason Derulo – composer, lyricist, associated performer, vocals
- Pablo Bowman – composer, lyricist, associated performer, whistle
- Richard Boardman – composer, lyricist, associated performer, music production, piano, programming, recording arranger, synthesizer
- Ben Hogarth – associated performer, studio personnel, vocal engineer, vocal producer
- Robbie Soukiasyan – associated performer, studio personnel, vocal engineer, vocal producer
- One Mix Mastering – mastering engineer, studio personnel
- Tom Hall – mastering engineer, studio personnel

== Charts ==
Chart performance for "Don't Cry for Me"
Chart (2020)	Peak position
Belgium (Ultratip Bubbling Under Wallonia)	30
Scottish Singles Sales (Official Charts)	54
Sweden (Sverigetopplistan)	91
Switzerland (Schweizer Hitparade)	90

== Certifications ==
Certifications for "Don't Cry for Me"
Region	Certification	Certified units/sales
Brazil (Pro-Música Brasil)	Diamond	300,000^{‡}
^{‡} Sales+streaming figures based on certification alone.

== Release history ==
Release history and formats for "Don't Cry for Me"
Region	Date	Format	Label	Ref.
Various	July 10, 2020	Digital download; streaming	Virgin	
