= Traag =

Single by Bizzey
- Language: Dutch
- English title: Slow
- Released: 12 May 2017
- Genre: nederhop; funk carioca; dembow beat
- Length: 3:07
- Label: Noah's Ark
- Lyricists: Bizzey; Kraantje Pappie; Jozo
- Producers: Bizzey; Ramiks

Music video
- "Traag" on YouTube

Traag is a song by Dutch hip hop artist Bizzey, featuring rappers Jozo and Kraantje Pappie, released as a single in 2017.

Written by Bizzey, Kraantje Pappie, Jozo and Ramiks, and produced by Ramiks and Bizzey, the song is a Nederhop track with influences from baile funk and dembow. The lyrics focus on sexual themes, and the song is considered a club track. The song was heavily inspired by reggaeton rhythms, with the chorus being sung in a monotone and repeating manner. female voice is also heard in the song, whose identity was revealed in 2025 as Marloes Pieksma. She opted out of receiving royalties.

The song and its music video, which features women dancing provocatively in the streets of Madrid, went viral on YouTube, gaining substantial views in the Netherlands and becoming a hit in Turkey. By 2024, the song gained success in Latin America thanks to TikTok. It became the most-viewed Dutch-language video on YouTube when it surpassed 50 million views. The song is on Spotify the most streamed Dutch language song in History, trailed by Europapa. The single was certified quadruple platinum in the Netherlands.
