= Bintangs =

Dutch rhythm and blues band

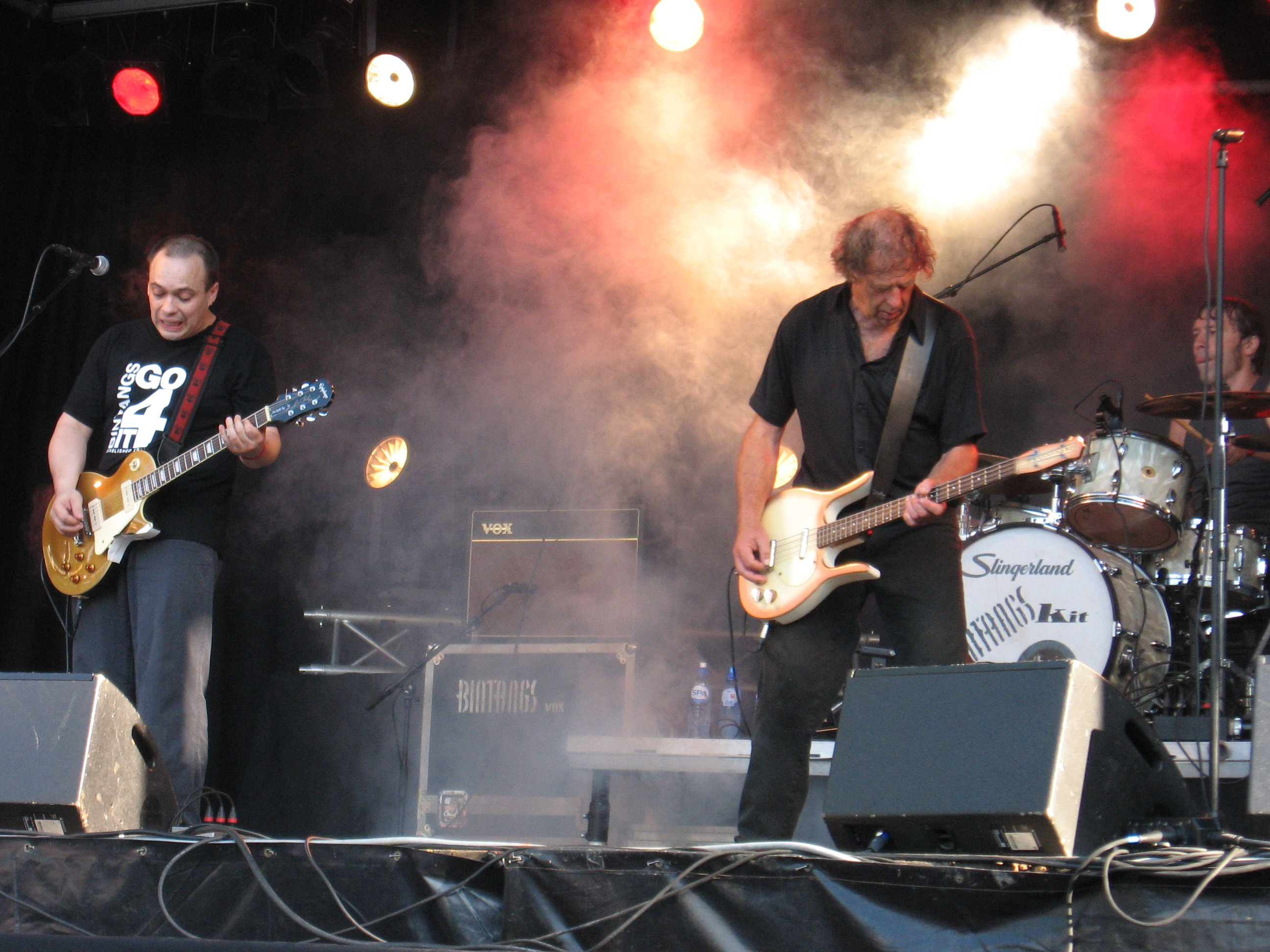
- The Bintangs at Westerpop, 2007

Background information
- Origin: Beverwijk
- Genres: Indorock, rhythm and blues
- Years active: 1961–1985, 1989–present
- Members: Frank Kraaijeveld; Burt van der Meij; Marco Nicola; Dagomar Jansen
- Past members: Gus Pleines, Jack van Schie, Jan Wijte, Arti Kraaijeveld, Wil Nimitz, Henk van Besu, Peter de Leeuwe, Aad Hooft, Rob van Donselaar, Ronald Krom, Rob ten Bokum, Jack van Schie, Harry Schierbeek, Jaap Castricum, Albert Schierbeek, Jan-Paul van der Meij, Rob Ruijter, Cees Brouwer,
- Website: bintangs.nl

The Bintangs are a Dutch rhythm and blues band. Founded in 1961 in Beverwijk as an indorock band, they soon began playing a rougher, rhythm and blues-inflected style. The band had a four-year hiatus in the 1980s but reunited and are still active. The band has gone through many members (in 1985 they were in their 33rd lineup), with Frank Kraaijeveld (bass and vocals) as a constant element. They scored one hit, in 1970, and though commercial success has eluded them nationally and internationally they remain a popular live act.

== Formation and success ==
The Bintangs (after the Bahasa Indonesia word for "star") were established in 1961 as an indorock band, performing covers at live venues in Beverwijk. The original lineup was Frank and Arti Kraaijeveld on bass and guitar, respectively (both performed vocals), Meine Fernhout on guitar, and Jimmy Jansen on drums. Frank, in a 1985 interview, mentioned how impressed he was when he first saw the Tielman Brothers play, and soon the band began mixing in R&B influences, in part inspired by The Rolling Stones and in part to differentiate their sound from that of the many bands playing in the vein of The Shadows. In 1965 they recorded their first single, on Muziek Express, Willie Dixon's "You Can't Judge a Book by Looking at the Cover" (another song that was made famous by Bo Diddley and was also written by him, "I'm a Man", was the B-side), with Henk van Besu on drums, Jan Wijte on rhythm guitar, and Will Nimitsz on vocals and mouth harp. A loyal fanbase had, by the mid-sixties, risked life and limb to paint the band's name on a gas holder in Beverwijk. By 1969 they had opened for The Rolling Stones and The Kinks and released several further singles (three with Muziek Express). In 1969 they signed with Phonogram Records, with whom they released their first album, Blues on the Ceiling. Their greatest hits, "Ridin' on the L & N" and "Travelling in the U.S.A., were released in 1969 and 1970, respectively. By this time, the band had a steel guitar player as well, Rob van Donselaar. An album, Travelling in the U.S.A., was released in 1970 by Phonogram, and while another single from that album, "He Didn't Wanna Go Home", did not do as well as expected (though it did chart in the Netherlands), album sales were reported to be strong. In a 1970 interview with De Telegraaf the band characterized itself as "playing from the heart" and announced another single, "Lion Tamer".

By 1969 Arti was not as active with the band, and in 1972 he and Frank created their own short-lived band, the Circus Kraaijeveld, which lasted "for a single and a half", according to Arti in a 1977 interview. Though Fernhout and Jansen continued the Bintangs, in 1973 they released only one recording, the album Hey Dupes. The album's title song was released as a single, with little success. By this time the band had two saxophone players; it consisted of Rob Kruisman on tenor saxophone and vocals; Aad Hooft on drums; Rob van Donselaar on guitar, steel guitar, and vocals; Rob ten Bokum on guitar; Ronald Krom on bass; and Charles van der Steeg on tenor saxophone. Manager Henk Penseel mused that commercial success eluded the band since their old hits were still well-known but that their old "Rolling Stones sound" was gone, and audiences had not grown familiar with the new direction the band had taken. In 1974 Frank returned, without Arti. Three other men joined the band: singer Gus Pleines, guitarist Jack van Schie, and drummer Harry Schierbeek. The following year they released another album, Genuine Bull, and guitarist Jaap (Japie) Castricum joined. Regarding Genuine Bull, producer Steve Verocca was quoted as saying that, after 20 years as a producer, he "heard ... a new approach to rock & roll" during the sessions.

== Later years ==
The next several years saw the Bintangs release several albums and singles, some recorded in the United Kingdom. In 1977 Arti Kraaijeveld had returned to the Netherlands after a period in Los Angeles, where he recorded an album for Shelter Records. He released Ram Man, containing mostly older material Arti wrote during a hiatus from the band; it was recorded in three days in Brussels, and released on a small label, New Entry. By the time the Bintangs performed for the celebration of the University of Groningen's 366th birthday in 1979, they were the oldest surviving Dutch band. A 1981 commemorative compilation album, Still Going Strong, was released on Ariola, but achieved no commercial success. Despite lack of success nationally and internationally, the band, as one newspaper wrote, had a loyal fanbase within the Netherlands, which made "every performance a memorable event". Jaap van Eggermont produced the 1985 single "Rosemary Nymphet", but it received no radioplay. Ultimately, in 1985, they gave a farewell concert at Paradiso in Amsterdam. The recording of this concert was released as an album, Bye Bye.

During the following two years Frank Kraaijeveld established his own band, in collaboration with Cees Brouwer. Pleines and van Schie, meanwhile, toured under the name 14all (read "one for all"). In 1988 Decca rereleased two Bintangs albums, Travelling in the USA (1970) and Ridin' with the Bintangs (1972), under the title Original Tapes. The Bintangs reunited the following year, with Gus Pleines, Frank Kaaijeveld, Jack van Schie, Jan Wijte and Cees Brouwer. Although initially intent on doing a concert in each of the 12 provinces of the Netherlands, this lineup lasted 13 years; Frank Kraaijeveld described his experience outside the Bintangs as "unsatisfying". Covering the reunion, Het Vrije Volk described the Bintangs as "the most underrated live band from Netherlands" while Jacob Haagsma of the Leeuwarder Courant wrote "it's good that the Bintangs came back to us".

For their 40th anniversary in 2001, the Bintangs held a series of concerts. Venues included the Donkey Shot in Heemskerk, the Patronaat in Haarlem, and the Kennemer Theater in Beverwijk. In 2003, after Brouwer's death, Burt van der Meij was selected as drummer. By the following year, however, amidst friction within the group, he left the group with van Schie and Pleines. Brothers Maarten(guitar) and Gerben Ibelings (drums) joined the band in 2004, and the following year former roadie Dagomar Jansen was given a permanent role singing backing vocals and performing the harmonica. in 2017 a new line up. Guitarist Marco Nicola and drummer Burt van der Meij replaced Gerben and Maarten Ibelings. The new line up Bintangs released in 2021 a brand new album "These Hands". In the year 2021, Bintangs the oldest playing, recording band from The Netherlands. Sixty! 60 years of pure rhythm and blues!! The album "These Hands" Volkskrant September 2021 **** NRC ***

== Style ==
Pim Oets, in a 1970 article for Het Vrije Volk, compared Pleines' vocals to those of Mick Jagger; Jagger's Rolling Stones influenced the Bintangs, and the bands have often been compared. The Bintangs' early repertoire included multiple songs by Bo Diddley.

== Discography ==
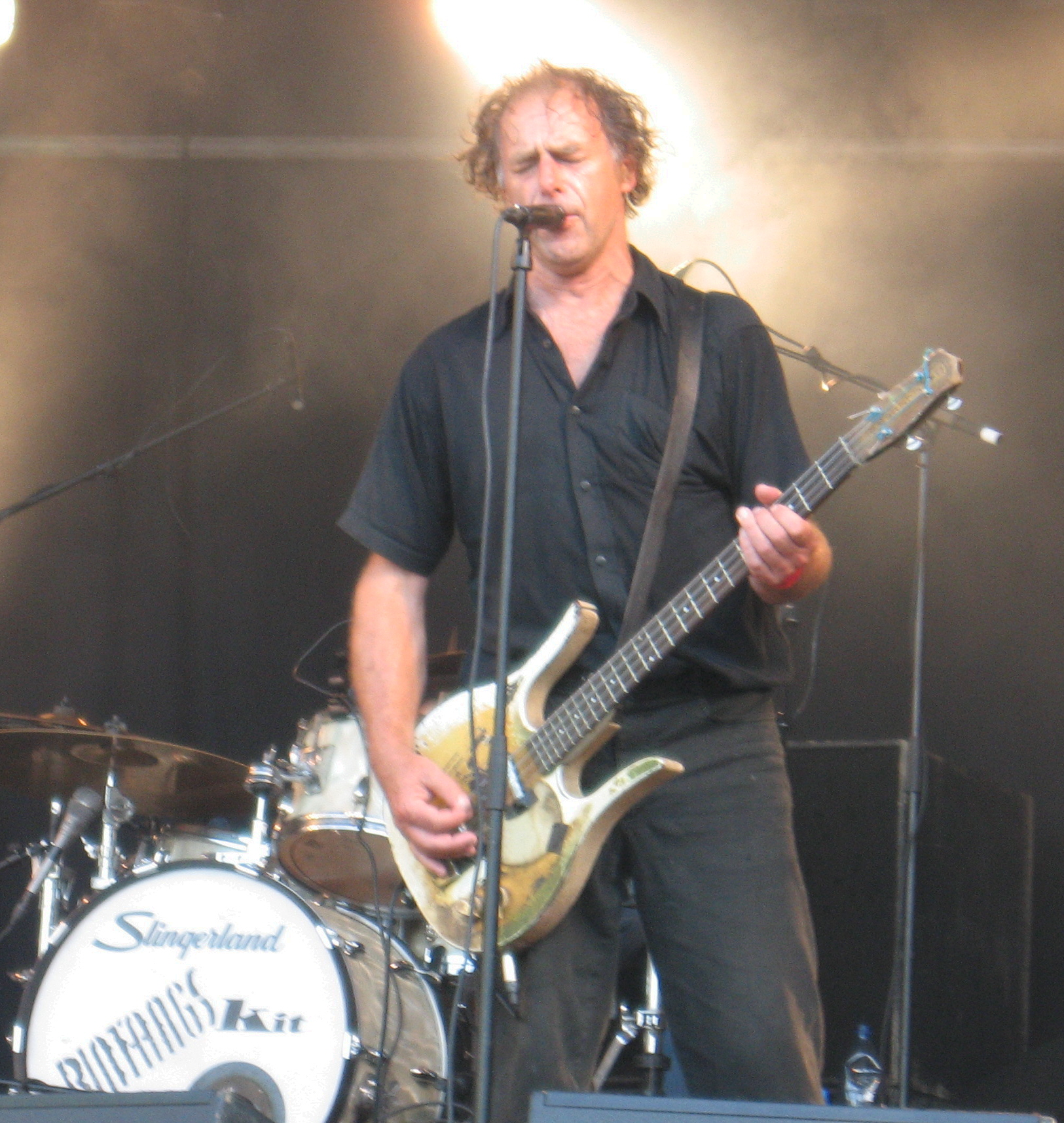
Frank Kraaijeveld, 2007

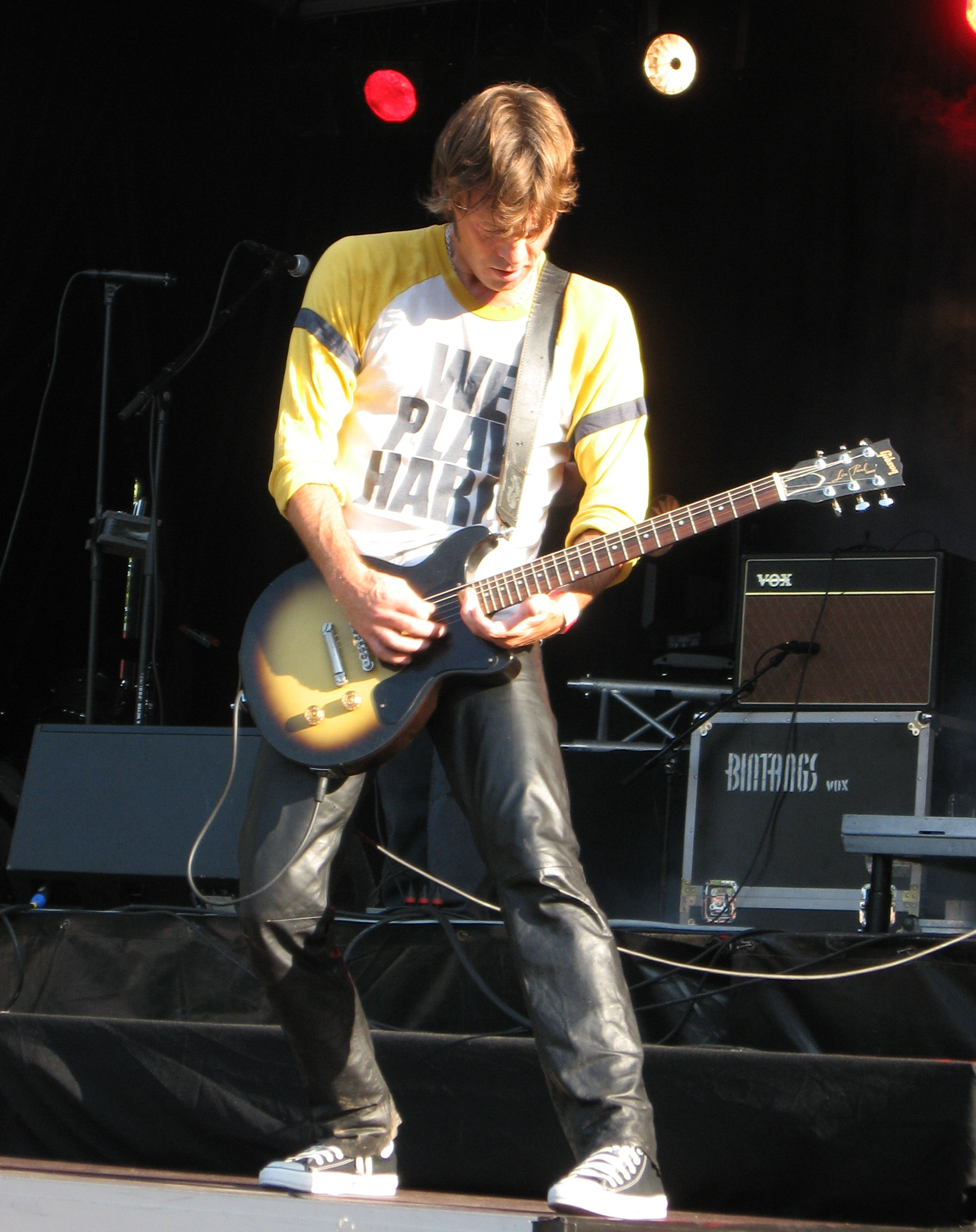
Maarten Ibelings, 2007

=== Albums ===
Album title	Release date	Charting in the Dutch Album Top 100			Comments
Album title	Release date	Date of entry	Highest	Weeks	Comments
Blues on the Ceiling	1969	-			
Travelling in the U.S.A.	1970	-			
Ridin' with the Bintangs	1972	-			
Genuine Bull	1975	10-05-1975	26	5	
Bintangs	1978	-			
Night-Fighter	1979	-			
Mickey Finn	1980	-			
Still Going Strong	1981	-			
Rockfield Beauties	1982	-			
Livetime	1983	-			
Bye Bye – Live in Paradiso	1985	-			Live album
Original Tapes – Travellin' in the Usa + Ridin' with the Bintangs	1988	-			
Live-File	1988	-			
Alright Alright	1991	-			
Ruby Red Hot	1994	-			
Dynamite Night	1996	-			
The Bintangs	1999	-			
Genuine Bull	1999	-			
La Femme Sans Tête	2002	-			
The Complete Collection – the Early Years '63-'73	2003	-			Compilation album
Doc	2006	-			
Fire and Iron	2009	-			
Night-Fighter + Mickey Finn	2010	-			
Fifty/Fifty (50 Years of Dutch Rockhistory)	2011	-			

=== Singles ===
Single title	Release date	Charting in the Dutch Top 40			Comments
Single title	Release date	Date of entry	Highest	Weeks	Comments
"You Can't Judge a Book By Looking at the Cover"	1965	-			
"Walking the Boogie"	1966	-			
"Splendid Sight"	1966	-			
"Pileworks"	1967	-			
"Please Do Listen"	1967	-			
"Smokestack Lightning"	1969	-			
"Ridin' on the L & N"	1969	08-11-1969	12	9	Number 11 in the Single Top 100
"Travelling in the U.S.A."	1970	31-01-1970	9	9	Number 10 in the Single Top 100
"He Didn't Wanna Go Home"	1970	27-06-1970	35	2	Number 29 in the Single Top 100
"Liontamer"	1970	19-09-1970	Tip10	-	
"I'm on My Own Again"	1971	15-05-1971	32	4	
"The Bride"	1971	11-12-1971	Tip16	-	
"You Got Love"	1972	-			
"We're Gonna Make It"	1972	-			
"Hey Dupes"	1973	-			
"Wait"	1974	-			
"Open and Busted"	1975	-			
"Big Black Tank"	1978	-			
"Snake in the Grass"	1979	09-06-1979	Tip14	-	
"Let Me Pass"	1979	-			
"Rock the Socks Out of Your Shoes"	1980	-			
"Air Travel"	1981	-			
"Rosemary Nymphet"	1982	-			
"It's All in My Room"	1982	-			
"Bayou Woman"	1982	-			
"I Wanna Be Your Cigarette"	1983	-			
"Rhythm & Blues: Everything (Is Gonna Be Everything)"	1987	-			
"Alright Alright"	1991	-			
"Put It in a Dark Place"	1991	-			
"I Wish It Would Rain"	1994	-			
"Rhythm of Your Heartbeat"	1995	-			
