= Cartier (song) =

Single by Dopebwoy
- Language: Dutch
- English title: Cartier
- Released: 23 June 2017
- Genre: Nederhop; Afrobeats
- Length: 4:12
- Label: Avalon Music
- Lyricists: Dopebwoy; Chivv; 3robi
- Producers: Dopebwoy; Ramiks

Music video
- "Cartier" on YouTube

Cartier is a song by Dutch Surinamese rapper Jordan Jacott, better known as Dopebwoy, featuring fellow Dutch rappers Chivv and 3robi. It was released as a single in 2017 and later included as the third track on Dopebwoy's album Andere flex that same year. Upon release, Cartier became the most-streamed Dutch-language song on both Spotify and YouTube. As of 2024, it remains one of the most-streamed Dutch-language songs.

== Background ==
The song was written by Chyvon Pala, Anass Haouam, and Jordan Jacott, with the latter also serving as the producer. It falls within the Nederhop genre with influences of Afrobeats, and the lyrics focus on wealth and luxurious lifestyles. The title refers to the luxury brand Cartier, specifically referencing "planga van Cartier," which is street slang for Cartier sunglasses. Initially, the beat was created for the group SBMG's song 4x duurder, but Dopebwoy decided to keep it for himself, recognizing its quality, despite being offered money for it. The track became a significant hit, marking Dopebwoy's breakthrough in the music industry. In the Netherlands, the single achieved five-times platinum status. This was the first collaboration between the three artists, both collectively and individually. They have since worked together on several other tracks, including Domme invest, Walou crisis, Champagne papi, and Marbella.
