= Lijpe =

Dutch rapper of Moroccan descent

- Born: Abdessamed Achahbar; 29 October 1992 (age 33); Utrecht, Netherlands
- Genre: Dutch hip hop
- Occupation: Rapper
- Label: TopNotch

Abdessamed Achahbar (born in Utrecht, Netherlands on 29 October 1992) better known as Lijpe is a Dutch rapper of Moroccan origin. He was born in Maarssen. He released his EP Van de bodem naar de grond in 2014 and his debut album Levensles in 2015. His 2016 album Jackpot reached number 2 on the Dutch Albums chart.

== Discography ==
=== Albums ===
Year	Title	Peak positions	Certification
Year	Title	NED	Certification
2015	Levensles	13	
2016	Jackpot	2	
2017	Zandloper	1	
2018	Tijdloos (with Ismo)	2	
2018	Andere leven	1	
2019	Fastlife	1	
2020	Dagboek	1	
2021	Verzegeld	1	
2021	Selfmade	2	
2022	Lijpe	1	
2026	Rode kaart	1	

=== EPs ===
Year	Title	Peak positions
Year	Title	NED
2014	Van de bodem naar de grond	34

=== Singles ===
Year	Title	Peak positions	Certifications	Album
Year	Title	NED	Certifications	Album
2016	"Jackpot"	61		Jackpot
2016	"Mama"	69		Jackpot
2016	"Eng"	18	NVPI: Platinum	Jackpot
2017	"Wie praat die gaat" (with Boef and Ismo)	13	NVPI: Gold	
2017	"Geen Stress"	58		
2017	"Buurt heet" (with Mula B)	42		
2018	"Goud" (with Ismo)	34		Tijdloos
2018	"Microfoon"	14		
2020	"Denk aan jou" (with ICE)	76		
2020	"#Lijpeseason 2.0"	38		
2021	"Mansory" (featuring Frenna)	2		
2021	"Van de buurt"	11		
2021	"Selfmade"	3		
2021	"Back 2 Back" (with Fatah)	31		
2022	"Was er nooit"	4		
2022	"In de goot"	11		
2022	"El Clásico" (with Frenna)	5		
2023	"Hoop" (with KA)	16		
2023	"Heavy" (with Henkie T)	42		
2023	"Euro's & Dollars" (with Fatah)	44		
2023	"SABR"	23		
2023	"100 doezoe cash" (with Fatah, KA and Trobi)	19		
2023	"Over de grens"	23		
2023	"Freestyle" (with Trobi)	64		
2023	"Tanger" (with Ashafar and Henkie T)	62		
2024	"Red Notice" (with Fatah)	24		
2024	"Winter Jacka"	41		
2024	"Regenachtig"	60		
2024	"Werkpaarden" (with Glades and Boef featuring 3robi)	25		
2024	"Alleen gedaan" (with Djaga Djaga)	77		
2024	"Philly haal" (with Djaga Djaga)	51		
2024	"Eerste op de weg" (with Fatah)	55		
2024	"Geen hoogmoed"	27		
2024	"Vicieuze cirkel"	45		
2024	"La Liga" (featuring Jandro)	49		
2024	"Onmogelijk" (featuring Fatah)	69		
2025	"8 minuten"	15		
2025	"Weinig liefde" (featuring Jonna Fraser)	55		
2025	"Purosangue" (with Fatah)	43		
2025	"Schweinsteiger" (featuring Leblanco)	20		
2025	"Alcantara" (with Esko and JoeyAK)	27		
2025	"London" (featuring Frenna)	22		

=== Other charting releases ===
Year	Single	Peak positions	Certifications	Album
Year	Single	NED	Certifications	Album
2015	"Accepteren" (feat. D-Double)	67		Levensles
2015	"Valt niet mee" (feat. Frenna & Ares)	96		Levensles
2015	"Mandela" (SBMG with Sevn Alias, Louis, D-Double, Lijpe & Hef)	58		
2016	"Bijna bij de jackpot"	43		Jackpot
2016	"Pitbull"	44	NVPI: Gold	Jackpot
2016	"Sloopsessie"	56		Jackpot
2016	"Codes" (feat. Sevn Alias)	57		Jackpot
2016	"Alles voor niks"	58		Jackpot
2016	"Gewoon"	62		Jackpot
2016	"Jezelf"	64		Jackpot
2016	"Zij wilt me zien" (feat. Equalz)	66		Jackpot
2016	"Het is zo beter"	67		Jackpot
2016	"Rekeningen"	75		Jackpot
2016	"Rennen"	77		Jackpot
2016	"Leunen"	87		Jackpot
2016	"Hoofdpijn"	91		Jackpot
2016	"Strijders" (feat. D-Double & SBMG)	92		Jackpot
2016	"Niks" (with Boef)	70		
2017	"Geen tijd" (with D-Double)	87	NVPI: Gold	
2017	"Doe rustig!" (with DJ Stijco)	7		Zandloper
2017	"Heimwee"	33		Zandloper
2017	"Tevreden"	77		Zandloper
2017	"Andere tijd"	79		Zandloper
2017	"Beseft"	82		Zandloper
2017	"Het komt allemaal goed"	77		Zandloper
2017	"Uitweg"	87		Zandloper
2017	"Marokko"	88		Zandloper
2017	"Luister goed"	92		Zandloper
2017	"Geen zorgen meer"	92		Zandloper
2017	"BrainFreeze"	92		Zandloper
2018	"Zeg me" (with Ismo)	95		Tijdloos

Featured in

Year	Single	Peak positions	Certifications	Album
Year	Single	NED	Certifications	Album
2015	"Vallen in de club" (Ronnie Flex, Jandro, Cartiez, Lijpe)	93	NVPI: Platinum	
2015	"Kan er niet omheen" (Jonna Fraser, Lijpe, KM & Ronnie Flex)	99	NVPI: Gold	
2016	"Woosh" (Sevn Alias x Jonna Fraser x Lijpe)	73		
2016	"Niet eens zo " (Boef feat. Lijpe)	78		Boef EP; Gewoon Boef
2016	"Ren voor ons" (Kevin feat. Lijpe)	32	NVPI: Gold	
2016	"In de Streets" (Kevin feat. Lijpe, Sevn Alias, Kippie & Vic9)	36		
2016	"Muhammad Ali" (Childsplay feat. Hef, Boef, Lijpe & MocroManiac)	95	NVPI: Gold	
