= Tielman Brothers =

Dutch-Indonesian rock-and-roll band

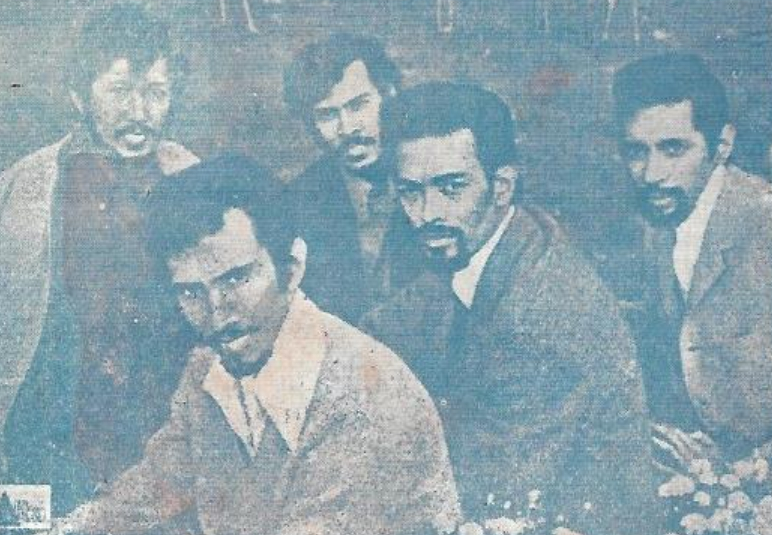
- The Tielman Brothers in 1968

Background information
- Origin: Surabaya, Indonesia
- Genres: Rock & roll; indorock; rockabilly; proto-punk
- Years active: 1947–1976
- Labels: Imperial Records, Ariola, Negram, Delta, Golden 12, Philips, EMI, Killroy, Dino
- Past members: Andy Tielman; Reggy Tielman; Ponthon Tielman; Loulou Tielman; Jane Tielman; Franky Luyten; Alphonse Faverey; Hans Bax; Robby Latuperisa; George de Fretes; Benny Heynen; Leo Masengi; Maurice de la Croix; Harry Koster; Dolf De Vries; Ilse Uchtmann; Eddy Chatelin; Frans Sahupala; Harry Berg; Erik "Ricky" Van Eldik; Alex Van Haasen; Robby Van Haasen; Guus Van Haasen; Sonja Bautz; Francess; Frans Vitalis; Max Tahalele; Wim Noya; Cornelis Nanlohy
- Website: Tielman Brothers

The Tielman Brothers were a Dutch-Indonesian rock band, whose 1958 single "Rock Little Baby of Mine" has been described as the first rock and roll single in Dutch history. Singer-guitarist Andy Tielman is the only constant member of the group through their entire career.

They first played traditional folk music before transitioning to performing western music and rock and roll. The band became famous in Europe for playing Indorock, a fusion of Indonesian and Western music with roots in Kroncong. At the height of their career, in the 1950s and early 1960s, the band was hailed as one of the greatest live acts in Europe.

They were active until disbanding in 1983, and reformed for a reunion in 1990.

== History ==
The founders of the band are the Tielman brothers, all sons of Flora Lorine Hess and Herman Tielman from Kupang, East Nusa Tenggara (NTT), Eastern Indonesia: Andy (vocals, guitar), Reggy (guitar), Ponthon (bass), and Loulou Tielman (drums). They grew up in Indonesia, where they first performed under the names Timor Brothers and the Four T's.

Although not the such first band, the Tielman Brothers were at the forefront of what was later called the Indorock scene.

=== 1950s ===
In 1956, The Tielman Brothers moved to The Netherlands, first to Breda, later to The Hague. Their performances were noted because of their spectacular stage act, which included guitar tossing.

In 1958 the band were part of the Dutch pavilion at the Brussels World Fair. They were the relief band. While the Hawaiian band took a break, the Tielman brothers were supposed to be on for just 15 minutes but took advantage of the opportunity. While on stage they excited the audience with their stage antics while tossing instruments to each other and playing the bass with their teeth etc. Their energetic stage performance drew the attention of international concert promoters, and the band was booked to play for several concerts in German night clubs, including on the Reeperbahn in Hamburg.

After the World Fair, The Tielman Brothers were signed by the Belgian record label Fernap Records to record their first single, a song called "Rock Little Baby of Mine". This is considered to be the first Dutch rock 'n' roll record released in 1958. In 1959, the band was signed to Imperial Records.

=== 1960s ===
In 1960, an additional guitarist joined the band, Frank Luyten. In Germany, the band grew out to be a popular live act. The band received there a fee of 20,000 guilders to perform for a month, and Ariola released records especially for the German market. In their wake many more indorock bands started to perform in Germany. The Tielman Brothers also performed in Austria, Switzerland, Belgium, France, Italy and Sweden. In The Netherlands, they were less successful, mainly performing in their hometown The Hague. The band got little attention from the Dutch media: a performance on the TV program Avro Weekend Show in January 1960 was criticized because they incorporated a Mozart melody (Piano Sonata No. 16) in the song "18th Century Rock".

At the beginning of 1964, Andy and Reggy were involved in a serious car accident in Germany. It marked the start of many line-up changes, with Andy Tielman as the only permanent member. Luyten and Alfons Faverey left the Tielman Brothers in 1964 to form the rhythm & blues band The Time Breakers. In 1966, The Tielman Brothers were joined by multi-instrumentalist George de Fretes, who was with them for a short period of time. Other musicians that were with the band for a short period of time include Robby Latuperisa (bass guitar), Hans Bax (guitar), Roy udy Piroeli (guitar) and Leo Masengi (saxophone).

At the end of 1967, the Tielman Brothers released the single "Little Bird", which would become their biggest hit in The Netherlands. The single reached No. 7 in the Dutch Top 40.

=== Later years ===
In later years, the Tielman Brothers moved to Australia. The move possibly came about from what they felt was racism and them not getting due credit for their efforts in the music business. The band members would occasionally return to Europe for performances. In 1983, Andy Tielman disbanded the band.

In 1990, The Tielman Brothers got together for a reunion concert. Reggy and Ponthon were not present.

In March 2014 the last remaining member, Reggy Tielman, died aged 80. His brothers Andy (in 2011), Ponthon (2000) and Loulou (1994) predeceased him.

== Discography ==
=== Singles ===
- "Rock Little Baby of Mine" (1958)
- “Record Hop” (1959)
- "18th Century Rock" (1960)
- "I Can't Forget You" (1961)
- "Tahiti Jungle" (1962)
- "Exodus" (1965)
- "Hello Caterina" (1965)
- "Little lovely lady" (1965)
- "Maria" (1965) NED: No. 20
- "No One But You" (1965)
- "White Christmas" (1965)
- "Wanderer ohne Ziel" (1966)
- "Michelle" (1966)
- "You Got Too Much Going For You" (1966)
- "Little Bird" (1967) NED: No. 7
- "Nina Don't Go" (1968)
- "Manolita" (Andy Tielman) (1970)
- "Say A Simple Word" (Andy Tielman) (1971)
- "Poor People" (feat. Andy Tielman) (1972) NED: Tip
- "With Your Help (Oh Mighty Father)" (Andy Tielman) (1972)
- "Hey Hey (Rock 'n' Roll Is In)" (1973)
- "Goodbye Mama" (Andy Tielman & The Tielman Brothers) (1975)
- "Rip It Up" (1976)
- "Gypsy Mama" (Andy Tielman) (1980)
- "Jesus" (Andy Tielman & The Tielman Brothers) (1980)
- "Cheryl Moana Marie" (Andy Tielman) (1981)
