= Dopebwoy =

Dutch rapper

- Born: Jordan Jacott; May 14, 1994 (age 32); Amsterdam, Netherlands
- Genre: Hip hop
- Occupation: Rapper
- Instrument: Vocals
- Years active: 2016–present
- Label: Warner Music Benelux

Jordan Jacott (March 14, 1994), better known by his stage name Dopebwoy, is a Dutch Surinamese rapper. Well known among other things from his number 1 single Guap in the Dutch Single Top 100, and particularly the song Cartier, that became an international hit and, at the time of release, the most streamed Dutch language songs of all time on Spotify and YouTube.

== Career ==
In April 2017, Dopebwoy released his debut album under the name Nieuw Goud, which reached 36th place in the Dutch Album Top 100. With the song Cartier, which Dopebwoy released in June 2017 together with Chivv and 3robi, he had his first hit as the song remained in the top 10 of the chart for 12 weeks. In the years that followed, Dopebwoy made several songs and collaborated with artists such as Jayh, Bizzey and Boef.

In the spring of 2020, Dopebwoy started his own label under the name Forever Lit Records, in collaboration with Warner Music Benelux. In April 2020 he released his song Christian Dior as the first song under this label. The album Hoog Seizoen soon followed, which reached 3rd place in the Dutch Album Top 100. In 2021 Dopebwoy released the single Erop Eraf, which achieved gold status.

== Discography ==
=== Albums ===
Year	Album					Comments
Year	Album	100	weeks	200	weeks	Comments
2017	Nieuw goud	36	3	-	-	Debut album
2017	Andere flex	31	13	-	-	No hits in Belgium
2019	Forever lit	1 (1wk)	73	20	34	
2020	Hoogseizoen	3	66*	29	50	

=== Singles ===
Year	Act	Song			Comments
Year	Act	Song	100	weeks	Comments
2016	Dopebwoy with Défano Holwijn, Jhorrmountain, Kevcody and Rewind	Blauwdruk Boothcamp	top 22	2	
2017	Dopebwoy with Chivv and 3robi	Cartier	5	34	top 1 in Nederlandse Top 40 / top 22 in Flemish Ultratop 50. Golden status
2017	Dopebwoy	Afstand	51	3	
2017	Dopebwoy with Jermaine Niffer and Jozo	Alles contant	75	2	
2017	Dopebwoy with Ali B and Mula B	Obesitas	58	2	top 39 in Flemish Ultratop 50
2018	Dopebwoy with Keizer	Interessant	89	1	
2018	Dopebwoy with Jayh, Jonna Fraser and Zefanio	Fluister	43	3	
2018	Dopebwoy with Yung Felix and Poke	Loco	12	32	top 26 in Flemish Ultratop 50
2018	Dopebwoy with SFB and Leafs	Drip	4	15	top 4 in Top 40 / top in Flemish Ultratop 50
2018	Dopebwoy with Jayh, Mula B and Bizzey	Bom 't	42	6	
2018	Dopebwoy with Bizzey	Salaris	98	1	
2018	Dopebwoy with $hirak, Bokoesam and Bizzey	My Money	36	11	top in Flemish Ultratop 50
2018	Dopebwoy	Trophies	68	2	
2019	Dopebwoy with Yxng Bane	Santo Domingo	29	13	
2019	Dopebwoy with 3robi and Mula B	Walou crisis	10	25	top 3 in Top 40 / top 32 in Flemish Ultratop 50
2019	Dopebwoy with Equalz and Henkie T	Ballin'	48	4	
2019	Dopebwoy with MHD	Niet alsof	21	8	
2019	Dopebwoy with Frenna	Einde van de rit	80	1	
2019	Dopebwoy with IliassOpDeBeat and LouiVos	Designers	17	17	top 27 in Flemish Ultratop 50
2019	Dopebwoy with Boef	Guap	1	19	top 1 in Top 40 / nr. 47 in Flemish Ultratop 50
2019	Dopebwoy with Boef and SRNO	TikTok	2	16	top 4 in Top 40 / top 7 in Flemish Ultratop 50
2019	Dopebwoy with Poke	Flex	65	1	
2019	Dopebwoy	Overseas	72	1	
2019	Dopebwoy with Frenna	Heel veel geld	76	1	
2019	Dopebwoy with Henkie T	Fuik	59	2	
2020	Dopebwoy with Bryan Mg and SRNO	Christian Dior	17	28	top 2 in Top 40
2020	Dopebwoy with Jack	100	84	1	
2020	Dopebwoy with Jonna Fraser	Vakantie	4	38	nr. 24 in Top 40 / top 31 in Flemish Ultratop 50
2020	Dopebwoy with 3robi, Boef and SRNO	Champagne Papi	3	10	top 2 in Top 40 / top 20 in Flemish Ultratop 50
2020	Dopebwoy with 3robi and SRNO	Marbella	35	5	
2020	Dopebwoy with Lil' Kleine	Dansen aan de gracht	14	28	top 5 in Top 40
2021	Dopebwoy	Hilton	83	1	
2021	Dopebwoy with SRNO and Broederliefde	Perro	83	2	
2021	Dopebwoy with Jonna Fraser	Erop eraf	18	17	Golden status
2021	Dopebwoy with Bizzey and Mula B	Nog steeds vies	70	1	
2021	Dopebwoy with Boef and Chivv	Domme invest	27	3	
2021	Dopebwoy with Ashafar and SRNO	Givenchy	64	1	
2021	Dopebwoy	Alcoholist	65	1	
