= Indorock =

Music genre

- Stylistic origins: Kroncong; rock and roll; surf music; instrumental rock
- Cultural origins: 1950s, the Netherlands
- Derivative forms: Nederpop

Other topics
- Music of the Netherlands

Indorock is a musical genre which originated in the 1950s in the Netherlands, fusing Indonesian and Western music. The genre has roots in Kroncong (traditional Portuguese-Indonesian fusion music), and was performed by people of the Indo community in the Netherlands, as the Dutch Empire controlled what is now Indonesia for over 300 years until the 1940s.

Indorock is one of the earliest forms of "Eurorock". Its influence on Dutch popular music was considerable. The term Indorock was used in 1981 to refer to the genre and period retrospectively.

== History ==
The guitar was imported to the East Indies by Portuguese explorers in the 16th century. The traditional Portuguese song styles, saudade and fado, played with guitar accompaniment, later evolved into kroncong music.

Many Indorock musicians were influenced by Hawaiian music, which was popular in the Netherlands in the 1950s. Other significant influences include American country & western, and the rock & roll repertoire played on radio stations in Indonesia via American (AFN) stations from the Philippines and Australia. While Dutch audience were interested in Rock & Roll, white Dutch musicians did not perform the genre in the mid-1950s, and Indonesians and Moluccans filled the void at that time, and bands such as the Bellboys, the Room Rockers, the Hap Cats, and the Hot Jumpers performing to a mixed audience in venues such as pubs.

The Tielman Brothers (Reggy, Ponthon, Andy and Loulou Tielman) are generally seen as founders of Indorock, even though other Indorock bands existed before them. Being ethnically Indonesian and playing black American music to white audiences in the Netherlands and Germany, their music exemplifies the complex background of the style, which, according to George Lipsitz, is shaped by "the histories of Dutch and U.S. military combat in Asia and Europe" and by the "internalized racial histories of the United States, the Netherlands, and Germany". Since the Dutch music industry offered few venues for Indorock artists, many of them went to Germany where it quickly became highly popular, at least until the advent of British beat music.

The Indorock scene had largely faded in the Netherlands by the mid-1960s, as it was superseded in popularity by British rock as a result of the British Invasion. However, it would continue to be an influence in Indonesian rock music. Indorock has also been considered by some to be an early form of proto-punk, as some of its stylistic elements are similar to those in the punk rock movement of the 1970s.

== Notable indorock artists ==
- Tielman Brothers (1957)
- Bintangs (1961)
- Black Dynamites (Los Indonesios) (1958)
