= Jozo Pavič =

Croatian footballer

Personal information
- Full name: Jože Pavič
- Date of birth: 1969 (age 56–57)
- Position: Defender

Senior career*
Years	Team	Apps	(Gls)
1992–1993	Osijek	7	(0)
1993–1994	Zadar	15	(0)
1996	HNK Dubrovnik		
1997–1999	Tauris Rimavská Sobota	65	(0)
1999-2000	Orkan Dugi Rat		
- * Club domestic league appearances and goals

Jozo Pavič (born 1969) is a retired Croatian football defender.
