= Adje =

Dutch rapper

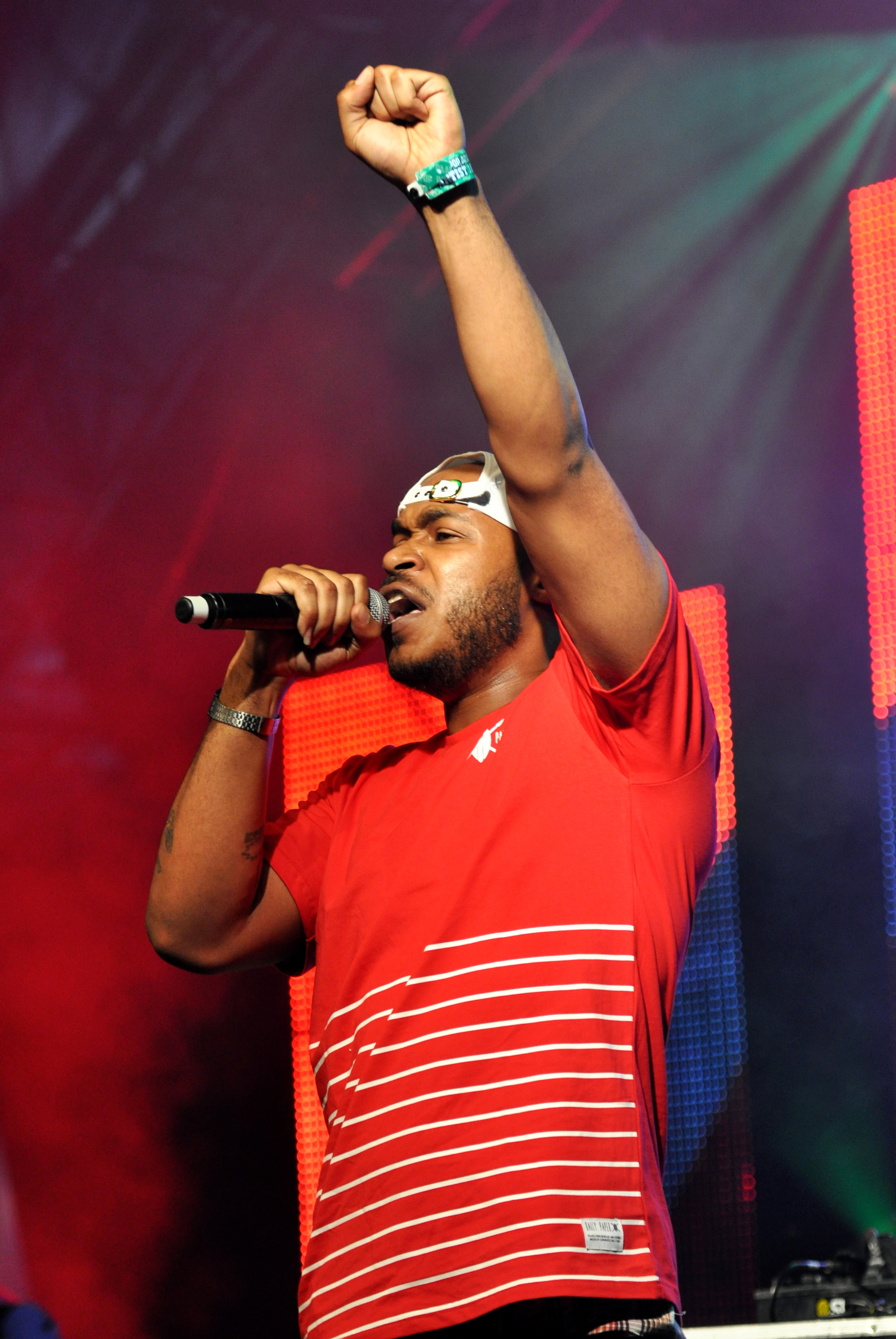
- Adje in 2014

Background information
- Also known as: Ado'nis, Adjedonnie
- Born: Julmar Simons; October 2, 1982 (age 44); Amsterdam, Netherlands
- Genre: Hip hop
- Occupation: Rapper
- Instrument: Vocals
- Years active: 2008–present
- Labels: TopNotch, Streetknowledge Music

Julmar Simons (born October 2, 1982), known professionally as Adje (or Ado'nis), is a Dutch rapper.

== Career ==
Simons was born on October 2, 1982 in Amsterdam to a Curaçaoan mother and a Surinamese father. He is the half-brother of fellow rappers Hef and Crooks. He grew up in the neighborhood Bijlmermeer. Influenced by the music of Michael Jackson and later Snoop Dogg, he decided to also make hip hop music. Initially he wrote in English, but after he came into contact with the Tuindorp Hustler Click from Amsterdam-Noord, he started rapping in Dutch and was featured on their underground hit "Zonder Berouw". In 2008, he released his first mixtape Who the f*ck is Ado'nis?. The same year, he and his brothers Hef and Crooks released their mixtape Boyz in de hood vol. 1.

In 2013, he released his debut studio album Vossig. The album was entirely produced by Reverse and features a guest appearance from Jamaican singer Beenie Man. It reached number 14 in the Dutch Album Top 100.

On 8 December 2017, he was featured on the hit song "Coño" by Puri and Jhorrmountain. On 3 July 2020, the song was covered by Jason Derulo.

== Discography ==
Studio albums

- Vossig (2013)
- Streetknowledge (2017)

Collaboration albums

- Alles Groot (with Architrackz) (2018)
- BASE (with Roselilah) (2018)
- Boyz in the Hood 2 (with Hef and Crooks) (2021)
- Legacy (with Reverse) (2022)
