= Jozo =

Jozo is a Croatian masculine given name, cognate to Josip and in turn Joseph.

It may refer to:

- Jozo Alebić, Croatian sprinter
- Jozo Bogdanović, Yugoslav footballer
- Jozo Brkić, Bosnian basketball player
- Jozo Kljaković, Croatian painter, writer illustrator, and cartoonist
- Jozo Križanović, Bosnian politician
- Jozo Matovac, Swedish footballer
- Jozo Matošić, Croatian footballer and coach
- Jozo Pavič, Croatian footballer
- Jozo Penava, Bosnian composer, producer and musician
- Jozo Radoš, Canadian politician
- Jozo Raz, Slovak musician
- Jozo Šimunović, Croatian footballer
- Jozo Špikić, Bosnian footballer
- Jozo Stanić, football player
- Jozo Tomašević, Croatian American historian
- Jozo Zovko, Franciscan from Herzegovina
