= Coño (song) =

Single by Jason Derulo, Puri, and Jhorrmountain
- Released: July 3, 2020
- Length: 1:51
- Label: Spinnin'
- Songwriters: Jason Derulo; Adje; Jhorrmountain; Gilian Chen; Akshe Puri; Shawn Charles
- Producers: Jason Derulo; Jhorrmountain; Puri

Jason Derulo singles chronology
"Savage Love (Laxed – Siren Beat)" (2020)	"Coño" (2020)	"Don't Cry for Me" (2020)

"Coño" (Note: Coño is a Spanish vulgar slang term for the vagina; see Spanish profanity § Coño.) is a cover song by American singer Jason Derulo and Dutch producers Puri and Jhorrmountain. It was released as a single on July 3, 2020 by Spinnin' Records. The original Dutch version was written by Adje, Jhorrmountain, Gilian Chen and Akshe Puri, while for the cover additional writing was done by Jason Derulo and Shawn Charles. The original "Coño" by Puri is featuring Jhorrmountain and Adje and was released on December 8, 2017; it became a hit in its country of origin, the Netherlands. In the covered version all the Dutch lyrics by Adje were replaced by new English lyrics by Jason Derulo, but the Dutch Lyrics of the chorus by Jhorrmountain remained.

== Background ==
This version is the fourth release of the song, all iterations including production by Dutch producer/DJ Puri, and was preceded by the 2017 release "PURI X Jhorrmountain X Adje - Coño", the 2018 remix "PURI X Sneakbo X Lisa Mercedez Feat. Jhorrmountain X Adje - Coño", and the following 2019 release/remix "Ceky Viciny x Puri x El Bloonel - Coño".

In an interview with Forbes, Derulo said, "'Coño' is a similar thing [to Derulo single 'Savage Love']," and went on to write English lyrics with the producers.

== Personnel ==
- Jason Derulo – producer, programmer, writer
- Jhorrmountain – producer, programmer, writer
- Puri – producer, programmer, writer
- Gilian Chen – writer
- Adje – writer
- Shawn Charles – writer

== Charts ==
=== Weekly charts ===
Weekly chart performance for "Coño"
Chart (2020)	Peak position
Argentina Hot 100 (Billboard)	23
Austria (Ö3 Austria Top 40)	42
Belgium (Ultratip Bubbling Under Flanders)	30
France (SNEP)	61
Germany (GfK)	47
Ireland (IRMA)	82
Netherlands (Single Top 100)	52
Scotland Singles (Official Charts)	90
Switzerland (Schweizer Hitparade)	74
UK Singles (Official Charts)	55
US Hot Dance/Electronic Songs (Billboard)	8

=== Year-end charts ===
Year-end chart performance for "Coño"
Chart (2020)	Position
US Hot Dance/Electronic Songs (Billboard)	29

== Certifications ==
Certifications for "Coño"
Region	Certification	Certified units/sales
Austria (IFPI Austria)	Gold	15,000^{‡}
Canada (Music Canada)	3× Platinum	240,000^{‡}
France (SNEP)	Gold	100,000^{‡}
Germany (BVMI)	Gold	200,000^{‡}
Italy (FIMI)	Gold	35,000^{‡}
United Kingdom (BPI)	Silver	200,000^{‡}
^{‡} Sales+streaming figures based on certification alone.

== Release history ==
Release history and formats for "Coño"
Region	Date	Format	Label	Ref.
Various	July 3, 2020	Digital download; streaming	Spinnin'	
