= 3robi =

Dutch-Moroccan rapper (born 1995)

- Born: Anass Haouam; 24 January 1995 (age 31); Amsterdam, Netherlands
- Genre: Hip hop
- Occupation: Rapper
- Instrument: Vocals
- Years active: 2013–present
- Labels: Spow Business; Wild West

Anass Haouam (born 24 January 1995), better known by his stage name 3robi, is a Dutch-Moroccan rapper. Born in Amsterdam, he started his musical career in 2014. His debut studio album, Jonge jongen naar de top, was released in 2017 and reached number one on the Dutch Album Top 100. In 2019, 3robi founded his own record label Spow Business and released his second album the next year.

== Early life ==
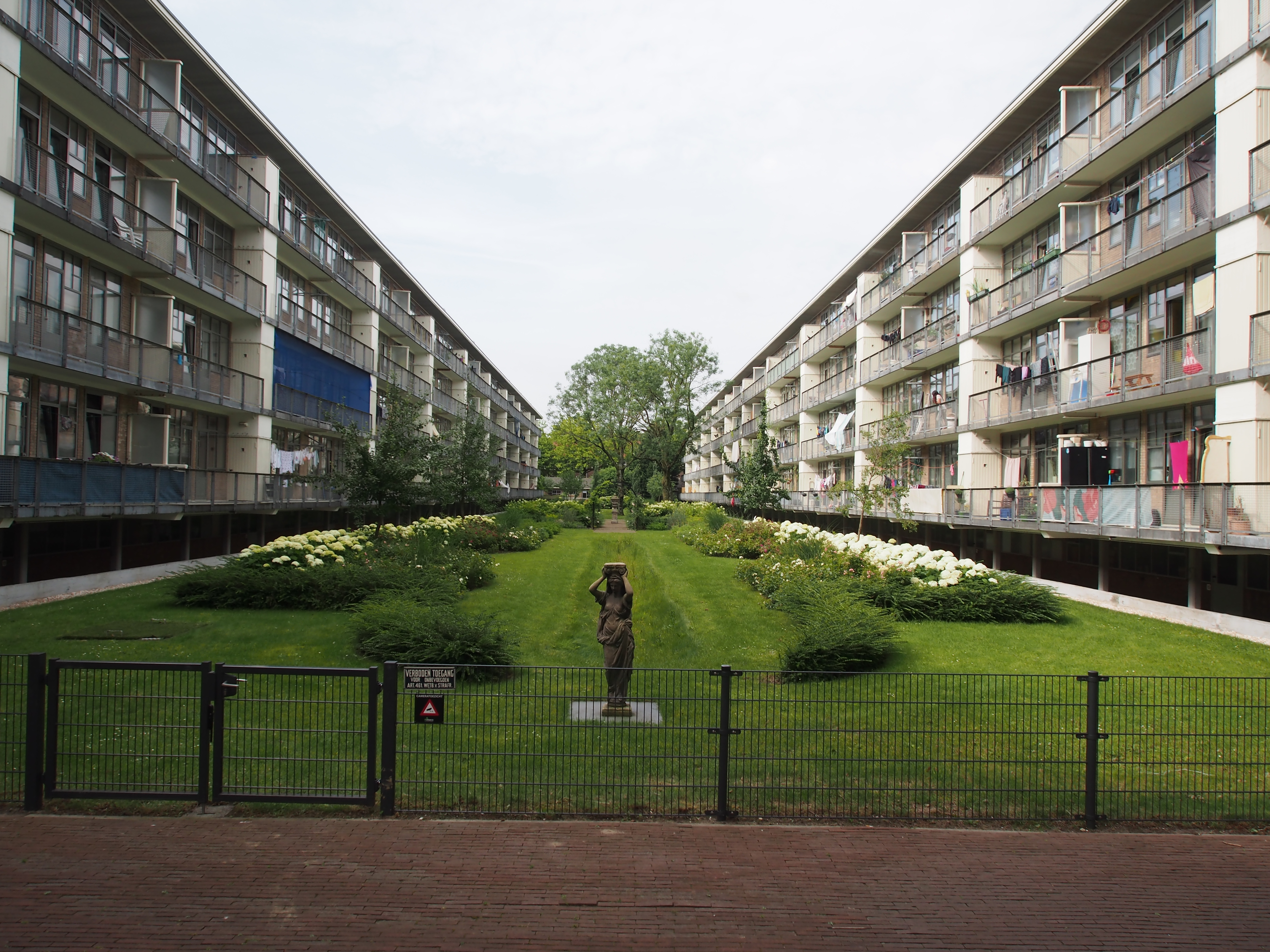
Bos en Lommer in Amsterdam-West, where 3robi grew up.

Anass Haouam was born and raised in Bos en Lommer, Amsterdam to Moroccan parents. From the age of twelve to nineteen, he resided in IJburg in Amsterdam-Oost. He has three brothers: Yassine, Sami and Aim. Yassine is a record producer and has produced multiple songs for him under the name YassineBeats. Sami is a football player, while Aim is a rapper and frequently collaborates with him. Anass was given the nickname 3robi in his teenage years by his friends, being the only Moroccan from Casablanca in his neighborhood. It designates the inhabitants of the countryside which surrounds his town of origin. In his youth, he showed interest in rap and football, and is inspired by Dutch rappers Sjaak and Naffer.

== Career ==
=== 2013–2018: Beginnings and Jonge jongen naar de top ===
Starting his career in 2013, 3robi achieved his first success in 2017 with the single "Sinds een puber" featuring LouiVos and Kingsize, which reached number 97 on the Dutch Single Top 100. Since then, 3robi has collaborated with artists such as Mula B, Dopebwoy and Yung Felix. In 2017, he featured on the single "Cartier" by Dopebwoy along with Chivv, which peaked at number five in the Dutch chart and has become his highest-charting single in the country so far.

In December 2017, he released his debut album titled Jonge jongen naar de top, which reached number one on the Dutch Album Top 100.

=== 2019–present: Jonge jongen naar de top 2 ===
In 2019, after leaving the Wild West record label, 3robi established his own Spow Business label. The first artist that was signed was his brother Aim. While talking about leaving Wild West, 3robi said: "I thought if I put in more effort, I can fix it all myself. I have a vision and everything I've achieved so far, I've done myself. Also with help, but I did it myself. There is no help in the Netherlands to make us bigger artists. There is not really a label that grabs you and immediately wants to make you a star. It is always more for themselves. [...] I have been an artist for many years now and I have been to so many places. I can do it myself, man."

In 2020, his second album, Jonge jongen naar de top 2, was released. In 2022, 3robi released the collaborative album Flex Mood with record producer SRNO.

== Discography ==
=== Studio albums ===
List of studio albums, with selected details and chart positions
Title	Album details	Peak chart positions	
Title	Album details	NLD	BEL (Fl)
Jonge jongen naar de top	Released: 8 December 2017; Label: Wild West; Formats: CD, digital download	1	38
Jonge jongen naar de top 2	Released: 18 December 2020; Label: Spow Business; Formats: CD, digital download	19	48

=== Collaborative albums ===
List of studio albums, with selected details and chart positions
Title	Album details	Peak chart positions	
Title	Album details	NLD	BEL (Fl)
Flex Mood (with SRNO)	Released: 4 March 2022; Label: Spow Business; Formats: CD, digital download	21	91

== Awards and nominations ==
Year	Awards	Category	Nominated work	Result
2017	FunX Music Awards	Best Collaboration	"Domme Boys" (with Mula B and Louis)	Nominated
2018	FunX Music Awards	Best Collaboration	"Cartier" (with Dopebwoy and Chivv)	Nominated
2021	FunX Music Awards	Best Collaboration	"Validé" (with Bryan Mg and SRNO)	Nominated
2022	FunX Music Awards	Best Song	"Montana" (with SRNO, Henkie T and Bryan Mg)	Nominated
2022	FunX Music Awards	Best Album	Flex Mood (with SRNO)	Nominated
