= Nederpop =

Style of Dutch pop music

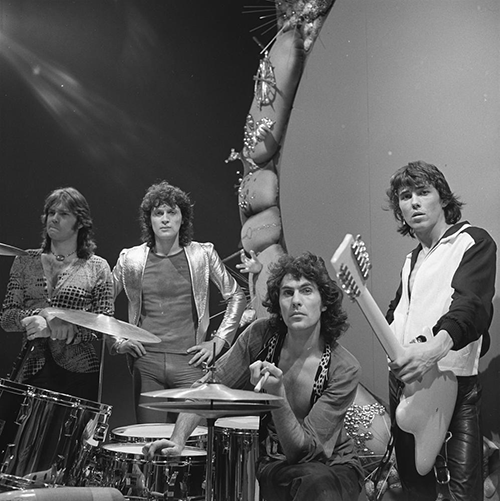
- Golden Earring in 1974
- Stylistic origins: Pop; rock; Indorock
- Cultural origins: Early 1960s

Subgenres
- Levenslied; Nederbeat; Palingpop

Nederpop (Dutch: [ˈneː.dərˌpɔp]) or Dutch pop music is pop music made by Dutch bands and artists.

The name is a portmanteau on the country's name in Dutch (Nederland) and pop. An English translation could be Netherpop. Nederpop is a Dutch term invented by the mid-1970s to describe the Dutch pop music scene of the 1960s and 1970s that was gaining worldwide attention, exemplified by bands such as Shocking Blue, Golden Earring and Focus. Most of the Nederpop bands of this period had English-language songs or played only instrumentals, but some of the bands performed exclusively in the Dutch language. Many such were popular thanks to airplay over the offshore pirate radio stations targeting the Netherlands such as Mi Amigo, Veronica, Atlantis and Northsea International.

During the early 1980s, the Nederpop term was revived to name the sudden growth of Dutch language pop music from the Netherlands. The revived meaning came about because of the huge success of Doe Maar. This success helped other bands to sing in Dutch and/or get the spotlight.

== Sixties Nederpop bands ==
- Golden Earring
- The Motions
- The Outsiders
- Tee-Set
- Cuby + Blizzards
- Brainbox
- The Cats
- Sandy Coast
- The Shoes
- Peter Koelewijn
- Boudewijn de Groot
- Rob de Nijs

== Seventies Nederpop bands ==
- Shocking Blue
- Mouth & MacNeal
- Focus
- Earth and Fire
- George Baker
- Golden Earring
- Ekseption
- Luv'
- De Bintangs
- Supersister
- Pussycat
- Teach-In
- Livin' Blues
- Kayak
- Herman Brood
- Gruppo Sportivo
- Alquin
- Normaal
- BZN
- Nits

== Eighties Nederpop bands ==
Aside from Doe Maar, the early eighties were good for, amongst others, Golden Earring, Time Bandits (band), Diesel (band), Vandenberg, the Frank Boeijen Groep, Het Goede Doel, the Amazing Stroopwafels, Toontje Lager, VOF de Kunst, Drukwerk and Noodweer.

Female Nederpop bands of the time included the Dolly Dots and Mai Tai.

== Later Nederpop ==
- Acda & de Munnik
- Luie hond
- Osdorp Posse
- De Dijk
- Van Dik Hout
- Bløf
- The Scene
- De Poema's (coöperation of Van Dik Hout and Acda & de Munnik)
- Spinvis
- Ellen ten Damme

== Nederpop bands singing in regional languages ==
- Heidevolk, Dutch
- Normaal, Low German
- Rowwen Hèze, Limburgian
- Skik, Drèents dialects
- Twarres, West Frisian
- De Kast, West Frisian
- Mooi Wark, Drenthe

== See also ==
- Dutch rock
- Nederbeat
- Europop
