= Little Green Bag (album) =

Studio album by George Baker Selection
- Released: February 1970
- Recorded: January–October 1969
- Studios: Eclipse Studios, Netherlands
- Genre: Nederbeat
- Length: 40:56
- Labels: Negram; Discostar; Colossus
- Producers: Hans Bouwens; Richard De Bois

George Baker Selection chronology
Little Green Bag (1970)	Midnight (1970)

Professional ratings
Review scores
Source	Rating
AllMusic	4.5/5 stars

Little Green Bag is the 1970 debut album by the Dutch rock band George Baker Selection. It attracted additional attention after Quentin Tarantino used the title track on his 1992 movie Reservoir Dogs.

== Track list ==
All tracks are written by Hans Bouwens, except where noted.

No.	Title	Length
1.	"Little Green Bag" (Jan Visser, Hans Bouwens)	4:20
2.	"Winter Time"	2:07
3.	"Funny Girl"	3:00
4.	"The Prisoner"	4:48
5.	"Road Of Peace"	2:56
6.	"Pancake 6" (Known as "Fly" outside the Netherlands)	2:50
7.	"Dear Ann"	3:04
8.	"Impressions"	3:30
9.	"I Wanna Love You"	2:50
10.	"Have Another Drink"	3:22
11.	"I'll Be Your Baby Tonight" (Bob Dylan)	4:09
12.	"Goodbye"	4:00

== Personnel ==
- George Baker – electric guitar, acoustic guitar, rhythm guitar, piano, lead vocals
- Job Netten – electric guitar, acoustic guitar, lead guitar
- Jaques Greuter – hammond organ, electric guitar, acoustic guitar, triangle
- Jan Visser – bass guitar, backing vocals
- Hank Kramer – saxophone, tambourine, drums
- Ton Vreedenburg – drums

== Production ==
- Design [Grafik – Design]– Ariola-Eurodisc-Atelier*, Kortemeier, Vormstein* *

== Charts ==
Chart (1970)	Peak position
US Billboard Top LPs	107
