= George Baker Selection =

Dutch pop rock band

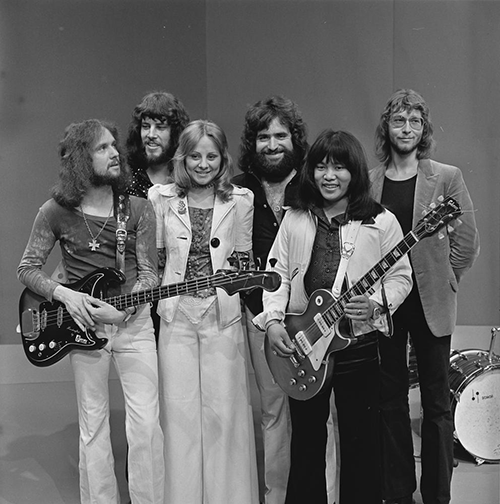
- George Baker Selection in 1974

Background information
- Also known as: Soul Invention
- Origin: Assendelft, Netherlands
- Genres: Palingsound; Nederpop; Nederbeat; Pop rock; Soft rock
- Years active: 1967–1978; 1982–1989
- Label: Negram
- Past members: George Baker; Henk Kramer; Jacques Greuter; Jan Visser; George Thé; Jan Hop; Martin Schoen; Lida Bond
- Website: georgebaker.com

George Baker Selection was a Dutch pop-rock band from Assendelft. The band is best-known for the 1969 song "Little Green Bag", the 1975 world-wide hit "Paloma Blanca", and the 1985 Pan European hit "Santa Lucia by Night".

== History ==
In 1968, Hans Bouwens from Wormerveer joined the band Soul Invention, a soul band that had been founded the previous year by Henk Kramer in Assendelft and played covers of songs by Otis Redding and Sam and Dave. The band consisted of Job Netten (guitar), Henk Kramer and Eric Bardoen (saxophone), Jacques Greuter (keyboard and flute), Theo Vermast and later Jan Visser (bass), and Ton Vredenburg (drums). Visser and Bouwens wrote the song "Little Greenback" [sic] in the summer of 1969. The band recorded their first album in September 1969, after which, considering this was not soul music, they changed their name to The George Baker Selection, Bouwens naming himself for a character from a detective novel. This first album, Little Green Bag (1970), produced an immediate worldwide hit: their debut single, "Little Green Bag," reached No. 16 on the Cash Box magazine chart and No. 21 on the Billboard Hot 100 in the United States. The success came as a surprise for Baker, who remembers hearing it on the radio while he was working in a lemonade factory. The single sold over one million copies globally and received a gold disc. A string of singles and albums followed; the second single, "Dear Ann," was such a success that Baker resigned from his job in the lemonade factory and became a full-time musician. Not all band members followed suit and, besides Bouwens, the Selection from mid-1970 was formed by Jan Visser, Jan Hop (drums), Jacques Greuter and George Thé (voice, guitar, bass). In March 1971 Jan Visser left the band to be replaced by Cor Veerman. Besides scoring hits with his own Selection, Baker wrote songs for others, including BZN, The Shoes, Andy Star, and Next One. In 1974, singer Lida Bond joined the Selection, and combining her voice with Baker's proved highly successful.

Their fifth album, Paloma Blanca, was released in 1975, and the single "Paloma Blanca" reached No. 1 on charts in several countries. It sold more than seven million copies worldwide, making it one of the most successful Dutch singles ever.

In 1978, the George Baker Selection split up because "the pressure had become too much." The band has sold over 20 million records worldwide. George Baker formed a new George Baker Selection in 1982, which stayed together until 1989. The band has released twelve albums and several compilation albums.

The band experienced a brief return to the international charts in 1992 when the song "Little Green Bag" was used in the title sequence of the film Reservoir Dogs and in Machos, a Chilean soap opera in 2003. The song is also featured in a Moto X smartphone commercial circa 2013.

== Members ==
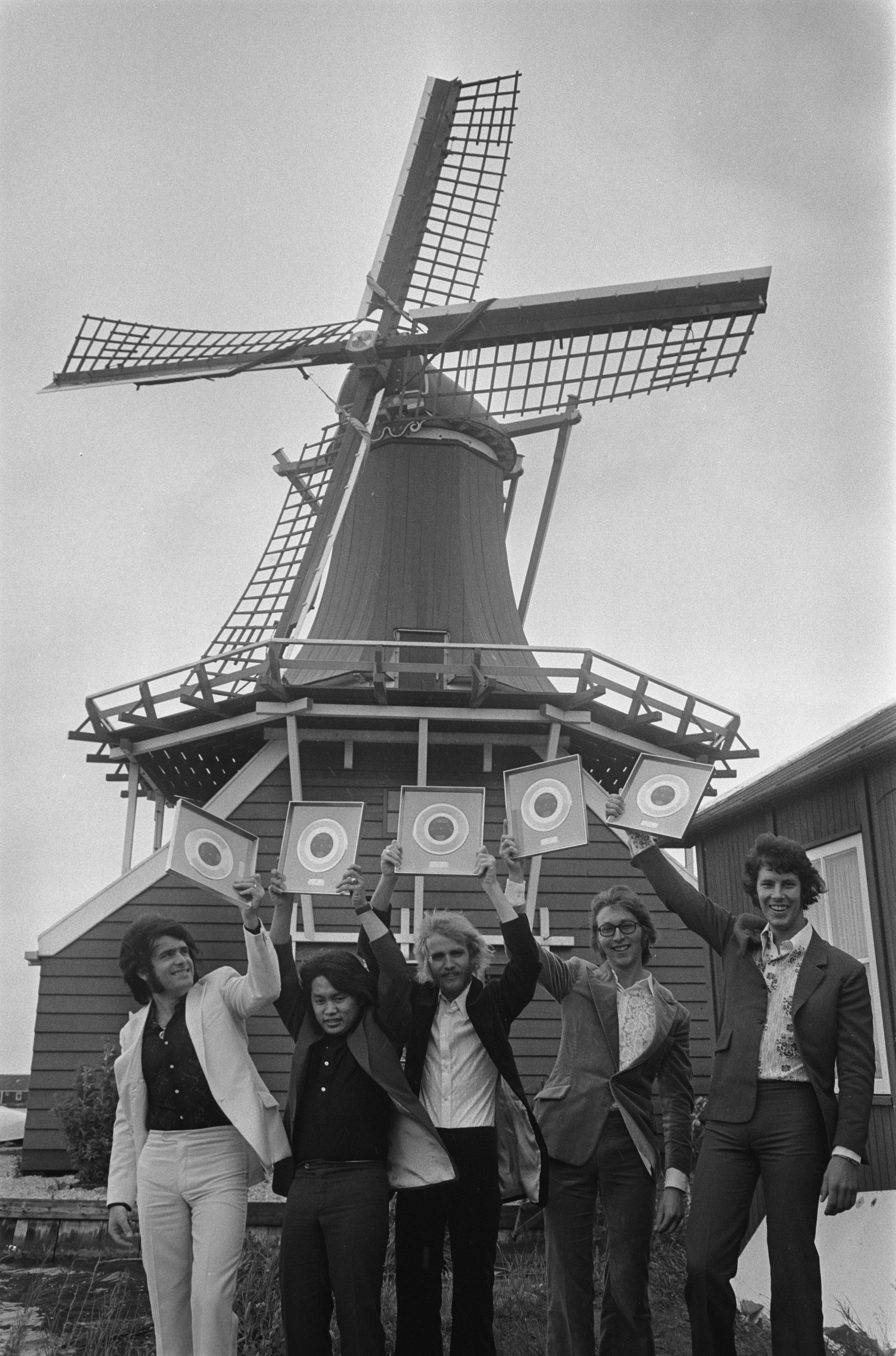
1 million copies sold of Little Green Bag.

- Hans Bouwens (as George Baker) (composer, vocals, guitar, mandolin, flute, piano and organ) 1968–1977, 1982–1989
- Elly Bloothoofd (vocals, guitar) 1982–1989
- Lida Bond (vocals) 1974–1977
- Nelleke Brzoskowsky (vocals) 1982–1989
- Willy Delano (vocals) 1977, 1982–1989
- Pieter Goeman (organ and piano) 1982–1989
- Jacques Greuter (vocals, organ, flute and piano) 1967–1982
- Jan Hop (drums) 1969–1977, 1983–1989
- Henk Kramer (saxophone) 1967–1970
- Nathalie Más (vocals) 1977–1982
- Job Netten (guitar) 1967–1970
- Martin Schoen (bass) 1974–1982
- George Thé (vocals, guitar and bass) 1970–1977, 1983–1989
- Cor Veerman (as Alan Decker) (bass) 1971–1974
- Theo Vermast (bass) 1967–1968
- Jan Visser (bass) 1968–1971
- Ton Vredenburg (drums) 1967–1970

== Discography ==
=== Studio albums ===
Albums on Negram recording label, except as noted.

Year	Album	Peak chart positions			
Year	Album	NLD	AUT	GER	SWE
1970	Little Green Bag	—	—	—	—
1970	Love in the World	—	—	—	—
1972	Now	—	—	—	—
1972	Holy Day (Reprise)	—	—	—	—
1974	Hot Baker	2	—	—	—
1975	Paloma Blanca	1	4	1	3
1975	A Song for You	1	—	—	15
1975	Morning Sky - Mein Lied für Sie	—	—	22	—
1976	River Song (Warner Bros.)	1	—	43	30
1976	So Lang die Sonne Scheint	—	—	—	—
1977	Summer Melody	2	—	—	—
1983	Paradise Island (Dureco Benelux)	28	—	—	—
1985	Santa Lucia by Night (CNR)	4	—	—	—
1987	Viva America (Red Bullet)	8	—	—	—
1988	From Russia with Love (CNR)	81	—	—	—
"—" denotes an extended play that did not chart or was not released.

=== Compilations ===
- 5 Jaar Hits (1974) NL No. 3
- The Best Of Baker (1977) NL No. 8
- Het komplete hitoverzicht (1986) NL No. 12
- Dreamboat (1988) NL No. 21
- The Very Best Of (1999) NL No. 24
- George Baker Selection 100 NL No. 67
- The Golden Years Of Dutch Pop Music NL No. 68

=== Singles ===
Year	Single	Peak positions											Album
Year	Single	NL	AUS	BE (Fl)	CAN	CAN AC	GER	NZ	UK	US	US AC	US Country	Album
1969	"Little Green Bag"	9	12	3	16	—	—	15	—	21	—	—	Little Green Bag
1970	"Dear Ann"	2	37	1	—	—	—	12	—	93	—	—	Little Green Bag
1970	"Midnight"	12	—	14	—	—	—	—	—	—	—	—	Love In The World
1970	"Over and Over"	7	—	7	—	—	—	—	—	—	—	—	Love In The World
1970	"I Wanna Love You"	—	—	—	—	—	—	—	—	103	—	—	
1971	"Nathalie"	11	—	16	—	—	—	—	—	—	—	—	Now!
1971	"Mama Oh Mama"	9	—	21	—	—	—	—	—	—	—	—	Now!
1972	"Holy Day"	10	—	11	—	—	31	—	—	—	—	—	
1972	"I'm On My Way"	7	—	2	—	—	33	—	—	—	—	—	
1972	"Marie-Jeanne"	9	—	9	—	—	49	14	—	—	—	—	
1973	"Morning Light"	20	—	—	—	—	—	—	—	—	—	—	Hot Baker
1973	"Drink Drink Drink"	18	—	19	—	—	—	—	—	—	—	—	Hot Baker
1974	"Baby Blue"	8	29	30	—	—	—	1	—	—	—	—	Hot Baker
1974	"(Fly Away) Little Paraquayo"	2	—	2	—	—	—	—	—	—	—	—	Hot Baker
1974	"Sing A Song Of Love"	1	—	1	—	—	—	—	—	—	—	—	
1975	"Paloma Blanca"	1	2	1	10	1	1	1	10	26	1	33	Paloma Blanca
1975	"Rose Marie"	—	35	—	—	—	—	—	—	—	—	—	Paloma Blanca
1975	"Morning Sky"	1	—	1	—	—	2	19	—	—	—	—	A Song for You
1976	"Wild Bird"	3	—	5	—	—	7	25	—	—	—	—	River Song
1976	"Silver"	—	—	—	—	—	34	—	—	—	—	—	River Song
1977	"Mañana (Mi amor)"	5	—	14	—	—	—	—	—	—	—	—	Summer Melody
1977	"Beautiful Rose"	3	—	3	—	—	24	—	—	—	—	—	Summer Melody
1982	"When We're Dancing"	23	—	—	—	—	—	—	—	—	—	—	Paradise Island
1983	"The Wind (Ay, Ay, Ay, Maria)"	19	—	31	—	—	—	—	—	—	—	—	Paradise Island
1985	"Santa Lucia by Night"	7	—	12	—	—	31	—	—	—	—	—	Santa Lucia by Night
1985	"Manolito"	30	—	—	—	—	—	—	—	—	—	—	Santa Lucia by Night
1987	"Viva America"	25	—	—	—	—	—	—	—	—	—	—	Viva America
1987	"Bella Maria"	37	—	—	—	—	—	—	—	—	—	—	Viva America
"—" denotes an extended play that did not chart or was not released.
