= Wally Tax =

Dutch musician (1948–2005)

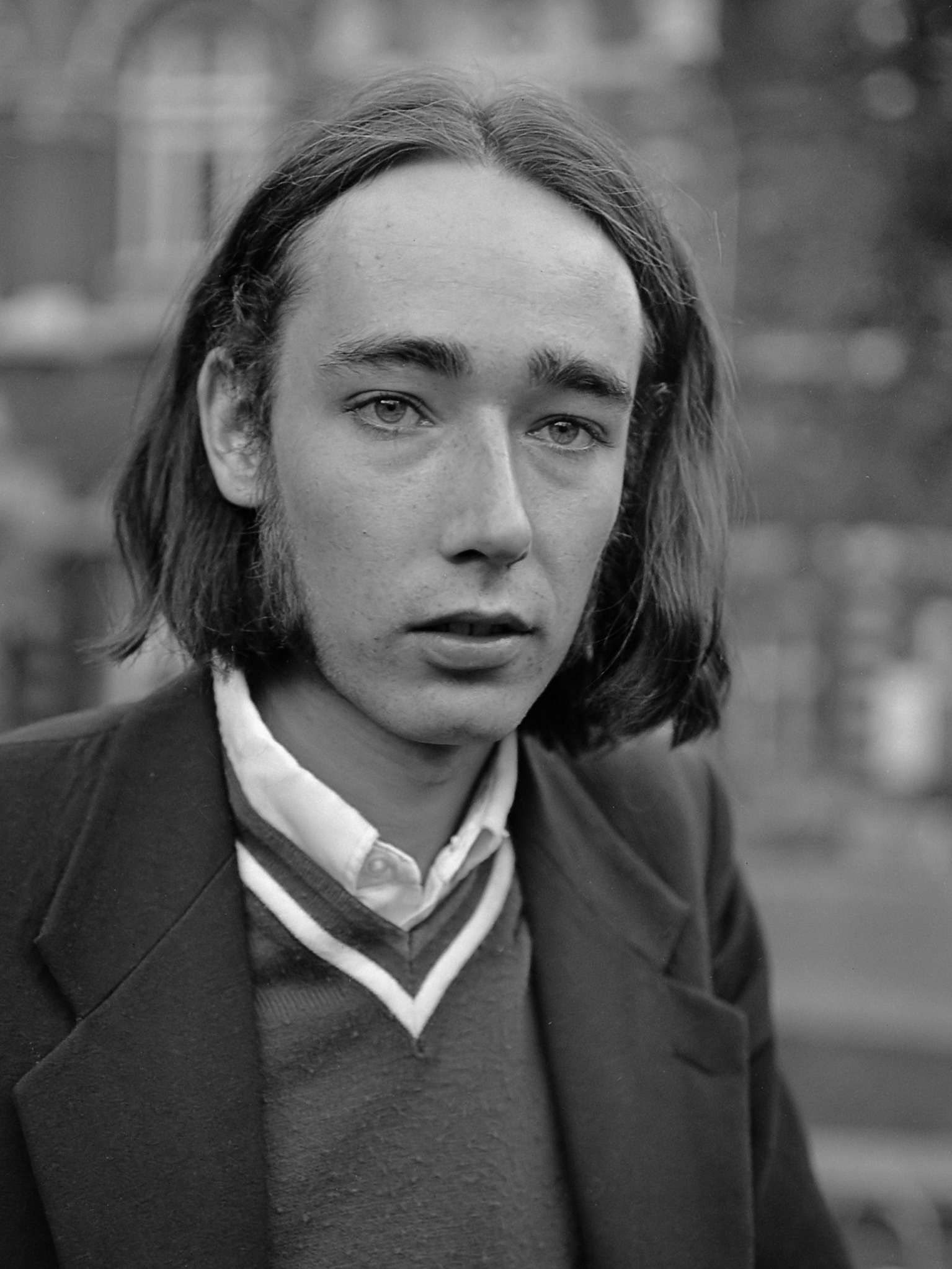
- Tax in 1969

Background information
- Born: Wladimir Tax; 14 February 1948; Amsterdam, Netherlands
- Died: 10 April 2005 (aged 57) Amsterdam, Netherlands
- Instruments: guitar, harmonica
- Years active: 1959–2001

Wladimir "Wally" Tax (Dutch pronunciation: [ˈʋlaːdimir ˈʋɑli ˈtɑks]; 14 February 1948 – 10 April 2005) was a Dutch singer and songwriter. He was founder and frontman of the Nederbeat group The Outsiders (1959–1969) and the rock group Tax Free (1969–1971).

After commercial and artistic success with The Outsiders in the late 1960s, he had a brief solo career in the 1970s, and then was a successful songwriter, producing a number of hit songs for Dutch artists. He faded into obscurity in the 1980s; after his death in 2005, two benefit concerts in Amsterdam proved his lasting popularity and influence.

== Early life ==
Wladimir Tax was born on 14 February 1948 in Amsterdam in the Netherlands. His Dutch father and his Russian Romani mother had met in a concentration camp during World War II. He grew up in Amsterdam and learned English at an early age from contacts with American sailors, for whom he acted as a pimp.

== Music career ==
=== The Outsiders ===
In 1959, at age 11, he was one of the founding members of the beat band The Outsiders. The band sang English lyrics, with Tax as the main songwriter; Tax sang and played guitar and harmonica. Even while playing with The Outsiders, Tax recorded a solo album (with a symphonic orchestra), Love-In.

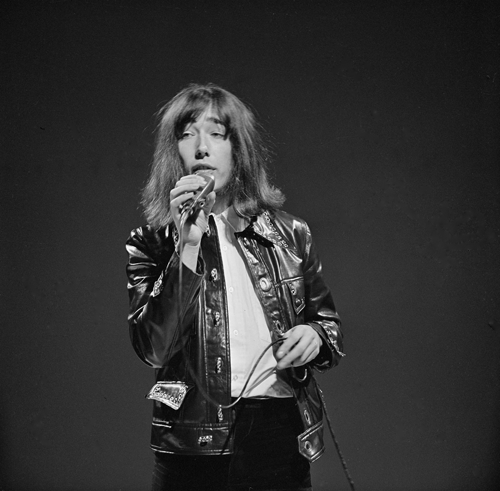
Tax performing for TV in 1968

The Outsiders reached a measure of success, opening up for The Rolling Stones in 1966 and scoring a number of hits in the Netherlands. They were one of the best-known bands of the Nederbeat movement — when they signed with Phonogram Records in 1968, Billboard reported on it. Leading what Billboard called "the leading Dutch beat group," Tax had a high-profile—he was reported to have the longest hair in the country, and lived a lavish lifestyle involving expensive dinners, chauffeur-driven cars, and friendships with Little Richard and Johnny Hallyday, as well as rumors of an affair with Brigitte Bardot.

Although The Outsiders' records were not distributed in the United States, Tax did go overseas and made friends with notable musicians such as Tim Hardin, Richie Havens, and Crosby, Stills, Nash & Young, and attended the Woodstock Festival. He played with Hardin and Jimi Hendrix at the latter's Electric Ladyland Studio. As he explained in his 1998 autobiography, success came too quick for him, and alcohol and drugs took their toll, and combined with a lack of financial security (he admitted not being good at bookkeeping since his "way of life" had killed too many brain cells) the next decades of Tax's life were chaotic.

After recording three albums, The Outsiders broke up in 1969.

In 1997 The Outsiders came together for the last time to play a reunion tour in the Netherlands. The tour was short-lived because of Tax's unpredictable behavior. Jerome Blanes wrote Outsiders by Insiders around this time, the official biography of the band.

=== Solo career ===
Tax, after briefly heading a band called Tax Free, went solo. He was accompanied, in succession, by Bamboule (1972), George Cash (1973), Watermen (1973), and The Mustangs (1976). In 1974, he won the Silver Harp, an award for musical talent and had significant success with a couple of solo singles, "Miss Wonderful" and "It ain't no use". The end of his playing career was "Let's Dance" (1977), which became a minor hit in the Netherlands. Fourteen years after "Tax Tonight", in 1989, he recorded his fourth solo album with The Music. The album was very well received by critics but the sales were low. It takes until 2002 before his next and last solo effort was released. On "The Entertainer" Tax made a musical return to his rock roots. Again well received by critics, "The Entertainer" was not the success Tax hoped for. On the album Tax sings about his life as 'an entertainer' who is mostly misunderstood by his public.

=== Songwriting ===
After his playing career had ended, he concerned himself mainly with songwriting and wrote a number of hits for Dutch artists such as Lee Towers ("It's Raining in my Heart") and Champagne ("Valentino", "Oh Me Oh My Goodbye", and "Rock 'n Roll Star", the latter charting at #2 in the Netherlands and #83 in the United States).

== Personal decline and death ==
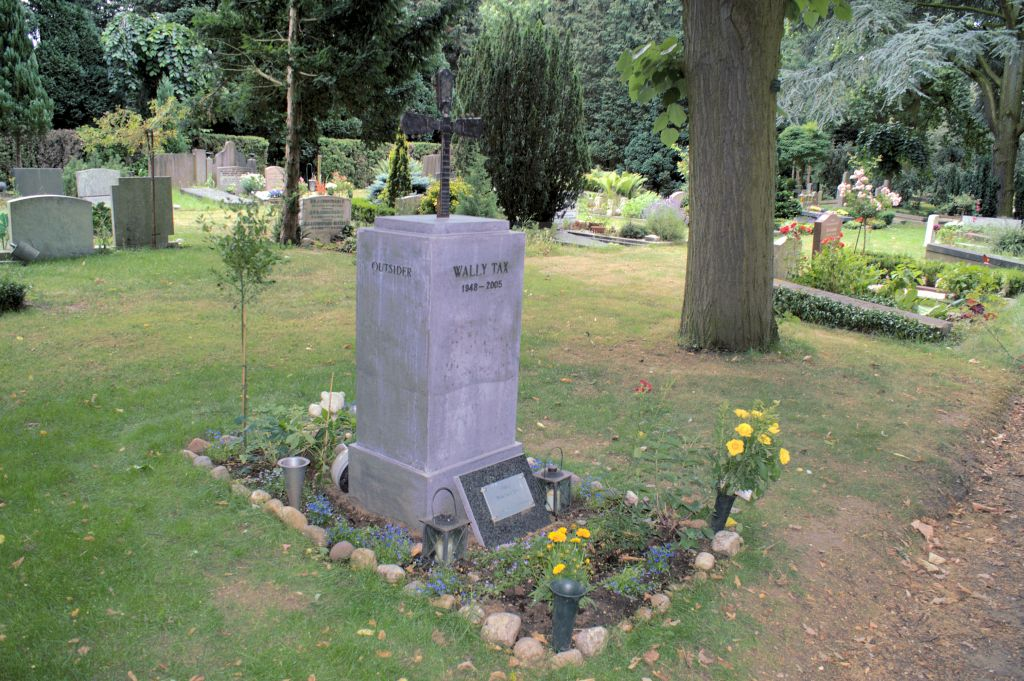
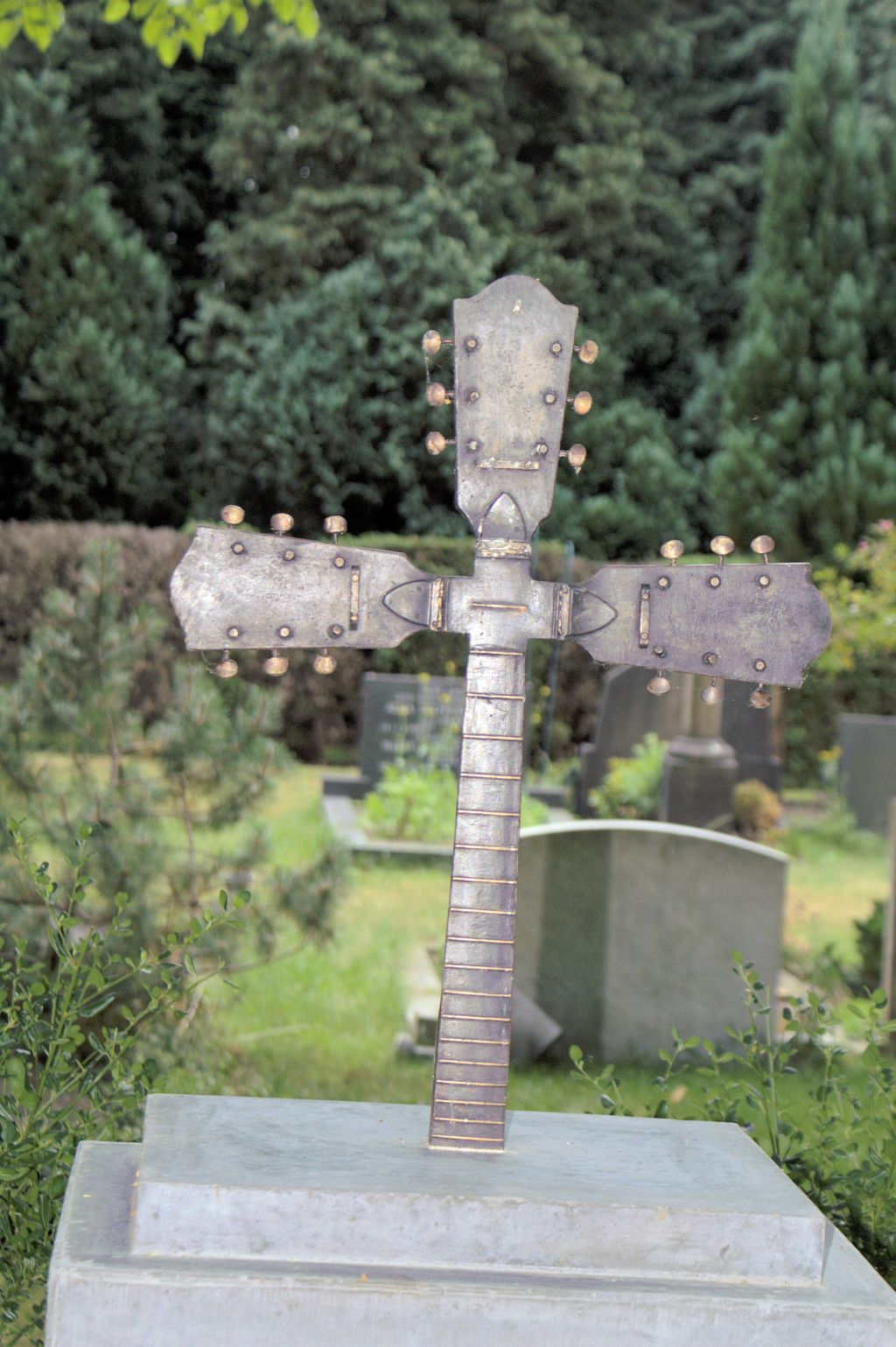
Tax's grave at the De Nieuwe Ooster cemetery in Amsterdam

The 1980s saw his personal decline, starting with the slow death by cancer of his long-time partner Laurie Langenbach, who died in 1984 — according to close friend Armand, he never recovered from her death and for the next twenty years lived surrounded by her personal belongings. Efforts to revive a music career appear hampered by personal problems caused by alcoholism and tax problems.

Tax died in 2005 in relative obscurity, bothered by financial and physical problems. He was buried in Amsterdam, after a gathering in Paradiso in his honor raised enough money for his funeral. A year later, a benefit concert was held in Paradiso to raise funds for a monument to be placed on his grave. The monument, three guitar necks crossing, continues to draw visitors.

His biography, Wally Tax – Leven en Lijden van een Outsider, was written by Rutger Vahl and came out ten years after his death in 2015.

== Discography ==
=== Solo ===
==== Albums ====
- Love In (LP, Philips, 1967)
- Wally Tax (LP, Ariola IT 87762, 1974)
- Tax Tonight (LP, Ariola XOT 89244, 1975)
- Springtime in Amsterdam (with The Music) (LP, 1989)
- The Entertainer (CD, Virgin, 2002)

==== Singles ====
Year	Title	Peak chart positions		
Year	Title	NED Top 40	NED Top 30	BEL (Fl)
1967	"I Sat And Thought And Wondered Why"	17	18	—
1967	"Let's Forget What I Said"	11	10	—
1968	"I Won't Feel Alone"	Tip	14	—
1973	"Miss Wonderful"	11	7	4
1974	"It Ain't No Use"	13	13	11
1974	"Evidently"	21	28	28
1974	"Bridges Are Burning"	26	19	—
1975	"This Girl Is Mine"	Tip	—	—
1977	"Let's Dance"	31	—	—
"—" denotes releases that did not chart

=== With The Outsiders ===
- Outsiders (LP, Relax 30007, 1967)
- Songbook (LP, Teenbeat APLP 102, 1967)
- C.Q. (LP, Phonogram Records, 236803, 1968)
- Outsiders / Wally Tax – Live 1968–2002 (CD, VPRO/3 voor 12, 002, 2006)
- The Outsiders, Photo Sound Book (Book + CD, Poparchief Nederland, 2010)

=== With Tax Free ===
- Tax Free (Polydor, 1971)

== Bibliography ==
- Tax, Wally; Ettie Huizing (1998). Wally Tax: tot hier, en dan verder. SUN. ISBN 978-90-6168-639-2.
- Blanes, Jerome (2012 – English edition). Outsiders by insiders. ISBN 978-11-059-275-08
- Vahl, Rutger (2015). Wally Tax - Leven en Lijden van een Outsider. ISBN 978-90-388-0043-1
