= Tax Free =

Dutch band (1969–1971)

- Origin: Amsterdam, Netherlands
- Genre: Psychedelic rock
- Years active: 1969−1971
- Label: Polydor
- Past members: Wally Tax; David Oliphanr; Jody Purpora; Leendert Busch

Tax Free was a Dutch band from Amsterdam. It was founded by singer Wally Tax in 1969 after disbanding of The Outsiders. The group also featured David Oliphant (guitar), Jody Purpora on vocals, guitar and keyboards and Leendert "Buzz" Busch (drums). At the beginning of 1970, the band travelled to New York, where they recorded their eponymous debut album. It was produced by Lewis Merenstein and featured violist/multi-instrumentalist John Cale, with whom Merenstein collaborated on number of projects including his debut album Vintage Violence. Bassist Richard Davis also played on this album. It was released in March 1971 and soon after broke up.

== Discography ==
- Tax Free (Polydor, 1971)

=== Tax Free (1970) ===
No.	Title	Length
1.	"Yiva"	5:23
2.	"Along The Shadowed Quay"	3:56
3.	"The Great Lie"	5:00
4.	"Day Revealed Your Face"	2:51
5.	"Ginny"	4:32
6.	"Amsterdam"	4:58
7.	"My Lady Truth"	4:19
8.	"Evening"	3:42
9.	"Back By The Quinnipiac"	6:24
