= Hans van Eijck =

Hans van Eijck (The Hague, 7 May 1946) is a Dutch musician, composer and music producer.

== Career ==
After attending conservatory, van Eijck moved to West Germany where he took part in several bands. A few years later, he returned to the Netherlands as The Jumping Pop-In's guitarist. From 1966, he became Tee-Set's pianist and briefly played in its offshoot band After Tea. When he returned to Tee-Set, he composed Ma Belle Amie, which became an international success for the band. He later composed songs such as She likes weeds, a number one hit, and Linda Linda. 3FM described him as Tee-Set's "musical genius".<

After leaving Tee-Set, he took a bachelor's degree in music at a Rotterdam conservatorium, while also working as a DJ. He later taught for several years. In the mid-1980s, he returned to the music scene, this time as a composer and/or producer. He initially used the pseudonym Eric Elston, but quickly opted to use his real name.

=== Television ===
Van Eijck became one of the juries in the Dutch talent competition Soundmixshow in the 1980s, alongside Jacques d'Ancona and others, for a period of fifteen years. Through Soundmixshow, he was involved with artists such as Georgie Davis, who achieved stardom in the show, and Helmut Lotti, to whom van Eijck wrote and produced some of his hits. He also started composing music for commercials and TV series. In the late 80s, he was appointed by Endemol as its in-house composer. After that, he composed theme tunes for RTL programmes, such as RTL Nieuws, Eigen Huis & Tuin and Koffietijd, as well as some jingles for RTL 4 and RTL 5. In 1991, he composed the theme song to Goede tijden, slechte tijden alongside Bert van der Veer.

He was also involved as composer, writer and/or producers in hit singles such as Jody Bernal's Que Si, Que No, Ron Brandsteder's Engelen bestaan niet and Henny Huisman's Met z'n allen.

=== Awards ===
In 1992, Van Eijck won the Gouden Harp for all of his work.

== Partial works ==
Van Eijck composed the themes for the following productions:

- Goede tijden, slechte tijden
- Koffietijd
- RTL Nieuws
- Soundmixshow
- Surpriseshow
- Mini-playbackshow
- Spijkerhoek
- Wie ben ik?
- Vrienden voor het leven
- Eigen Huis & Tuin
- Bureau Kruislaan
- Het Zonnetje in Huis
- Vrouwenvleugel
- Het spijt me
- Onderweg naar Morgen
- Eén tegen 100
- Tien om te zien
- Ron's Honeymoonquiz
- Liefde op het eerste gezicht
- Zonder Ernst
