= Colossus Records =

American record label

Colossus Records was an American record label founded in 1969 by Jerry Ross, who had also founded Heritage Records the year before. Like Heritage, Colossus was distributed by MGM Records.

In the autumn of 1969, Jerry Ross was in Europe looking for European hits for release in the United States, and he came across "Ma Belle Amie" by Tee-Set, whom he then signed. He was also offered Venus by Shocking Blue and "Little Green Bag" by George Baker Selection. "Venus" was released first and it reached No. 1 on Billboard Hot 100 in 1970. "Ma Belle Amie" was a Top 5 hit while "Little Green Bag" reached No. 21. Colossus also released an album in 1970 called DANKS, a male/female duet which featured Stefanianna Christopherson, then best known for her voice work on Here Comes The Grump and Scooby-Doo, Where Are You?. The Chicago horn band The Mob released their first album under the guidance of Jerry Ross in 1970.

Colossus Records closed in 1971.
