= Group 1850 =

Dutch psychedelic rock band

Groep 1850 (also known as Group 1850) was a Dutch psychedelic rock band that was founded in 1964 in The Hague. The band, despite never achieving success outside the Netherlands, are now considered one of the most innovative acid rock bands from the era.

== Career ==
They first used the name Klits, but were renamed Groep 1850 in 1966 when their debut single, "Misty Night" / "Look Around", appeared on the tiny Yep label. Though few copies were pressed, it established them as one of The Netherlands most original bands (alongside the Outsiders and Q65) and they soon signed to Philips. More singles ensued, in a highly psychedelic vein, including "Mother No-Head", their only single to chart on the Dutch Top 40. Their debut album, Agemo's Trip To Mother Earth, appeared in late 1968. In The Netherlands its sleeve had a 3D image on the cover, and came with a pair of 3D glasses. A UK release (also on Philips) did not help the band gain a footing outside the Netherlands, and Philips dropped them soon afterwards. Their next album, Paradise Now, appeared on the Dutch Discofoon label in 1969 and was only marginally less acid-influenced than its predecessor.

The band disbanded soon afterwards, but was sporadically active through the 1970s. Especially notable was another single, 1971's "Fire" / "Have You Ever Heard?", which appeared on Polydor.

In subsequent years related albums have appeared by S.I.X. (Sjardin's Invisible X-factor), Sjardin's Terrible Surprise and Orange Upstairs.

== Incomplete discography ==
=== Studio albums ===
- Agemo's Trip to Mother Earth Philips PY 844083 (1968)
- Paradise Now Discofoon Vroom & Dreesmann 7063 (1969)
- Polyandri (1974)

=== Live albums ===
- Live (1975)
- Live On Tour (1976)

=== Singles ===
- "Look Around" / "Misty Night" (Yep 1013), 1966
- "I Know (La Pensee)" / "I Want More" (Philips JF 333835), 1967
- "Mother No-Head" / "Ever Ever Green" (Philips JF 333901), 1967. No. 24 NLD
- "Zero" / "Frozen Mind" (Philips JF 333973), 1968
- "We Love Life" / "Little Fly" (Philips JF 334646), 1969
- "Don't Let It Be" / "Sun Is Coming" (Action 2102004), 1970
- "Sun Is Coming" / "We Change From Day To Day" (Intertone), 1970
- "Fire" / "Have You Ever Heard?" (Polydor 2050111), 1971
