= Little Green Bag =

- Cover of the 1969 Dutch single

Single by George Baker Selection

from the album Little Green Bag
- B-side: "Pretty Little Dreamer"
- Released: October 1969
- Recorded: 1969 at Eclipse Studios, Netherlands
- Genre: Nederbeat; pop rock; soft rock
- Length: 3:17
- Label: Negram
- Songwriters: Jan Visser; Hans Bouwens
- Producer: Luke Wiley

George Baker Selection singles chronology
"Little Green Bag" (1969)	"Dear Ann" (1970)

"Little Green Bag" is a 1969 song written by Dutch musicians Jan Visser and George Baker (born Hans Bouwens), and recorded by the George Baker Selection at the band's own expense. The track was released as the George Baker Selection's debut single by Dutch label Negram, the B-side being "Pretty Little Dreamer."

== Background ==
The track's original title was "Little Greenback", which is slang for a US dollar. However, the single was given the erroneous title "Little Green Bag", which some took to be a "bag of marijuana". The lyrics of the song add to the belief that it is about marijuana, since it describes quite similarly the confusion of trying to find the bag. The "Little Green Bag" title was then retained for all subsequently released versions of the single, as well as the group's 1970 debut album, also titled Little Green Bag.

The single peaked at No. 9 on the Dutch Top 40 singles chart and No. 3 in Belgium. In the United States, the single reached No. 16 in the middle of 1970 on the Cashbox chart and No. 21 on the US Billboard Hot 100.

In Argentina, Between 1996 and 2020, the track was used on the news television channel TN, on the program On the road, hosted by Mario Markic.

In 1992, the song was used in Quentin Tarantino's film Reservoir Dogs with song writers cited as Jan Gerbrand Visser and Benjamino Bouwens. Also that year, the song reached No. 1 in Japan after being used in a Japanese whiskey commercial.

== Charts ==
Chart (1969–70)	Peak position
Argentina (CAPIF)	2
Australia	12
Belgium (Ultratop 50 Flanders)	3
Belgium (Ultratop 50 Wallonia)	12
Brazil	24
Canada Top Singles (RPM)	16
France (IFOP)	48
Italy (Musica e dischi)	13
Netherlands (Dutch Top 40)	9
Netherlands (Single Top 100)	6
New Zealand (Listener)	15
South Africa (Springbok Radio)	7
U.S. Billboard Hot 100	21
US Top 100 (Cash Box)	16

== Certifications ==
Region	Certification	Certified units/sales
New Zealand (RMNZ)	Gold	15,000^{‡}
^{‡} Sales+streaming figures based on certification alone.

== Cover versions ==
- In 1970, The group I Punti Cardinali released a version titled "La borsetta verde".
- In 1970, Quebec singer Bobby Le Clerc recorded a French cover titled "C'est pourquoi".
- In 1970, The Italian singer Nada recorded an Italian-language version with translated lyrics by Luigi Albertelli under the title "Un passatempo".
- In 1999, Tom Jones released a cover version of the song recorded with Canadian band the Barenaked Ladies, on his album Reload.
- In 2007, The Ventures released a version on their album The Ventures – Rocky!
- In 2008, meg released a version on her album "Serpent".
- In 2012, Garou recorded a cover for his album Rhythm and Blues.
- In 2019, Cinemax / HBO Max's Warrior (Season 1, Episode 10) features a partial Cantonese cover before the closing credits. Visuals are an homage to "Reservoir Dogs" opening credits. Musical artist is uncertain.
- In 2023, The Spanish talent show Operación Triunfo covered this song with contestants Paul and Martin.
- In 2025, The Italian hardcore punk band BlockBastards covered this song for their album Another Unrequested Reunion.

== See also ==
- Mondegreen
