= Santa Lucia by Night =

Single by George Baker Selection

from the album Santa Lucia by Night
- B-side: "Santa Lucia by Night (instrumental version)"
- Released: 1985
- Length: 4:10; 3:50 (instrumental)
- Label: Teldec
- Songwriter(s): Johannes Bouwens
- Producer(s): Hans Bouwens

Music video
- "Santa Lucia by Night" on YouTube

"Santa Lucia By Night" is a 1985 song written by Dutch musician George Baker (under his real name, Johannes Bouwens) and first recorded and released by his band, George Baker Selection. The single of the group's thirteenth same name studio album—was released with instrumental version at the B-side.

It is their second biggest hit throughout Europe.

== Personnel ==
- George Baker – lead vocals, music, lyrics, producer
- Nelleke Brzoskowsky – female vocals
- George Thé – guitar and bass
- Jan Hop – drums
- John Tilly – engineered and mixed
- John Solleveld – remix

== Charts ==
Chart (1985)	Peak position
Belgium (Ultratop 50 Flanders)	12
Germany (GfK)	31
Netherlands (Dutch Top 40)	7
Netherlands (Single Top 100)	4
