= The Outsiders (Dutch band) =

Dutch rock band (1964–1969)

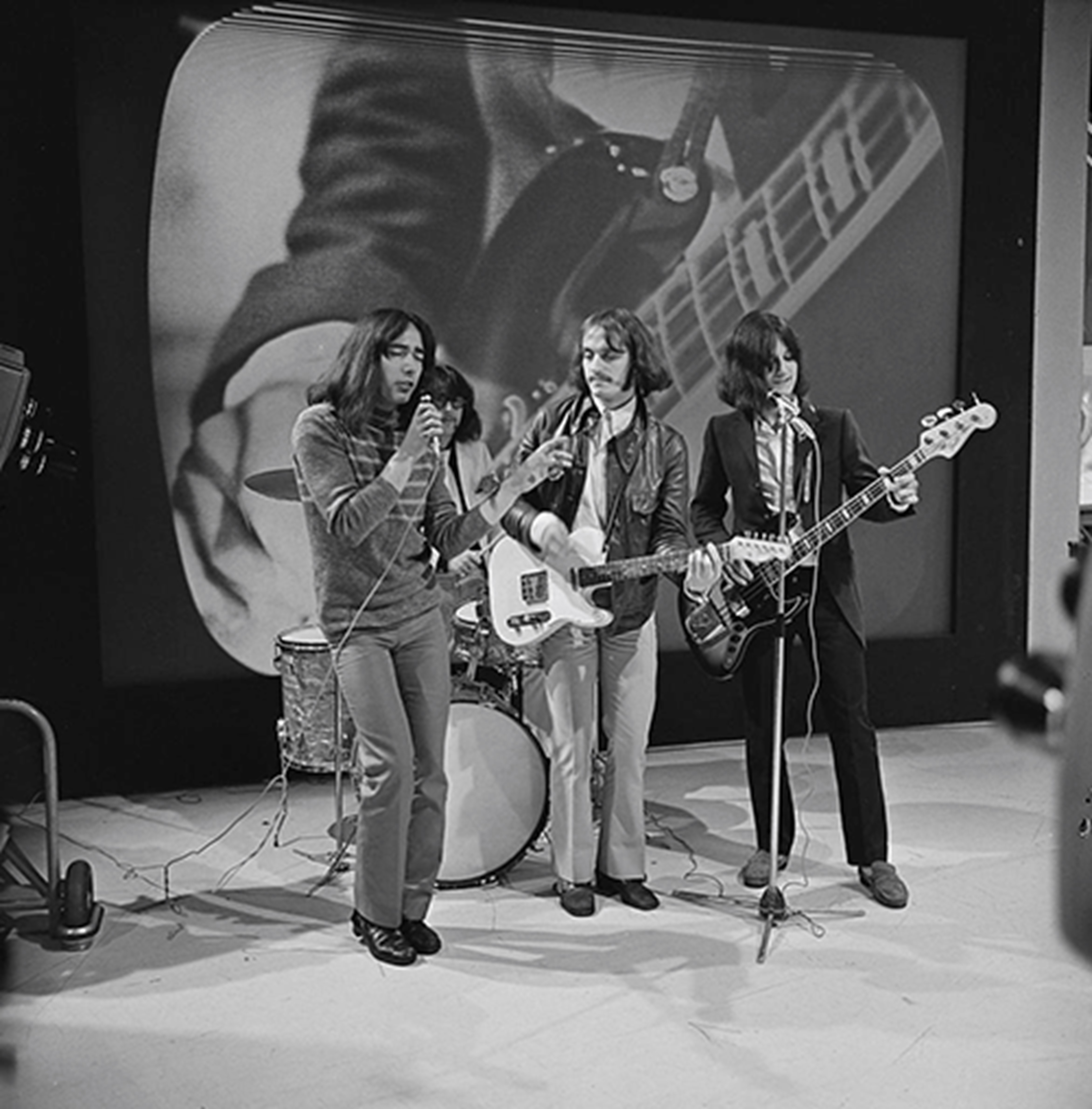
- The Outsiders (Dutch TV, 1968)

Background information
- Origin: Amsterdam, Netherlands
- Genres: Nederbeat; garage rock; psychedelic rock
- Years active: 1964–1969
- Labels: Muziek Express Op-Art, Relax, Polydor, Pseudonym
- Past members: Wally Tax; Ronnie Splinter; Appie Rammers; Tom Krabbendam; Leendert Busch; Frank Beek

The Outsiders were a Dutch Nederbeat band from Amsterdam. Their period of greatest popularity in the Netherlands was from 1965–67, but they released records until 1969. In recent years their legacy has extended beyond the Netherlands, and the group is today recognized as a distinctive exemplar of the garage rock genre.

== Career overview ==
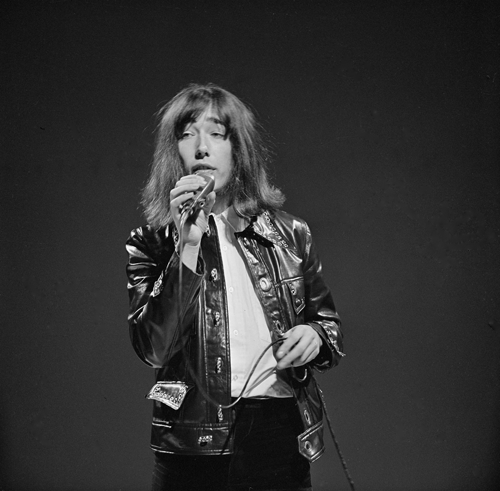
Wally Tax performing with the Outsiders in 1968

Featuring Wally Tax (vocals), Ronnie Splinter (guitar), Appie Rammers (bass guitar), Tom Krabbendam (guitar), Leendert "Buzz" Busch (drums), and Frank Beek (bass guitar 1968-1969), the band exemplified Nederbeat, a Dutch take on beat music created in the wake of the British Invasion. Unlike many European bands influenced by the Beatles, The Outsiders took their cues from harder-edged British groups like the Pretty Things (who frequently toured the Netherlands) and the Rolling Stones. The Outsiders opened for the Rolling Stones at their second Dutch concert on 26 March 1966 in 's-Hertogenbosch.

The Outsiders released three full-length albums: Outsiders and the singles collection Songbook in 1967, and C.Q. in 1968. The latter sold poorly upon release but is now considered a masterpiece of psychedelic rock and garage rock. The band also released thirteen singles, including 1967's "Summer Is Here," which reached the Dutch Top Ten. Their eponymous debut album, which featured one side of studio recordings and another of live recordings, also sold well during this period. Unusually for this era, the band never recorded any covers. While several Dutch pop groups of the era, including Tee-Set ("Ma Belle Amie"), Shocking Blue ("Venus"), and the George Baker Selection ("Little Green Bag"), all had hits in the United States on the Colossus label (resulting in what some music pundits jokingly called the "Dutch Invasion"), the Outsiders were unable to join in on this success as their records were never released in the country.

== The final year, reunions ==
After the Summer of Love, many Nederbeat bands fell from commercial favor, including the Outsiders. Later Outsiders singles had lower chart peaks, and personnel changes, friction, poor promotion and management problems followed. Experiments and changes in musical style, though critically well-regarded today, alienated the band's fanbase. The group began attempting publicity stunts in the hopes of building interest, including dressing in medieval costumes and staging a haircut for Wally Tax on Dutch television.

In the autumn of 1969, Ronnie Splinter quit music. The band disbanded, with Tax and Busch subsequently forming Tax Free.

A reunion tour of the four original Outsiders took place in October 1997. Wally Tax died in 2005.

Appie Rammers and Leen Busch were active with Tax & The Outsiders from April 2015 to early 2017, together with Tycho Tax (vocals), Yuri Tax (guitar) and Mick Langenberg (guitar).

== Legacy ==
The Outsiders are the subject of an official biography, Outsiders voor Insiders (1997), by Jerome Blanes; the English version Outsiders by Insiders was published in December 2009 by Misty Lane Books. Two collections of photographs, The Outsiders Picture Book, Volume 1 and The Outsiders Picture Book, Volume 2 and two scrapbooks with articles have also been published.

== Discography ==
=== Singles ===
- "You Mistreat Me"/"Sun's Going Down" (Muziek Express Op-Art ME 1003) 1965
- "Felt Like I Wanted to Cry"/"I Love Her Still I Always Will" (Muziek Express Op-Art ME 1006) 1966
- "Lying All the Time"/"Thinking About Today" (Relax 45004) 1966 (No. 10 NL)
- "Keep on Trying"/"That's Your Problem" (Relax 45006) 1966 (No. 9 NL)
- "Touch"/"Ballad of John B" (Relax 45016) 1966 (No. 6 NL)
- "Monkey on Your Back"/"What's Wrong With You" (Relax 45025) 1967 (No. 4 NL)
- "Summer is Here"/"Teach Me to Forget You" (Relax 45048) 1967 (No. 8 NL)
- "I've Been Loving You So Long"/"I'm Only Trying to Prove to Myself That I'm Not Like Everybody Else" (Relax 45058) 1967 (No. 29 NL)
- "Don't You Worry About Me"/"Bird in a Cage" (Relax 45068) 1967 (No. 32 NL)
- "A Cup of Hot Coffee"/"Strange Things Are Happening" (Relax 45088) 1968
- "I Don't Care"/"You Remind Me" (Polydor S 1266) 1968
- "Do You Feel Alright"/"Daddy Died on Saturday" (Polydor S 1300) 1968
- "Hits Come Back" (Imperial 5C 006 24835) 1973

=== Albums ===
- You Mistreat Me EP (Relax 11.001) 1966
- Outsiders (Relax 30.007) 1967
- C.Q. (Polydor 236 803) 1968
- The Outsiders EP (Beat Crazy BC 001) 1994

=== Compilations ===
- Songbook (Teenbeat APLP 102) 1967
- Golden Greats of The Outsiders (Bovema Negram 5N028-26197) 1979
- CQ (Complete Polydor Tapes) (Pseudonym CDP-1010-DD) 1993
