= Q65 (band) =

Dutch garage rock and psychedelic band

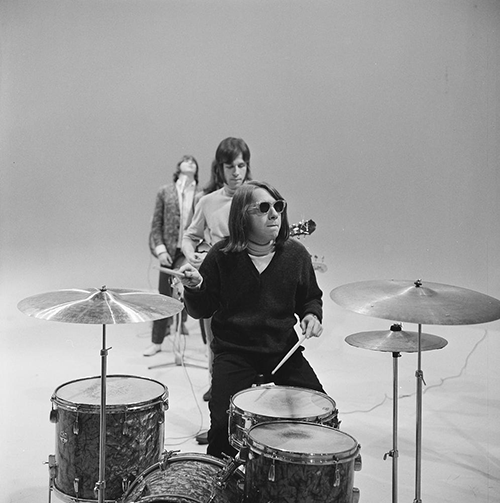
- Q65 in 1967

Background information
- Origin: The Hague, Netherlands
- Genres: Nederbeat; garage rock; psychedelic rock
- Years active: 1965–1968; 1970–2000
- Labels: Decca; Negram
- Past members: Frank Nuyens; Jay Baar; Joop Roelofs; Peter Vink; Willem Bieler; Herman Brood
- Website: q65.org

Q65 was a Dutch garage rock and psychedelic group formed in 1965, that is often considered one of the more prominent bands associated with the Nederbeat rock wave that took place in the Netherlands in the 1960s.

== Biography ==
=== 1965: Formation ===
In early 1965, guitarists Joop Roelofs and Frank Nuyens joined with singer Willem Bieler to start the band. The line-up was completed with the addition of drummer Jay Baar, formerly of Leadbelly's Limited, and bass player Peter Vink. The band was inspired by rhythm and blues traditionals and the songs of Robert Johnson and Willie Dixon, as well as new bands, such as The Kinks, The Animals and The Rolling Stones. They started performing publicly in the Spring of 1965, and later that year, would start using the name Q65. The name is a combination of the songs "Susie Q" and "Route 66", but changed to 65 as that was the year the band was formed. During a concert at skating ring De Eenhoorn, they met producer Peter Koelewijn. Very impressed by their show, he invited them to an audition at the Phonogram Studio studio, where they recorded two of their own songs: "And Your Kind" and "You're The Victor". Koelewijn released them on vinyl.

=== 1966-1968: The Golden Years ===
In January 1966, their debut single, "You're The Victor", was released and later peaked at No. 11 on the Dutch Top 40 in March 1966. Then Hans van Hemert replaced Koelewijn. Two other singles reached the Dutch charts the same year: "The Life I Live" (No. 5) and "I Despise You" (No. 19). Under Van Hemert's guidance their first album, entitled Revolution, was released later that year by Decca Records, and became a hit, selling 35,000 in the Netherlands. In 1967, they hit the charts again with the singles "From Above" (No. 13) and "World of Birds" (No. 8). Due to drug problems and military service duties of singer Wim Bieler, Q65 disbanded in 1968.

=== 1970s ===
Q65 reformed in 1970, with Beer Klaasse on drums, and signed to Negram Records, staying together for several years. Their LPs of the early 70s, Afghanistan and We Are Gonna Make It had a more psychedelic orientation. Q65's line-up changed throughout the early 1970s. Nuyens exited in 1971 to join Baar in a band called Rainman,, while Q65 continued with a new line-up, featuring John Frederikz on vocals and Joop van Nimwegen on guitar. Wim Bieler left to form a band called Dambuster. Johnny Frederiksz was brought in as lead singer, but by then the band had changed their name to Kjoe.

=== 1980s-2010s ===
The original Q65 reunited in 1980 and toured throughout that year. The group continued with various different lineups in the mid-1980s. Jay Baar died in 1990, but a version of the band, with Wim Bieler as leader, continued playing into the 1990s. Bieler died in 2000. On 2 October 2018 Joop Roelofs, who played guitar and came up with the name of the group, died aged 74.

== Discography ==
=== Albums ===
- Revolution (Decca QL625363, 1966)
- Revival (Decca XBY846515, 1969)
- Afghanistan (Negram NELP075, 1970)
- We're Gonna Make It (Negram ELS914, 1971)
- Trinity (Mohican MH001/Munich, 1997)
- Revolution (reissue) (Rotation/Universal, 2002)

=== Compilations ===
- Complete Collection 1966-1969 (PolyGram, 1998)
- The Life I Live (Rotation/PolyGram, 1998)
- Alle 13 Haags (Pink Records, 2001)
- Singles A's and B's (Hunter Music, 2002)

=== Singles ===
- "You're the Victor / And Your Kind", Decca AT10189 (1966)
- "The Life I Live / Cry in the Night", Decca AT10210 (1966)
- "The Life I Live / Ann", Philips 6817052 (1966)
- "I Despise You / Ann", Decca AT101248 (1966)
- "From Above / I Was Young", Decca AT10248 (1967)
- "World of Birds / It Came to Me", Decca AT10263 (1967)
- "World of Birds / Ain't That Lovin' You Babe", Decca AT10263 (1967)
- "So High I've Been So Down I Must Fall / Where Is the Key", Decca AT10286 (1968)
- "Ann / Sour Wine", Decca AT10336 (1968)
- "Sundance / World of Birds", Decca AT10383 (1968)
- "Don't Let Me Fall / Crumblin'", Negram NG172 (1970)
- "Don't Let Me Fall / Crumblin'", Hansa 14588 AT [German pressing]
- "Sexy Legs / There Was a Day", Negram NG196 (1970)
- "Sexy Legs / There Was a Day", Cardinal 3121
- "Sexy Legs / We Are Happy", Hansa 14804 AT [German pressing]
- "Love Is Such a Good Thing / Night", Negram NG220 (1971)
- "I Just Can't Wait / We're Gonna Make It", Negram NG230 (1971)
- "Fighting Is Easy / Country Girl", Polydor 2050181 (1971)
- "Hoonana / Troubles (Kjoe)", Polydor 2050181 (1972)
- "Lady of Love / Fighting Is Easy (Wim Bieler & Dambuster)", Polydor 2050338 (1974)
- "Mean Woman / Think It Over", CNR (1980) [unreleased]
- "Let's Roll / Are You Home", Jaws 5517 (1988)

=== EPs ===
- Kjoe Bloes (4 tracks) (Decca BU70025, 1967)
- Sexy Legs (4 tracks) (I Go Ape, 1989)
