= George Baker (Dutch singer) =

Dutch singer and songwriter (born 1944)

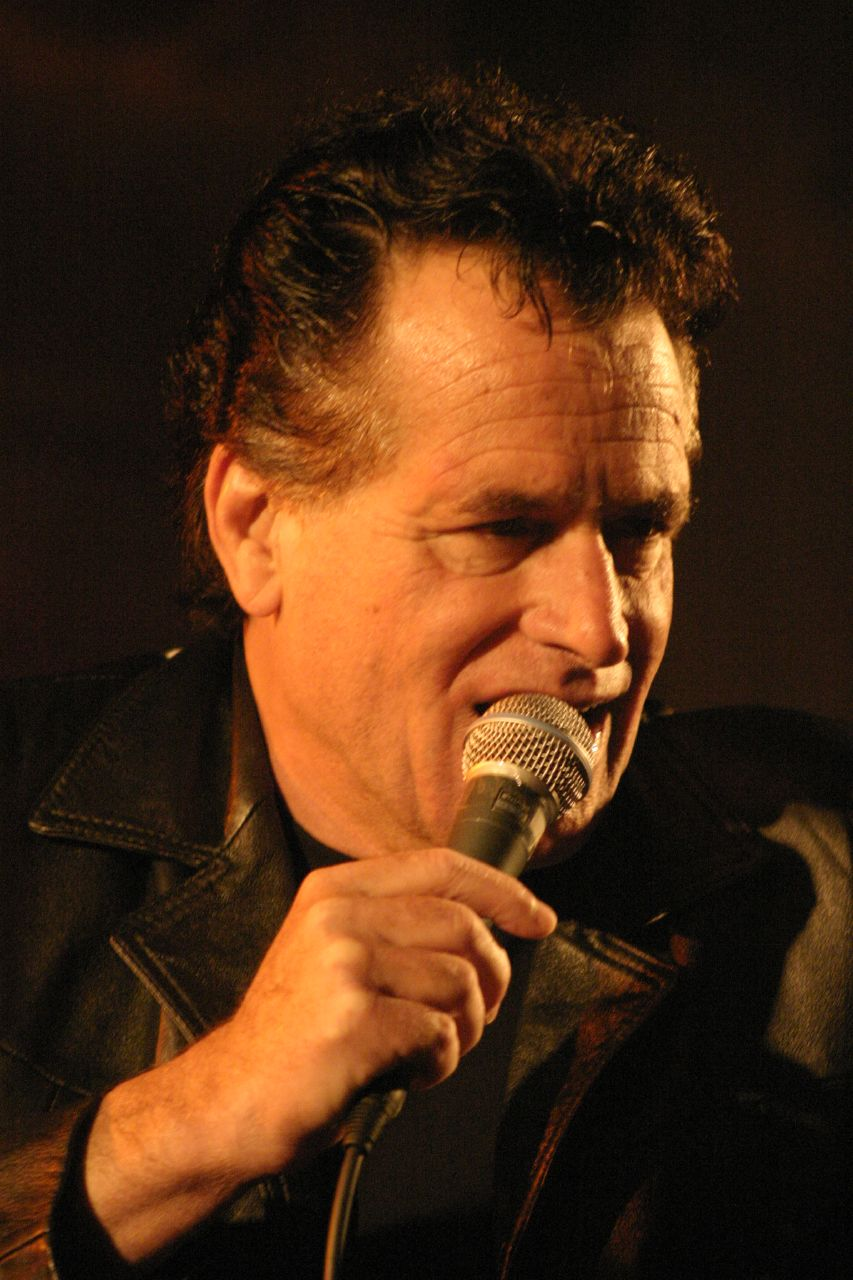
- Baker in 2006

Background information
- Born: Johannes Bouwens; 8 December 1944 (age 81)
- Origin: Hoorn, Netherlands
- Genres: Rock, pop rock, soft rock, pop
- Occupations: Singer, songwriter
- Years active: 1967–present
- Website: www.georgebaker.com

Johannes "Hans" Bouwens (born 8 December 1944), known as George Baker, is a Dutch singer and songwriter who, with his band George Baker Selection, scored three international hits: "Little Green Bag" (1969), "Paloma Blanca" (1975) and "Santa Lucia by Night" (1985).

== Childhood ==
Bouwens was born near the end of World War II on 8 December 1944 as the son of a single mother on the Gravenstraat in Hoorn, at or near the location where Jan Pieterszoon Coen was born in 1587. Months before Bouwens was born, his father, Peppino Caruso, a former Italian soldier from Calabria put to labor by the Germans in nearby Grosthuizen, had been killed while attempting to escape when he was to be transferred to Germany.

Bouwens was raised by his mother and his grandparents, Willemke Woudstra and Johannes Bouwens (1886–1952), first in Hoorn and from 1957 on the Wandelweg in Wormerveer. There, he sang and played guitar in a school band (The Jokers) with Bob Ketzer, but at the age of 14 he left school and took jobs unloading ships on the Zaan and eventually as a factory worker at a lemonade factory. In 1961, he took the stage name "Body" and formed the band Body and the Wild Cats, with Bob Ketzer and his brother Ruud as well as Gerrit Bruyn on bass, all from Wormerveer.

== George Baker Selection ==
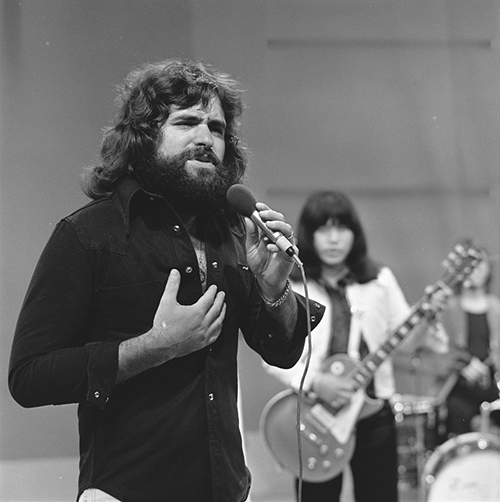
George Baker in 1974

In 1968, Bouwens joined the band Soul Invention, a soul band which was founded the previous year by Henk Kramer in Assendelft and played covers of songs by Otis Redding and Sam and Dave. The band consisted of Job Netten (guitar), Henk Kramer and Eric Bardoen (saxophone), Jacques Greuter (keyboard and flute), Theo Vermast and later Jan Visser (bass), and Ton Vredenburg (drums). Visser and Bouwens wrote the song "Little Green Bag" in the summer of 1969. (Note: The song was written in reference to the American dollar and was titled "Little Greenback" but the record company misinterpreted the words. The "new" name stuck and it was used. However, the words in the song, then and now, are "greenback," not "green bag.") The band recorded their first album in September 1969, after which, considering this was not soul music, they changed their name to The George Baker Selection, Bouwens naming himself for a character from a detective novel. This first album, Little Green Bag (1970), produced an immediate worldwide hit: their debut single, "Little Green Bag," reached No. 16 on the Cash Box magazine chart and No. 21 on the Billboard Hot 100 in the United States. The success came as a surprise for Baker, who remembers hearing it on the radio while he was working in a lemonade factory. The single sold over one million copies globally, and received a gold disc.

A string of singles and albums followed; the second single, "Dear Ann", was such a success that Baker resigned from his job in the lemonade factory and became a full-time musician. Not all band members followed suit, and besides Bouwens, the Selection from mid-1970 was formed by Jan Visser, Jan Hop (drums), Jacques Greuter and George Thé (voice, guitar, bass). In March 1971 Jan Visser left the band to be replaced by Cor Veerman. Besides scoring hits with his own Selection, he also wrote songs for others, including BZN, The Shoes, Andy Star, and Next One. In 1974, singer Lida Bond joined the Selection, and combining her voice with Baker's proved highly successful.

The Selection's fifth album, Paloma Blanca, was released in 1975, and the single "Paloma Blanca" reached No. 1 on charts in several countries. By this time Nelleke Brzoskowsky was the singer; she had joined in 1975. "Paloma Blanca" sold more than seven million copies worldwide, making it one of the most successful Dutch singles ever.

In 1978, Baker disbanded the Selection because "the pressure had become too much." The band has sold over 20 million records worldwide. However, Baker formed a new George Baker Selection in 1985, which stayed together until 1989. The second version of the Selection has released twelve albums and several compilation albums.

Baker was one of the artists who recorded the song "Shalom from Holland" (written by Simon Hammelburg and Ron Klipstein) as a token of solidarity to the Israeli people, threatened by missiles from Iraq, during the first Gulf War in 1991.

The Selection experienced a brief return to the international charts in 1992 when the song "Little Green Bag" was used in the title sequence of the film Reservoir Dogs.

In 2015, "Little Green Bag" was used in the fadeout of some episodes of series two of the Australian drama LOVE CHILD. In 2017, 2018 and 2019 Baker recorded new versions for commercials by Lidl supermarket chainstore.

== Solo career ==
After he disbanded the Selection in 1978, Baker performed as a solo artist until 1985, when he briefly returned with a new roster of the Selection. In 1989, he returned to solo work. In 2005, he released a remix of the song "Paloma Blanca" for the film Too Fat Too Furious. As a solo artist, he had released nine albums as of early September 2017. He was managed by Jaap Buijs, who died in 2015.

== Discography ==
=== Solo albums ===
Year	Album	Chart Positions
Year	Album	NLD
1978	In Your Heart	10
1978	Another Lonely Christmas Night	23
1979	Sing for the Day	18
1980	Wild Flower	13
1982	The Winds Of Time	37

=== Solo singles ===
Year	Single	Peak chart positions					Album
Year	Single	NL Top 40	NL Top 50/100	AUS	BE (Fl)	GER	Album
1978	"Rosita"	7	12	98	8	—	In Your Heart
1979	"Sing for the Day"	10	8	—	13	48	Sing for the Day
1979	"Oh Magdalena"	33	20	—	28	—	Sing for the Day
1980	"Niño Del Sol"	22	21	—	—	—	
1980	"All My Love"	13	8	—	14	—	All My Love
1981	"You Don't Love Me Anymore"	Tip	—	—	—	—	
1981	"Papillon"	Tip	47	—	—	—	
1982	"Love is the Sweetest Rose"	36	35	—	—	—	The Wind of Time
1991	"Love in Your Heart"	Tip	73	—	—	—	
2005	"Una Paloma Blanca 2005 (Vet Hard Remix)"	32	19	—	Tip	—	
"—" denotes a single that did not chart or was not released.
