= Polle Eduard =

Dutch singer

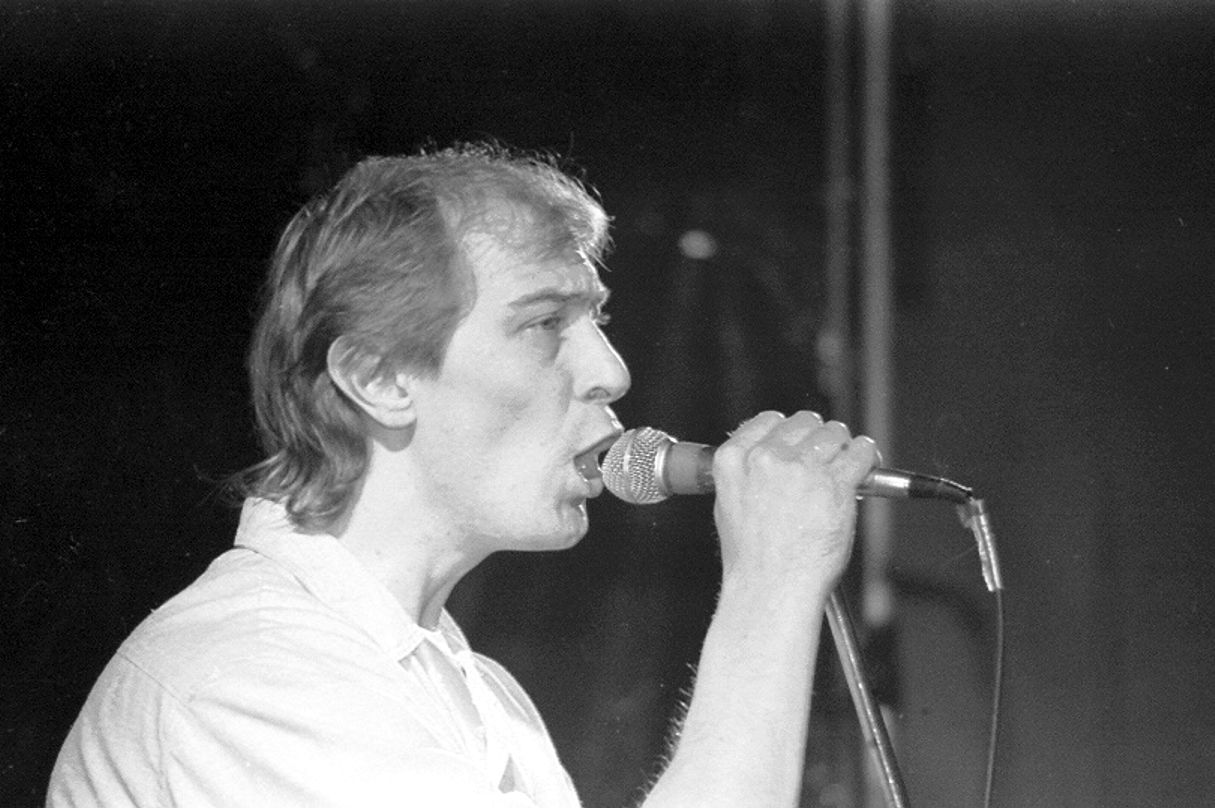
Polle Eduard in 1987.

Polle Eduard (born 2 December 1948, Delft) is a Dutch singer. Eduard is best known for the hit "Ik wil jou (jou alleen)".
