= Tee-Set =

Dutch pop rock band (1965–1988)

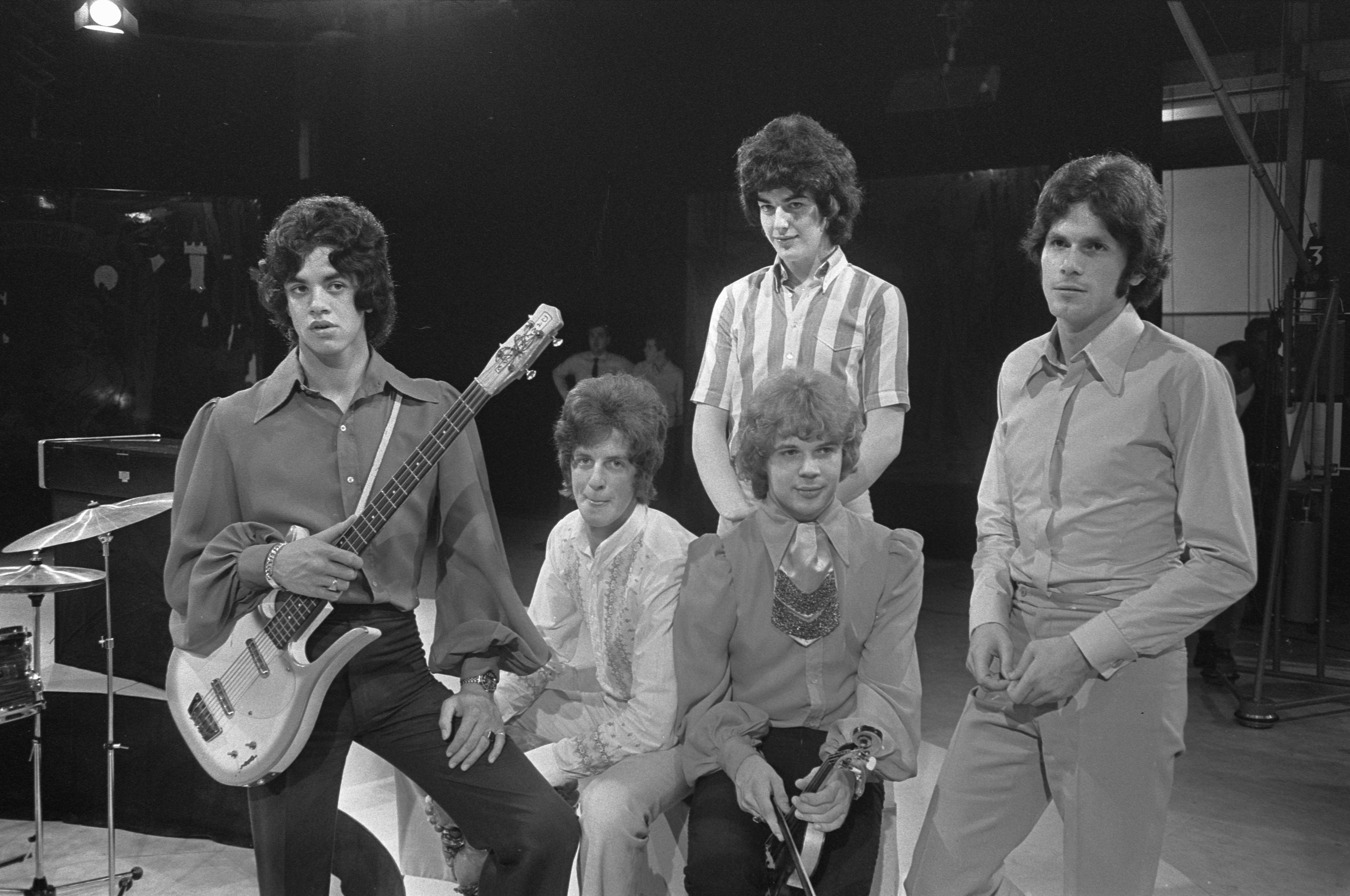
- Tee-Set in 1968

Background information
- Origin: Delft, Netherlands
- Genres: Nederbeat, Pop rock
- Years active: 1965–1988
- Label: Tee Set
- Past members: Peter Tetteroo; Dihl Bennink; Ray Fenwick; Ferry Lever; Joop Blom; Franklin Madjid; Hans van Eijck

Tee-Set were a pop rock band formed in 1965 by singer Peter Tetteroo in Delft, Netherlands. The band is best-known for their single "Ma Belle Amie", which was a No. 5 hit in the United States and No. 3 in Canada.

The band had a number of other hit songs in the Netherlands, including the number one song "She Likes Weeds". The band underwent numerous changes in its members; the only constant was its lead singer Peter Tetteroo, who died in September 2002 at the age of 55.

== History ==
The band was formed in 1965 in Delft, Netherlands by singer Peter Tetteroo. Other early members were Gerard Romeyn on guitar, Polle Eduard on bass, Carry Janssen on drums, and Robbie Plazier on keyboard. Their first single released in 1966 on the Delta label, "Early in the Morning", was successful in The Netherlands. The band had a top 10 hit "Don't You Leave" the same year, selling 10,000 copies in its first week of release. The band underwent numerous changes in its line-up though the years; the keyboardist Hans van Eijck joined in 1966, replacing Robbie Plazier. Romeyn, Eduard and Janssen left, to be replaced by Ray Fenwick on guitar, Franklin Madjid on bass, and Joop Blom on drums. Van Eijck also left and was replaced by Jan-Pieter Boekhoorn on keyboard (Van Eijck later returned in 1969). Fenwick then left and later reappeared in The Spencer Davis Group. He was replaced by Ferdi Karmelk. Dihl Bennink also joined the band. In 1969, Tetteroo founded their own label Tee Set Records.

The group recorded a single in 1969 titled "Ma Belle Amie", which was a hit in their native country, selling over 100,000 copies. The group released an album in the United States on Colossus Records in 1970 titled Ma Belle Amie (the single of the same name listing the artist as 'The Tee Set'), which reached No. 158 on the Billboard 200 chart, just as the single took off in the United States, eventually reaching No. 5. The single sold over 1 million copies, and was awarded a gold disc. The version of "Ma Belle Amie" released in 1970 on Major Minor records in the UK is a different studio version of the song, slower in tempo and beginning in a lower key than the hit U.S. version.

In the Netherlands, Tee Set's single "She Likes Weeds" reached No. 1 on the Dutch charts. However, the track was banned in the U.S. because it was said to be referring to drug use, although the title was taken from the film Funeral in Berlin. The follow-up single "If You Do Believe in Love" hit No. 81 in the US and No. 31 in Canada. The group disbanded in 1975, but briefly reunited in 1978 and 1983. Since 1983 the band was revived, although its work was mainly nostalgic "sixties".

== Members ==
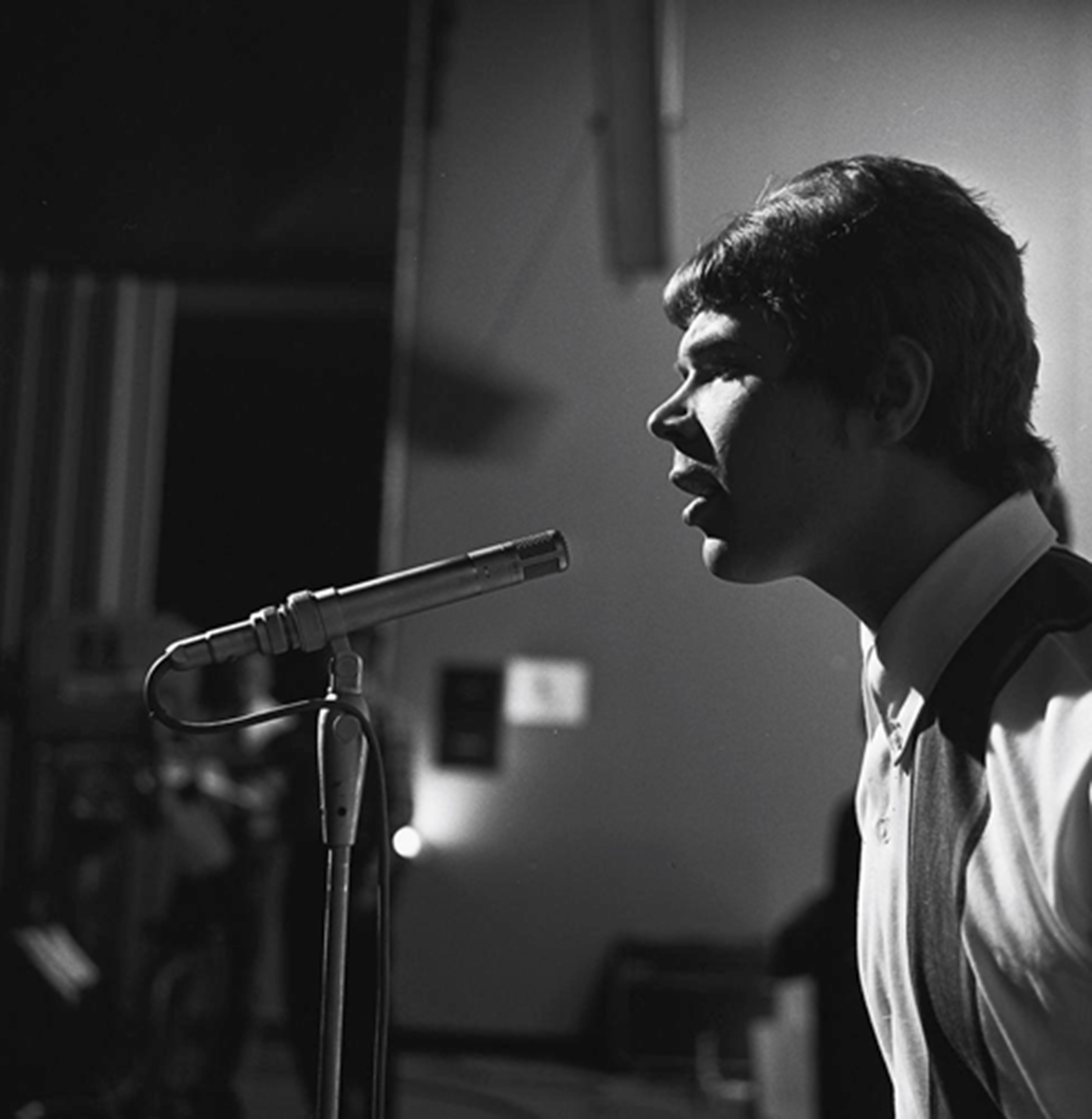
Peter Tetteroo, 1966

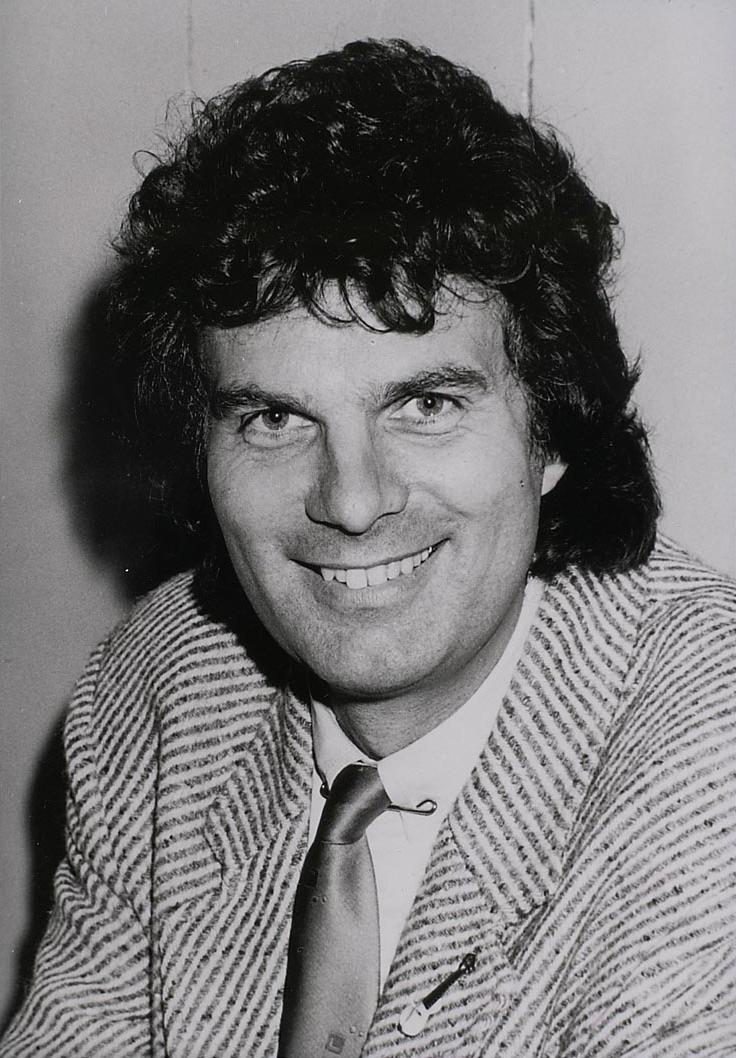
Hans van Eijck

- Peter Tetteroo (vocals) (born 8 July 1947, Delft, Netherlands; died 9 September 2002 age 55)
- Gerard Romeyn (guitar)
- Polle Eduard (bass)
- Carry Janssen (drums; died 5 February 2026, aged 77)
- Robbie Plazier (keyboards)
- Hans Van Eijck (keyboards)
- Franklin Madjid (bass guitar)
- Ray Fenwick (guitar), around 1965 to 1967
- Ferdi Karmelk (guitar)
- Dihl Bennink (guitar, flute, banjo) (born 15 February 1948, The Hague) 1967 to 1970
- Ferry Lever (guitar), from 1970 to 1979
- Joop Blom (drums)
- Jan-Pieter Boekhoorn (keyboards), from 1967 to 1969
- Herman van Boeyen (drums, 1970)
- Henry van der Bos (keyboards)
- Max Spangenberg (drums, 1970-79)
- Peter Seilberger (organ, piano)

=== Peter Tetteroo ===
Peter Tetteroo (born Petrus Gerardus Anthonius Tetteroo) (8 July 1947 − 9 September 2002) was a Dutch composer, pop musician and singer born in Delft. He became known in 1966 as founder and lead singer of Tee-Set. In 1968, he had a top 10 hit with a solo album, his version of "Red Red Wine". Despite a severe liver disease, Peter remained active to the end. He died at his home in Delft from liver cancer at the age of 55.

== Discography ==
=== Albums ===
==== Studio albums ====
Title	Album details	Peak chart positions	
Title	Album details	NL	US
Emotion	Released: December 1966; Label: Delta	8 (Note: Peaked in 2014 after being reissued the previous year)	—
Join the Tea Set	Released: 1968; Label: Tee-Set	—	—
Ma Belle Amie	Released: 1970; Label: Tee-Set, Colossus	—	158
In the Morning of My Days	Released: 1970; Label: Negram	—	—
Non-Perishable	Released: 1972; Label: Negram	—	—
"—" denotes releases that did not chart or were not released in that territory.

==== Compilations ====
Title	Album details	Peak chart positions
Title	Album details	NL
Tee Set Songbook	Released: 1967; Label: Teenbeat	—
Forever	Released: 1969; Label: Tee-Set	—
T-Five T-Set	Released: 1971; Label: Tee-Set	—
Tee Set Toppers	Released: 1973; Label: Negram	—
Do It Baby	Released: 1975; Label: Negram	—
14 Gouwe Ouwe	Released: 1976; Label: Negram	—
Golden Greats of the Tee Set	Released: 1979; Label: Bovema Negram	—
Tea's Ready	Released: 1980; Label: Picc-a-Dilly; US-only release	—
The Hits Collection	Release date: 1988; Label: EMI	—
Greatest Hits – Hot Nights	Release date: 1988; Label: Corduroy	—
Timeless (The Best Of...)	Release date: 1992; Label: Quality Entertainment	—
Golden Classics	Released: December 1993; Label: Collectables; US-only release	—
The Best of Tee-Set	Release date: 1994; Label: Red Bullet	—
24 Carat	Release date: 1997; Label: Angel Air	—
Ma Belle Amie	Release date: 2001; Label: Neon	—
She Likes Weeds – Collected	Release date: November 2011; Label: Pseudonym	12
Ma Belle Amie: The Album	Release date: 16 December 2013; Label: Pseudonym	23
Mythology	Release date: May 2014; Label: Pseudonym	40
The Golden Years of Dutch Pop Music	Release date: August 2015; Label: Universal Music	58
"—" denotes releases that did not chart or were not released in that territory.

=== Singles ===
Single	Year	Peak chart positions											Album
Single	Year	NL 40	NL 100	AUS	BE (FLA)	BE (WA)	CAN	GER	NZ	SA	SWI	US	Album
"Early in the Morning"	1966	27	—	—	—	—	—	—	—	—	—	—	Non-album singles
"Believe What I Say"	1966	31	—	—	—	—	—	—	—	—	—	—	Non-album singles
"Don't You Leave"	1966	9	8	—	—	—	—	—	—	—	—	—	Emotion
"Please Call Me"	1967	22	—	—	—	—	—	—	—	—	—	—	Non-album singles
"Now's the Time"	1967	13	13	—	—	—	—	—	—	—	—	—	Non-album singles
"What Can I Do"	1967	31	—	—	—	—	—	—	—	—	—	—	Non-album singles
"Tea Is Famous (In the Whole Wide World)"	1968	12	11	—	—	—	—	—	—	—	—	—	Join the Tea Set
"Life's but Nothing"	1968	—	—	—	—	—	—	—	—	—	—	—	Join the Tea Set
"Trip Trap Door de Tulpjes" (Peter Tetteroo as Tinus Plotseling)	1968	—	—	—	—	—	—	—	—	—	—	—	Non-album singles
"This Rose in My Hand"	1968	16	17	—	—	—	—	—	—	—	—	—	Non-album singles
"Mr. Music Man"	1969	39	—	—	—	—	—	—	—	—	—	—	Ma Belle Amie
"Ma Belle Amie"	1969	6	6	3	4	3	3	8	5	1	2	5	Ma Belle Amie
"Finally in Love Again"	1970	26	22	—	—	—	—	—	—	—	—	—	Ma Belle Amie
"If You Do Believe in Love"	1970	22	17	42	—	—	31	—	—	—	—	81	Ma Belle Amie
"She Likes Weeds"	1970	1	1	—	3	18	—	—	—	—	—	—	In the Morning of My Days
"Marie Claire" (Belgium-only release)	1971	—	—	—	—	—	—	—	—	—	—	—	In the Morning of My Days
"In Your Eyes (I Can See the Lies)"	1971	9	7	—	21	—	—	—	—	—	—	—	Non-album singles
"Little Lady"	1971	19	19	—	29	—	—	—	—	—	—	—	Non-album singles
"A Sunny Day in Greece"	1971	20	18	—	19	—	—	—	—	—	—	—	Non-album singles
"Shotguns"	1972	16	17	—	30	—	—	—	—	—	—	—	Non-album singles
"Mary Mary (Take Me 'Cross the Water)"	1972	20	17	—	27	—	—	—	—	—	—	—	Non-Perishable
"Long Ago"	1972	—	—	—	—	—	—	—	—	—	—	—	Non-album single
"There Goes Johnny (With My Lady)"	1972	—	—	—	—	—	—	—	—	—	—	—	Non-Perishable
"You Bringing Me Down"	1973	—	—	—	—	—	—	—	—	—	—	—	Non-album single
"The Bandstand"	1974	16	25	—	—	—	—	—	—	—	—	—	Do It Baby
"Do It Baby"	1975	13	22	—	21	—	—	—	—	—	—	—	Do It Baby
"Baby Let Your Hair Grow Long"	1976	—	—	—	—	—	—	—	—	—	—	—	Non-album singles
"I'll Be Lost Without Your Lovin'"	1977	—	—	—	—	—	—	—	—	—	—	—	Non-album singles
"Linda-Linda"	1979	20	19	—	17	—	—	—	—	—	—	—	Non-album singles
"TV Boy"	1980	—	—	—	—	—	—	—	—	—	—	—	Non-album singles
"Tribute to the Spencer Davis Group" (as T.E.E. Set)	1983	—	—	—	—	—	—	—	—	—	—	—	Non-album singles
"Rollerskater" (as T.E.E. Set)	1983	—	—	—	—	—	—	—	—	—	—	—	Non-album singles
"Hot Nights"	1988	—	—	—	—	—	—	—	—	—	—	—	Greatest Hits – Hot Nights
"—" denotes releases that did not chart or were not released in that territory.
