= Nederbeat =

Dutch rock music boom of the mid-1960s

- Stylistic origins: Beat music; Nederpop; garage rock
- Cultural origins: Mid-1960s, Netherlands
- Typical instruments: Electric guitar; bass guitar; acoustic guitar; drums; piano; keyboards

Other topics
- Dutch pop and rock

Nederbeat (also: Nederbiet) is a genre of rock music that began with the Dutch rock boom in the mid-1960s influenced by British beat groups and rock bands such as the Beatles and the Rolling Stones. Among the best-known Nederbeat groups are the Golden Earrings (which became Golden Earring), the Motions, the Outsiders and Shocking Blue.

== History ==
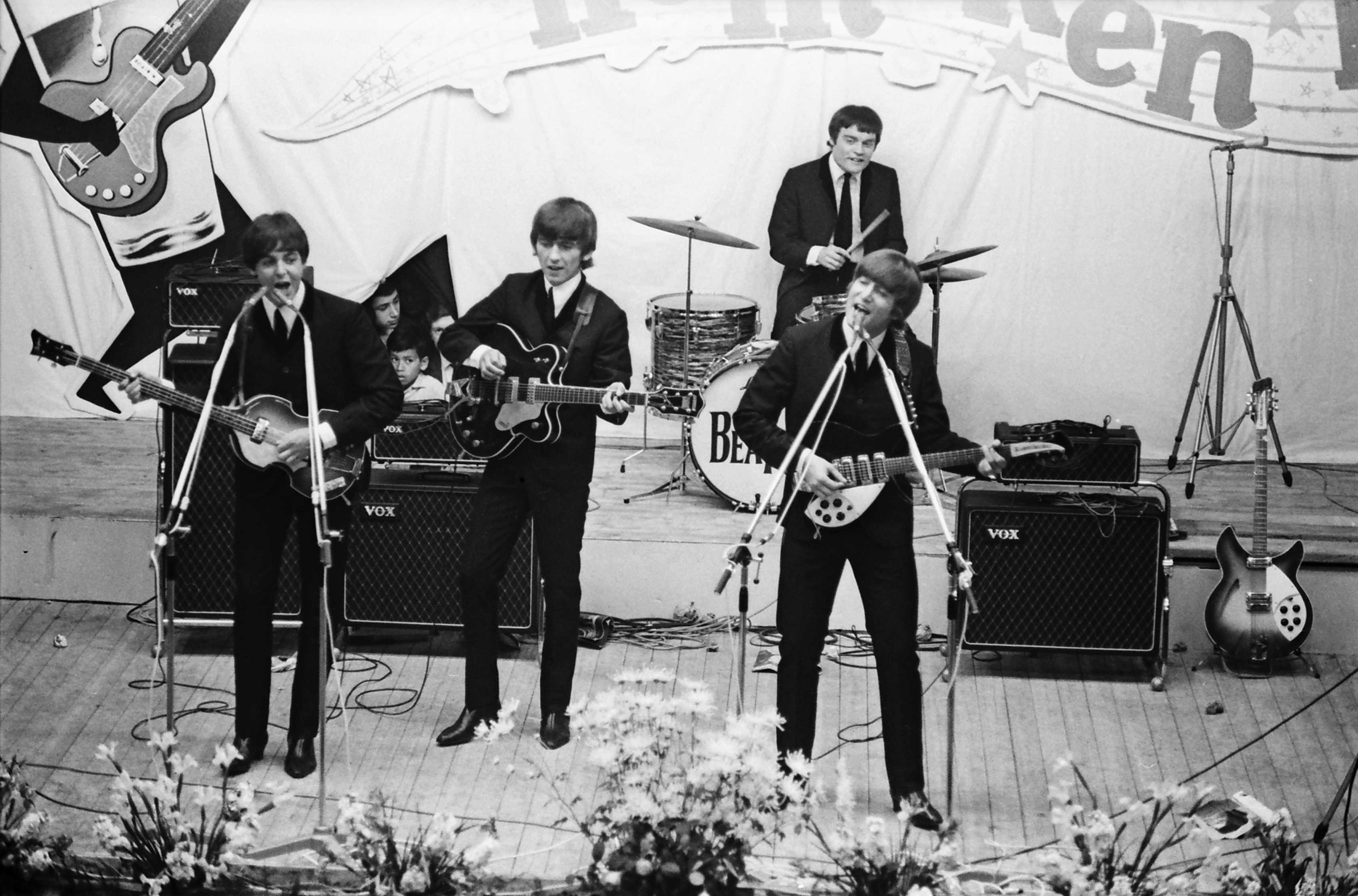
The Beatles performing in Blokker, Netherlands, in 1964. At the time of this gig Jimmie Nicol was substituting for Ringo Starr, who was ill.

In the 1960s, the Beatles and the Merseybeat sound began to dominate the Dutch charts. The popularity of such music led to interest among Dutch musicians in forming bands to play this type of rock music, replacing a previous genre, Indorock, performed by Indonesian immigrants in the Netherlands. The interest was further spurred on by the Beatles concerts in the Netherlands in 1964 that drew large crowds, followed by a performance by the Rolling Stones at the Kurhaus in Scheveningen disrupted by an excited audience. The emergence of the popular pirate station Radio Veronica and its creation of the first Top 40 chart in the Netherlands in 1965 also helped spread interest in this music culture.

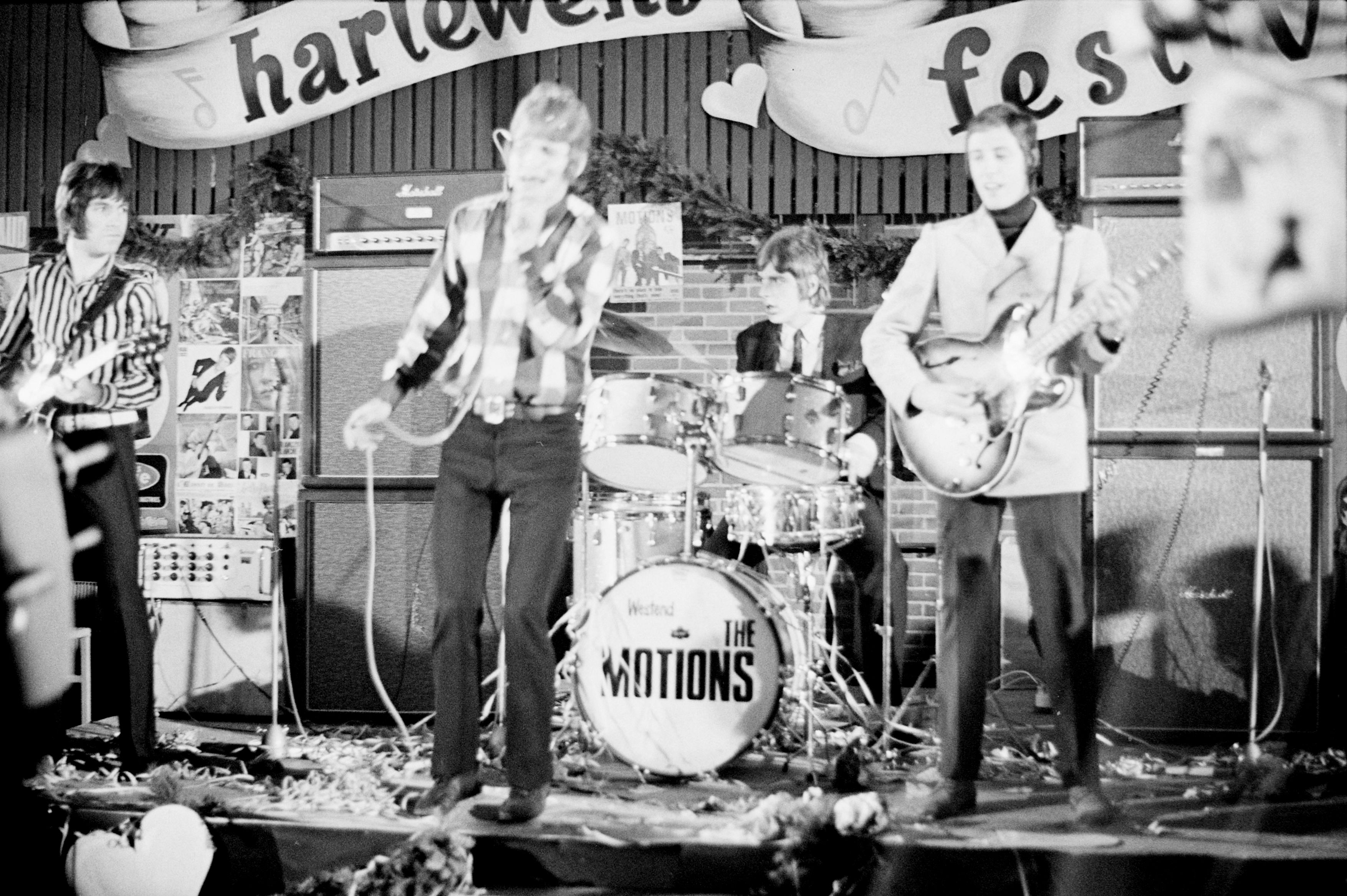
The Motions in 1966

The Hague was the country's beat capital, where bands such as the Golden Earrings (the predecessors of Golden Earring), InCrowd, Q65, Het, Sandy Coast and The Motions were formed, along with its neighbouring coastal town, Scheveningen. The clubs on its boulevard, from where Veronica's pirate ship was constantly visible, became the locus for Dutch talent. Other bands such as the Outsiders also emerged in Amsterdam. These bands generally performed in English, with the exception of a few such as Het who performed in Dutch.

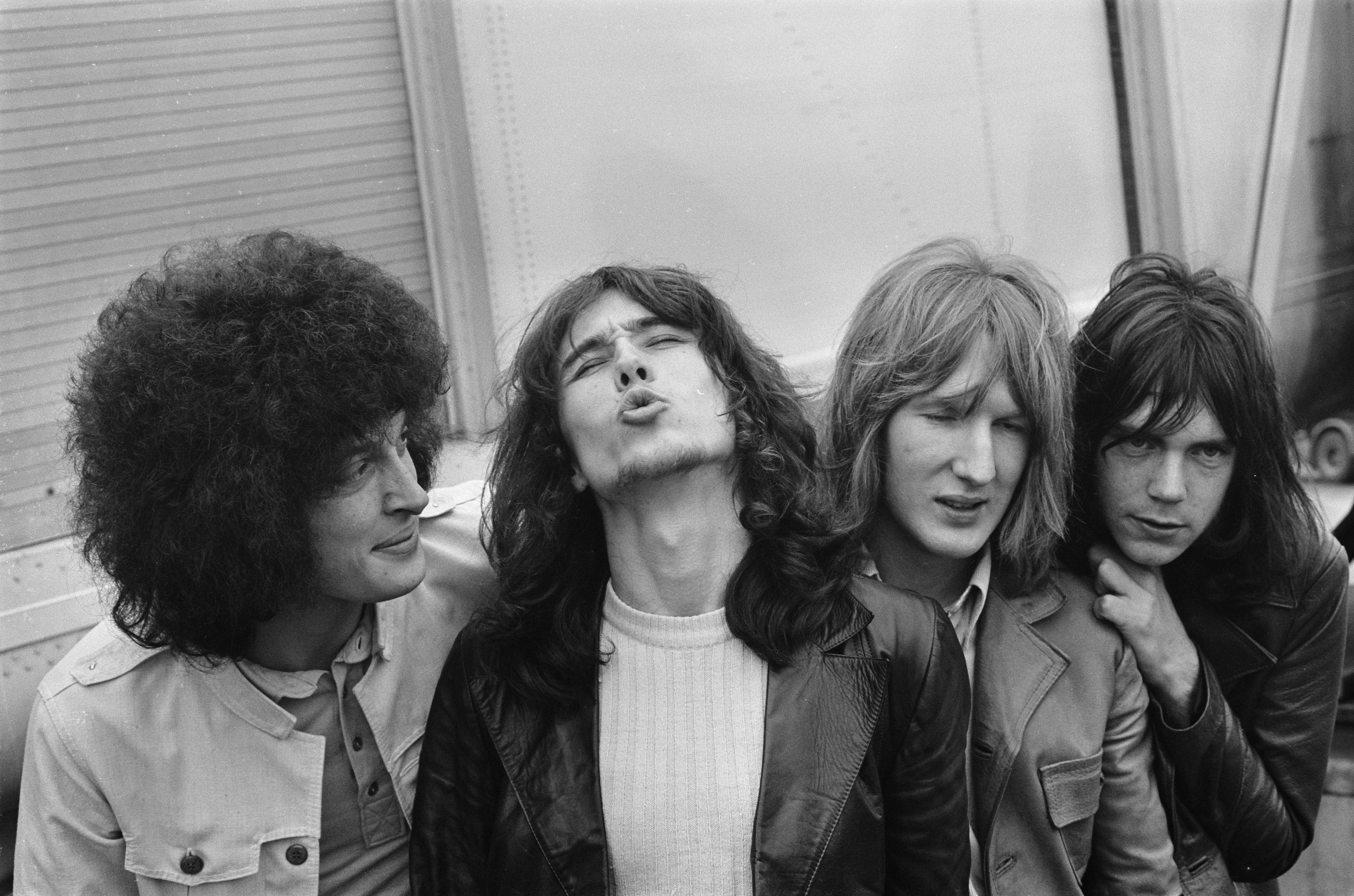
Golden Earring in 1969

The Motions were the first Nederbeat band to produce charting singles in the Netherlands, with their songs "It's Gone", released in late 1964, and "Wasted Words" in 1965. Their guitarist Robbie van Leeuwen would later form Shocking Blue. Other popular groups were the Outsiders, Q65, Golden Earring, Ro-d-ys, the Shoes, and Cuby & the Blizzards.

Nederbeat had association with the psychedelia and counterculture of the 1960s in the Netherlands. The beat sound was popular for a few years before the sound started to change, and the musical style of the bands evolved. Soul and rhythm and blues became more popular; groups that performed in such style include Rob Hoeke Rhythm & Blues Group. The Cats shifted into the palingsound they created, while Cuby & the Blizzards developed their own distinct style of blues.

The bands were mostly popular only in the Netherlands, but a few bands found international success. In 1970, Tee-Set had a top 10 hit with "Ma Belle Amie" in many countries, while Shocking Blue did better with "Venus", which became the first ever No. 1 single by a Dutch band on Billboard Hot 100. Later, in 1973, Golden Earring also had a worldwide hit with "Radar Love". However, despite the successes, the genre had faded in the 1970s as popular music moved on to other genres and tastes such as disco.

== List of Nederbeat bands ==
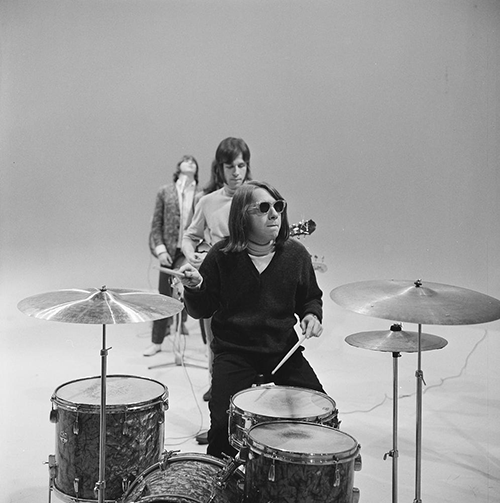
Q65 in 1967

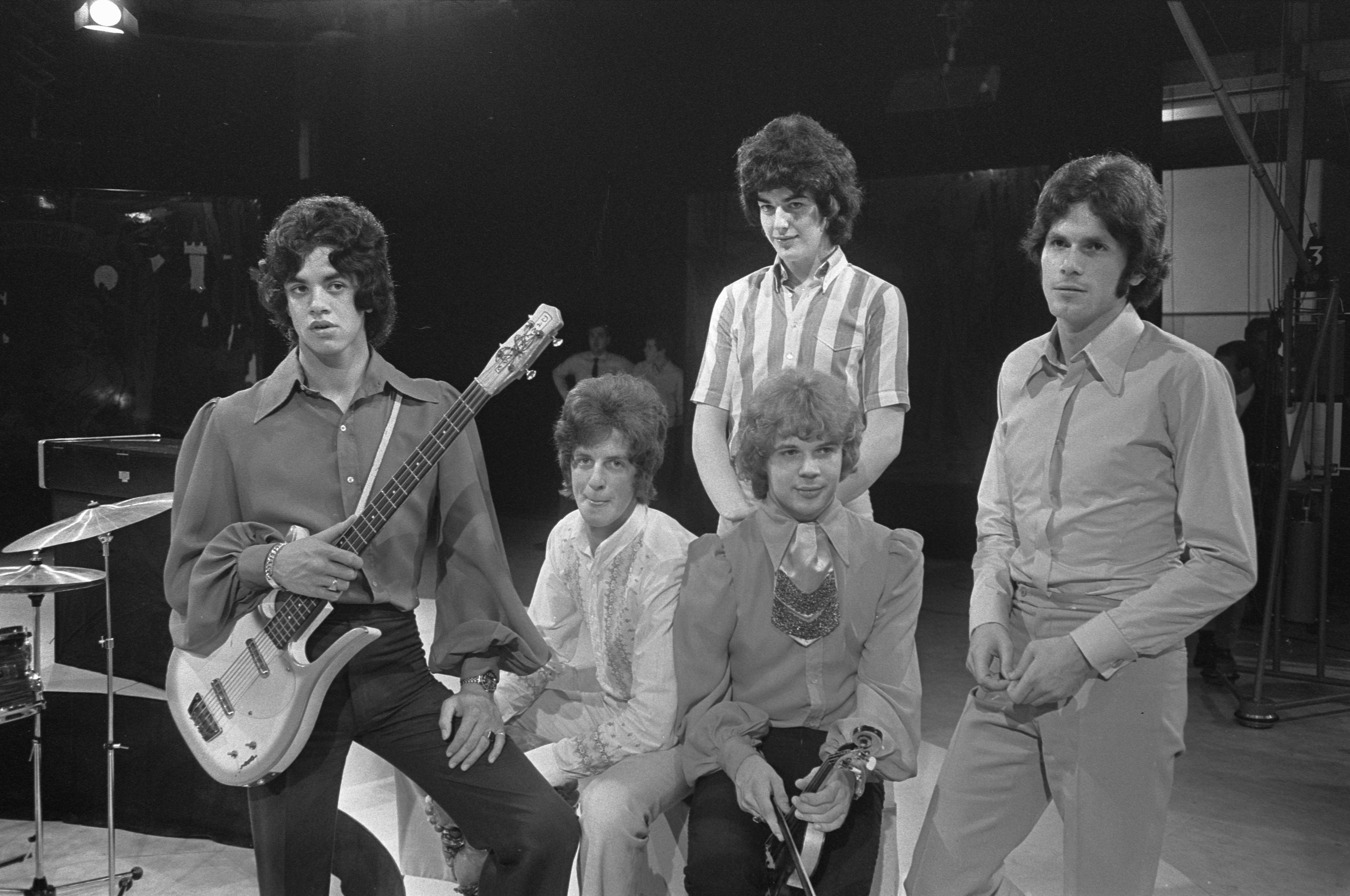
Tee-Set in 1968

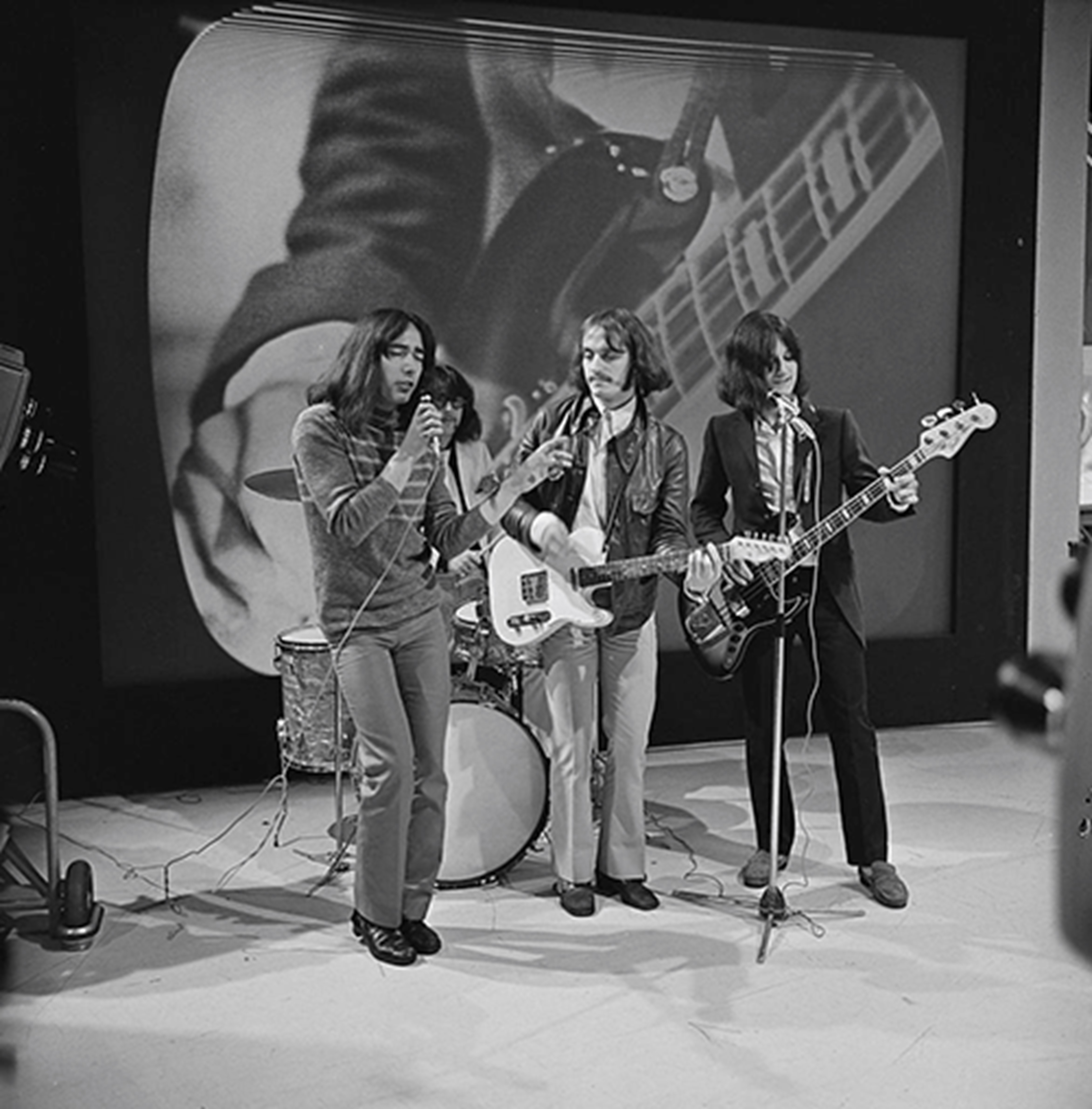
The Outsiders in 1968

The following is an incomplete list of Nederbeat bands and some of their songs:

- Les Baroques – "Such A Cad", "I Know"
- The Buffoons
- The Bumble Bees
- The Cats – "What A Crazy Life", "Sure He's A Cat"
- Cuby & the Blizzards – "Window of My Eyes"
- Eddysons – "Ups and Downs"
- Golden Earring – "Radar Love"
- Group 1850
- Het (Dutch band) – "Ik Heb Geen Zin Om Op Te Staan"
- Jay-Jays – "Baldheaded Woman (No Sugar In My Coffee)"
- Johnny Kendall & the Heralds – "St. James Infirmary", "Jezebel"
- The Motions – "Wasted Words", "Why Don't You Take It"
- The Outsiders – "Touch", "Monkey On Your Back"
- The Phantoms (Dutch band) – "I'll Go Crazy", "Tormented"
- Q65 – "The Life I Live", "You're The Victor"
- Ro-d-Ys – "Take Her Home", "Just Fancy"
- Sandy Coast – "A Girl Like You", "I See Your Face Again"
- The Shoes – "Na, Na, Na", "Standing And Staring"
- Shocking Blue – "Venus", "Never Marry A Railroad Man"
- Tee-Set – "Don't You Leave", "Early In The Morning"
- Zen – "Hair"
- ZZ & de Maskers –

== See also ==
- List of garage rock bands
- Nederpop
