= Sandy Coast =

Dutch rock band

Sandy Coast was a Dutch rock band fronted by Hans Vermeulen (1947–2017) who were successful in the late 1960s and early 1970s. The band's biggest hits include "Just a Friend" and "True Love (That's a Wonder)" in The Netherlands.

== Biography ==
=== 1961-1974; success years ===
Vermeulen formed the band in 1961 as Sandy Coast Skiffle Group; his bass-playing brother Jan Vermeulen (1945-1999) joined and on his insistence they became Sandy Coast Rockers. The name was eventually abbreviated to Sandy Coast. They performed at community-centers and talent-contests; in 1965 they won a record-contract at Negram and released their debut-single "Being in love". Their fourth single, a 1966 cover-version of Vera Lynn's "We'll Meet Again" (completely based on vocals and harmonies and instruments arrangement on The Byrds version from 1965) gave them their first taste of chart-success. "I see your face again" from their debut-album And their name is... broke the top 20 in the spring of 1968, and Sandy Coast soon traded beat for psychedelic rock. "Capital punishment", recorded when Vermeulen suffered a cold, became another top 20-hit early 1969. The same year Sandy Coast signed to Page One; they recorded three singles plus their third album Shipwreck which failed to be as successful as its predecessor From the workshop. The label folded after a row between Larry Page and Dick James; the contract was still valid, and Sandy Coast were unable to put out new material for two years. In 1971 they signed to Polydor and released "True Love (That's a Wonder)" and "Just a Friend". During this period the band were a five-piece completed by pianist Ron Westerbeek, longtime drummer Onno Bevoort and former Livin' Blues bass-player Henk Smitskamp (Jan Vermeulen temporarily switched to rhythm-guitar); the latter soon departed to join Shocking Blue.

Chart-success continued with "Just two little creatures" and "Summertrain" in 1972, and "Blackboard jungle lady" in 1973 album. It was to be their final hit for the next couple of years as Sandy Coast disbanded in 1974.

=== 1975-1979; solo projects ===
Bevoort and Westerbeek formed the band Water; Vermeulen and his brother continued in Rainbow Train for the remainder of the decade. He collaborated with bandmemberAnita Meyer on her 1976 debut solo-single "The Alternative Way" which became a number one hit on the Dutch Top 40 chart. Vermeulen continued writing and producing for other artists.

=== 1980-1990; reunions ===
Sandy Coast reformed on 13 June 1980 for the Haagse Beatnach, a sixties-revival-show featuring bands from The Hague and surrounding places. They performed a new song, "The eyes of Jenny", which put them back in the charts in 1981. An album, Terreno, followed which included a reggae-flavoured version of "Capital Punishment".

Other hits were also rerecorded for 1988's Rendez-vous; the band occasionally performed at golden oldie shows minus Bevoort.

=== 1994-present; twilight years of Hans Vermeulen and tributes ===
Vermeulen's triumphs as a producer and songwriter continued till the early 1990s. He moved to Thailand to make a fresh start on the back of "The eyes of Jenny"; he suddenly died in November 2017.

February 2018 saw the release of Subject of my thoughts, a cd-box containing all albums by Sandy Coast and Rainbow Train plus non-album-tracks and Vermeulen's solo-efforts.

== Discography ==
=== Albums ===
- And Their Name Is... Sandy Coast (1967)
- From The Workshop (1968)
- Shipwreck (1969)
- Sandy Coast (1971)
- Stone Wall (1973)
- Terreno (1980)

=== Singles ===
Year	Single	Chart Positions				Album
Year	Single	NL Top 40	NL Top 100	BE (Fl)	BE (W)	Album
1965	"Being in Love"	—	—	—	—	
1966	"Subject Of My Thoughts"	—	—	—	—	And Their Name Is...
1966	"That Girl Was Mine"	—	—	—	—	And Their Name Is...
1966	"We'll Meet Again"	39	—	—	—	And Their Name Is...
1966	"Sorry She's Mine"	40	—	—	—	And Their Name Is...
1967	"A Girl Like You"	28	—	—	—	And Their Name Is...
1967	"And Her Name Is..."	22	—	—	—	
1968	"I See Your Face Again"	12	—	—	—	
1968	"Innocent Girl"	Tip	—	—	—	From The Workshop
1969	"Capital Punishment"	12	11	—	—	From The Workshop
1969	"Advice"	—	—	—	—	Shipwreck
1969	"Deep Down Down"	Tip	—	—	—	
1970	"Eleanor Rigby"	—	—	—	—	
1970	"Pretty Clothes"	—	—	—	—	
1971	"True Love That's A Wonder"	3	2	11	—	Sandy Coast
1971	"Just A Friend"	11	9	19	43	Sandy Coast
1972	"Summertrain"	6	7	20	—	
1972	"Just Two Little Creatures"	26	—	—	—	
1973	"Blackboard Jungle Lady"	31	24	—	—	Stone Wall
1980	"The Eyes Of Jenny"	11	15	24	—	Terreno
1980	"Rainy Days"	—	—	—	—	Terreno
1981	"Hollywood"	Tip	49	—	—	Terreno

- Tip – Tipparade (Bubbling under chart)
