= Ma Belle Amie =

Single by Tee-Set

from the album Ma Belle Amie
- B-side: "Angels Coming In The Holy Night"
- Released: July 1969 (Netherlands); December 1969 (International)
- Recorded: 1969
- Genre: Pop
- Length: 3:16
- Label: Colossus
- Songwriter: Peter Tetteroo / Hans Van Eijck

Music video
- "Ma Belle Amie" on YouTube

"Ma Belle Amie" is a song by Tee-Set, released as a single from the album Ma Belle Amie. It reached No. 5 on the US Billboard Hot 100 and No. 3 in Australia and Canada in 1970, No. 1 in South Africa, and reached the Top 10 across central Europe.

The original song, whose French title means "My Beautiful Friend", features a French lyric line: "Apres Tous les beaux jours je te dit merci merci" ("After all the beautiful days, I say thank you, thank you"). The song is dominated by electric organ, and has drums, bass and acoustic guitar, with handclaps in the bridge section.

== Release and reception ==
The song was written by Peter Tetteroo and Hans Van Eijck of Tee-Set. The single was first released in 1969 in the Netherlands on Tee Set Records (TS 1329) and sold over 100,000 copies. Jerry Ross, who was in Europe in the autumn of 1969 looking for European hits for release in the United States, happened to hear the song while in a club in Switzerland and he then signed Tee-Set. The song was released in the United States after the successful release of "Venus" by Shocking Blue, another Dutch band Ross signed. "Ma Belle Amie" reached No. 5 on the chart date of March 14, 1970 in the US.

At least three studio recorded versions of the song were made: the US hit on Colossus Records (CS107); a British issue on Major Minor Records (MM666), released in 1970; and a Black and White video featuring the band miming along a waterfront. This video version appears the same as the hit US rendering, but for minor differences to the repeated chorus ending. The British release is completely different, slower in tempo and starting in a lower key. The group also recorded an Italian-language version.

== Charts ==
=== Weekly charts ===
Chart (1969–70)	Peak position
Australia (Kent Music Report)	3
Belgium (Flanders)	4
Belgium (Wallonia)	3
Canada RPM Top Singles	3
Netherlands (Single Top 100)	6
Netherlands (Dutch Top 40)	6
New Zealand (Listener)	5
South Africa (Springbok)	1
Switzerland (Schweizer Hitparade)	2
U.S. Billboard Hot 100	5
U.S. Cash Box Top 100	6
West Germany (GfK)	8

Dennis Jones cover

Chart (2005)	Peak position
Netherlands (Dutch Top 40)	36

=== Year-end charts ===
Chart (1970)	Rank
Australia (KMR)	31
Canada	51
South Africa	8
Switzerland	5
U.S. Billboard Hot 100	81
U.S. Cash Box	59
