= The Shoes (Dutch band) =

Dutch Nederbeat band

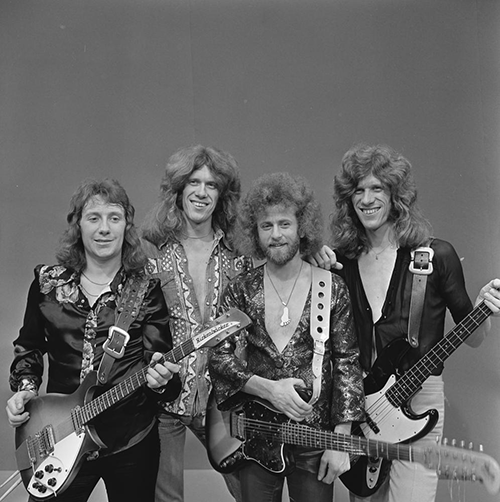
- The Shoes in 1974

Background information
- Origin: Zoeterwoude, Netherlands
- Genre: Nederbeat
- Years active: 1963–present
- Labels: Polydor, Negram, CNR, Hunter Music
- Members: Theo van Es; Wim van Huis; Jan Versteegen; Henk Versteegen

The Shoes are a Dutch Nederbeat band from Zoeterwoude that had a string of hits from 1966. The group was founded in 1963 as The White Shoes. They still perform.

== Band members ==
- Theo van Es : vocals
- Wim van Huis : guitar
- Jan Versteegen : bass
- Henk Versteegen : drums

== Discography ==
=== Albums ===
Year	Title	Format	Label	Other
1968	Wie The Shoes Past...	12"LP	Polydor	236 168
1969	Greatest Shoes' Hits	12"LP	Polydor	236 813
1970	Let The Shoes Shine In	12"LP	Polydor	2441 013
1973	The Best	12"LP	Polydor	2495 046
1974	Make Up Your Make-Up	12"LP	Negram	NR 103
1980	Greatest Hits	12"LP	Polydor	2426 026
1982	Live '81	12"LP	CNR	660 102
1990	Greatest Hits (Nederpop)	CD	Polydor	843 208 2
1995	Do It	CD	Multidisk	551 048 2
1998	Na Na Na	CD	Rotation	557 779 2
2002	Singles A's & B's	2 CD's	Hunter Music	HM 1389 2
2004	Wie The Shoes Past + Let The Shoes Shine In	CD	Hunter Music	HMR 1585 2

=== Singles ===
Year	Title	Format	Label	Other
1963	The Shuck / Warum Weinst Du	7"single	Monty Records	14 447 (als White Shoes)
1963	Bye Bye Baby / I Will Be Home Again	7"single	Monty Records	14 449 (als White Shoes)
1966	Standing And Staring / Ask My Mother	7"single	Polydor	S 1210
1967	Na NA Na / Listen To The Lyrics Of This Song	7"single	Polydor	S 1219
1967	Peace And Privacy / Once Again	7"single	Polydor	S 1237
1967	Farewell In The Rain / What In The World Is Love	7"single	Polydor	S 1249
1968	Farewell In The Rain / Na Na Na	7"single	Vogue	DV 14 718 (Duitsland)
1968	No Money For Roses / Imagination	7"single	Polydor	S 1257
1968	Farewell In The Rain / No Money For Roses	7"single	Durium Marche Estere	DE 2694 (Italië)
1968	Man's Life / I Don't Want To Go	7"single	Polydor	S 1265
1968	Don't You Cry For A Girl / Shooting Star	7"single	Polydor	S 1282
1968	Tank Esso Mix / He Spoiled The Days	7"single	Esso	LP 1
1969	Emptyness / End Of The Line	7"single	Polydor	S 1301
1969	That Tender Looking Angel / Trip Around The World	7"single	Polydor	S 1310
1969	Happiness Is In This Beat / My Girl Flo	7"single	Polydor	S 1318
1969	Daylight / Time Is What I Need	7"single	Polydor	S 1331
1969	End Of The Line / Happiness Is In This Beat	7"single	Polydor	59354 (Duitsland)
1970	Osaka / Flutes, Horns, Strings And Drums	7"single	Polydor	2050 014
1970	Adios Corazon / I'm On My Way	7"single	Polydor	2050 035
1970	After All / Highways And Byways	7"single	Polydor	2050 062
1971	Bless The Day / Be What You Are	7"single	Polydor	2050 085
1971	Join The Celebration / Little Miss Lonely	7"single	Polydor	2050 122
1974	Face To Face / No One Knows	7"single	Negram	NG 403
1974	Up And Down / She La La	7"single	Negram	NG 432
1974	Make Up Your Make-Up / Good Morning Everyone	7"single	Negram	NG 454
1975	The Hour Comes Nigh / Bumpy Sound	7"single	Negram	NG 488
1975	Who Am I / Angel Of The Night	7"single	Negram	NG 2068
1981	Osaka (Live) / Na Na Na (Live)	7"single	CNR	141 786
1995	In My Dreams + Donna	CDS	Multidisk	551 573 2

=== Singles chart ===
Single title	Release date	Charting in the Dutch Top 40			Comments
Single title	Release date	Date of entry	Highest	Weeks	Comments
Standing and staring		3-12-1966	13	12	
Na na na		18-2-1967	6	12	
Peace and privacy		20-5-1967	14	6	
Farewell in the rain		7-10-1967	14	8	
No money for roses		9-3-1968	14	9	
Man's life		25-5-1968	11	7	
Don't you cry for a girl		7-9-1968	5	9	
Emptiness		25-1-1969	34	3	
That tender looking angel		10-5-1969	26	4	
Happiness is in this beat		2-8-1969	19	5	
Daylight		29-11-1969	35	2	
Osaka		11-4-1970	6	10	
Adios corazon		18-7-1970	30	3	
Face to face		9-2-1974	12	7	
Make up your make up		9-11-1974	26	4	

== Awards and nominations ==
2016: Berlin Music Video Awards, nominated in the Best Performer category for 'SUBMARINE'
